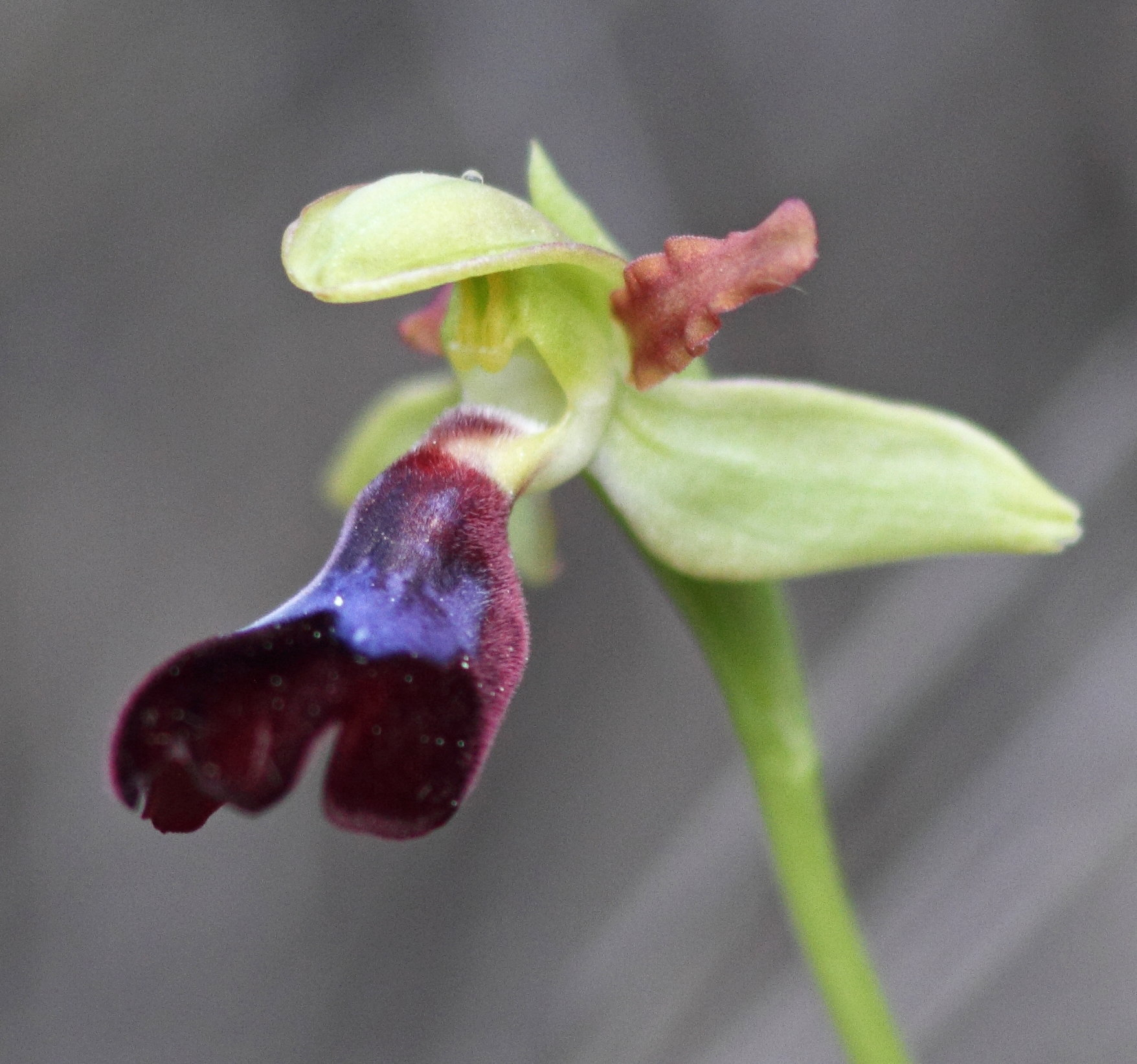
- In the Sierra Alpujata, Andalucía, Spain

Scientific classification
- Kingdom: Plantae
- Clade: Tracheophytes
- Clade: Angiosperms
- Clade: Monocots
- Order: Asparagales
- Family: Orchidaceae
- Subfamily: Orchidoideae
- Genus: Ophrys
- Species: O. atlantica

Binomial name
- Ophrys atlantica Munby

Synonyms
- Ophrys atlantica subsp. durieui (Rchb.f.) Maire & Weiller; Ophrys fusca subsp. atlantica (Munby) E.G.Camus; Ophrys fusca var. atlantica (Munby) Coss.; Ophrys fusca subsp. durieui (Rchb.f.) Soó; Ophrys fusca var. durieui Rchb.f.

= Ophrys atlantica =

Species of plant

Ophrys atlantica is a species of flowering plant in the family Orchidaceae, native to southern Spain and northwest Africa (Algeria, Morocco, and Tunisia). It was first described by Giles Munby in 1899. It has been treated as a subspecies of Ophrys fusca.

== Description ==
O. atlantica is a slender plant, usually growing to between 15 and 30 cm (6 and 12 in) tall, but occasionally up to 35 cm (14 in) tall. It has one to four flowers in a loose spike. The sepals are of a pale greenish colour. The central sepal is incurved, forming a hood over the column. The lateral petals are green or brown and have wavy edges. The lip or labellum of the flower is saddle-shaped with a narrow base. It is usually about 15–22 mm (0.6–0.9 in) long and 12–22 mm (0.5–0.9 in) across, three-lobed at the end. The labellum is purplish-black overall, paler at the base, with a distinct shiny blue speculum or mirror.

Although O. atlantica has been treated as a subspecies of O. fusca, it can be distinguished from that species by the wavy-edged lateral petals and the saddle-shaped lip with a narrowed base.

== Taxonomy ==
O. atlantica was first treated as a distinct taxon by Heinrich Gustav Reichenbach in 1851 who considered it to be the variety durieui of O. fusca. Károly Soó later treated this variety as a subspecies. It was first recognized as a distinct species under the name Ophrys atlantica by Giles Munby in 1899, although others later reduced it again to a variety or subspecies of O. fusca. As of September 2025, Plants of the World Online accepted it as a distinct species.

=== Names ===
Ophrys atlantica is known by the common names Atlantic bee ophrys, Atlas ophrys, and the Atlas orchid.

== Distribution and habitat ==
O. atlantica is mainly found in northwest Africa (Algeria, Morocco, and Tunisia). It occurs very locally on the Costa del Sol in southern Spain. Typical habitats include open woodland, garrigue and scrubby grassland, where the soil is basic. It occurs from sea level up to altitudes of 1,500 m (4,900 ft).

== Ecology ==
O. atlantica is pollinated by the megachilid bee Megachile parietina (syn. Chalicodoma parietina). It shares this pollinator with O. bertolonii; both species have a saddle-shaped lip or labellum, which likely represents an adaptation.
