= Ophrys × campolati =

Scientific classification
- Kingdom: Plantae
- Clade: Tracheophytes
- Clade: Angiosperms
- Clade: Monocots
- Order: Asparagales
- Family: Orchidaceae
- Subfamily: Orchidoideae
- Genus: Ophrys
- Species: O. × campolati

Binomial name
- Ophrys × campolati O.Danesch & E.Danesch

Synonyms
- Ophrys × daneschiorum P.Delforge; Ophrys × gaulosana Mifsud; Ophrys × venusiana H.Baumann & Künkele

Species of plant

Ophrys × campolati, syn. Ophrys × gaulosana, is a hybrid species of plant in the family Orchidaceae (orchids). It is considered to be a hybrid among Ophrys bertolonii, Ophrys sphegodes and Ophrys tenthredinifera.
