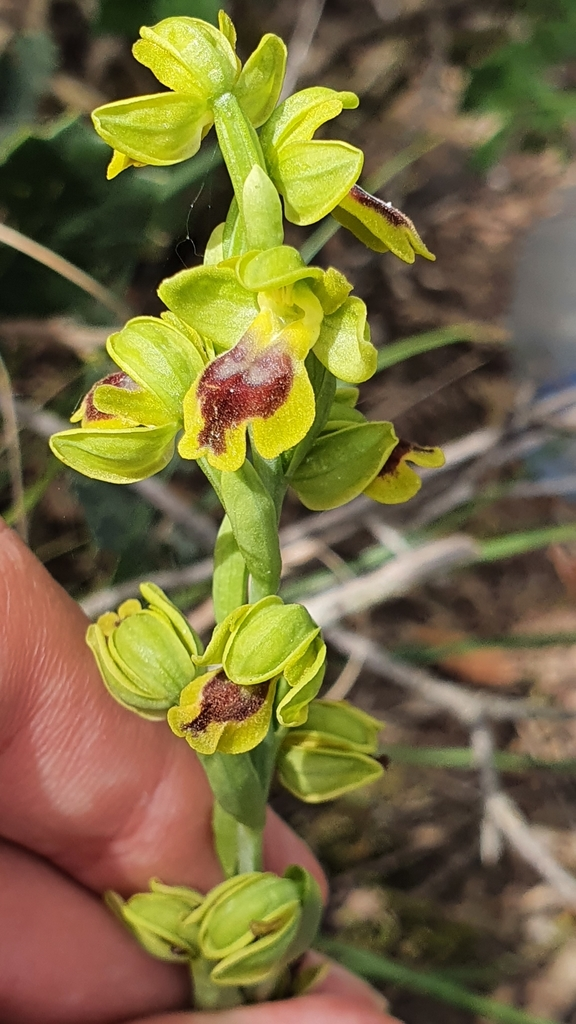
- In Algeria

Scientific classification
- Kingdom: Plantae
- Clade: Tracheophytes
- Clade: Angiosperms
- Clade: Monocots
- Order: Asparagales
- Family: Orchidaceae
- Subfamily: Orchidoideae
- Genus: Ophrys
- Species: O. battandieri

Binomial name
- Ophrys battandieri E.G.Camus

Synonyms
- List: Ophrys algeriensis Kreutz & L.Lewis; Ophrys barauensis J.-M.Lewin; Ophrys carpitana M.R.Lowe, Gügel & Kreutz; Ophrys fraresiana M.R.Lowe, Piera & M.B.Crespo; Ophrys galilaea subsp. murbeckii (H.Fleischm.) Del Prete; Ophrys gauthieri Gauth.-Lièvre; Ophrys gauthieri subsp. lucronii (Benito) F.M.Vázquez; Ophrys grottaparrinoi Soca; Ophrys hernandesii Gonz.-Muñoz & F.M.Vázquez; Ophrys lucronii Benito; Ophrys lutea subsp. battandieri (E.G.Camus) Kreutz; Ophrys lutea subsp. funerea Batt.; Ophrys lutea subsp. murbeckii (H.Fleischm.) Soó; Ophrys lutea subsp. numida (Devillers-Tersch. & Devillers) Kreutz; Ophrys minaventoi Soca; Ophrys murbeckii H.Fleischm.; Ophrys numida Devillers-Tersch. & Devillers; Ophrys serrae Benito; Ophrys subfusca f. leucadica G.Keller & Soó; Ophrys subfusca f. punctulata G.Keller & Soó; Ophrys subfusca subsp. battandieri (E.G.Camus) Kreutz; Ophrys subfusca subsp. numida (Devillers-Tersch. & Devillers) Kreutz

= Ophrys battandieri =

Species of plant

Ophrys battandieri is a species of flowering plant in the family Orchidaceae, native to Spain and northwest Africa (Algeria, Morocco, and Tunisia), and possibly elsewhere. Ophrys murbeckii may be treated as a synonym.

== Description ==
Ophrys battandieri is a slender plant growing from 20 to 40 cm (8 to 16 in) tall. The lower leaves are arranged in a basal rosette, while the upper leaves are erect. The lax inflorescence has four to ten flowers. Plants observed at Tikjda in Algeria had three to seven flowers. Flowers have olive-green to yellowish-green sepals. The two lateral sepals are bent forward, while the dorsal sepal is bent over forming a hood. The two pale yellow to yellowish-green lateral petals are relatively large (about a third to half as long as the lateral sepals) and have wavy margins. The labellum or lip is 8–12.5 mm (0.3–0.5 in) long and 7–12.5 mm (0.3–0.5 in), possibly up to 13–14 mm (0.5–0.6 in) long. The background colour of the labellum is dark or reddish brown with a broad yellow margin up to 3 mm (0.12 in) wide and a straight and narrow, lighter base. The apex of the lip is three-lobed, the lateral lobes being shorter than the middle lobe. The speculum or mirror has an irregular shape. Its centre is shiny, ranging in colour from greyish-blue through blue to light purple. The outer edges of the speculum are usually separated from the yellow margin by a reddish-brown outline.

== Taxonomy ==
Ophrys battandieri was first described by Edmond Gustave Camus in 1908. The specific epithet battandieri honours the French botanist Jules Aimé Battandier (1848-1922), who made a major contribution to the study of the flora of Algeria.

Morphologically, the species resembles others placed in the Ophrys lutea group. It has been synonymized with or treated as a subspecies of O. subfusca (which is itself now accepted as a subspecies of O. fusca). It has also been confused with hybrids between O. fusca and O. lutea. In 2010, it was resurrected as a separate species in a synonymic index of the flora of North Africa.

As of October 2025, although some sources, including Plants of the World Online, regard Ophrys murbeckii as an independent species, others, including World Flora Online, treat O. murbeckii as a synonym of O. battandieri.

== Distribution and habitat ==
The precise distribution of Ophrys battandieri depends on which other taxa are synonymized with it. Its primary distribution is northwest Africa (Algeria, Morocco, and Tunisia) and southern Spain. Some sources also consider it native to France, Crete and Sicily, or restrict its distribution to northwest Africa. In northwest Africa, it is found in a variety of habitats, including nutrient-poor meadows, dry grassland, open garrigue, open woodland and wasteland at elevations from sea level to 900 m (3,000 ft). It favours calcareous or sandy soils.

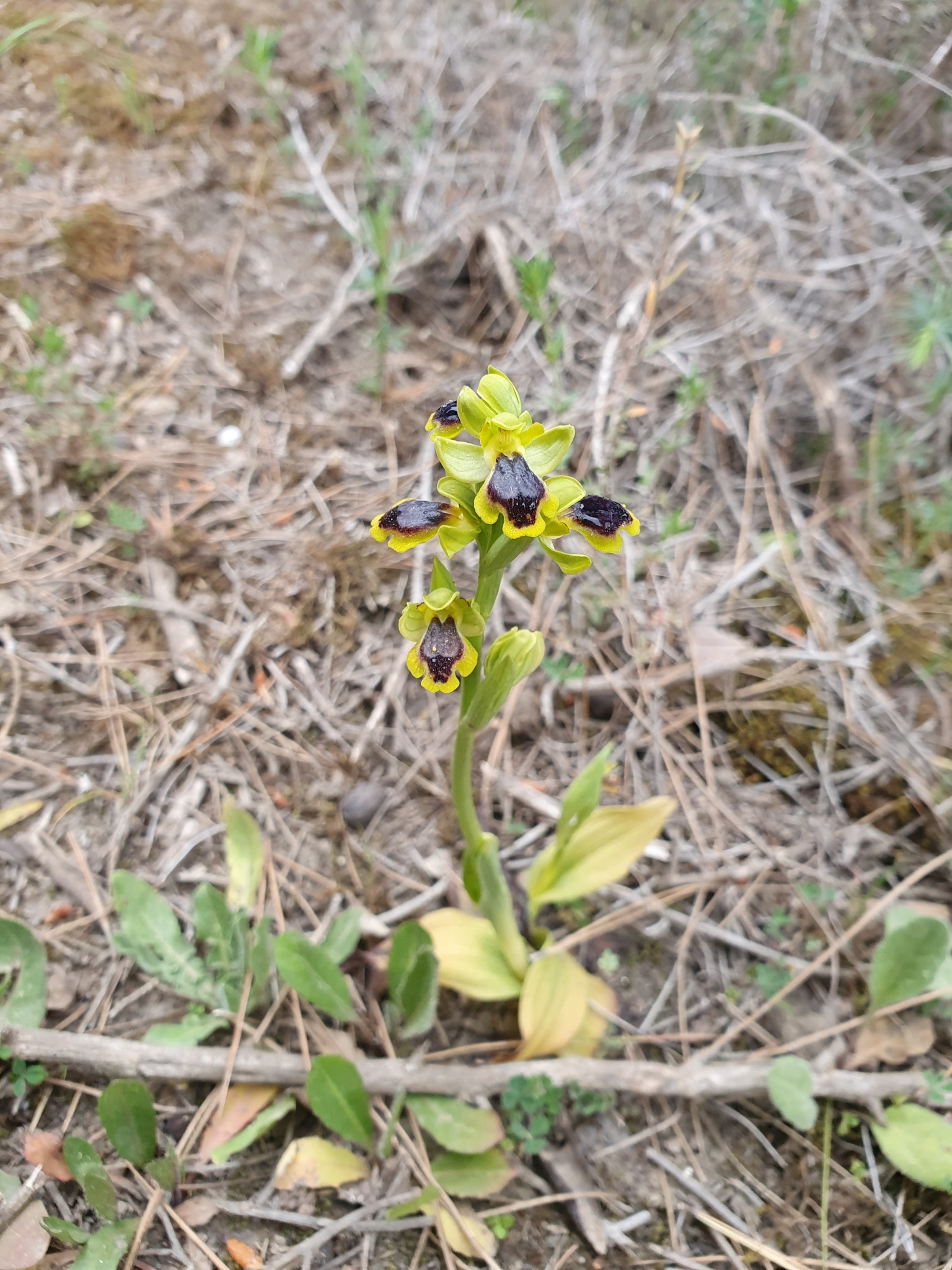
Plant in Algeria initially identified as O. murbeckii
