= Mandy and Lara Sirdah =

Palestinian photographers and birdwatchers

Mandy Sirdah and Lara Sirdah
- ماندي سرداح, لارا سرداح
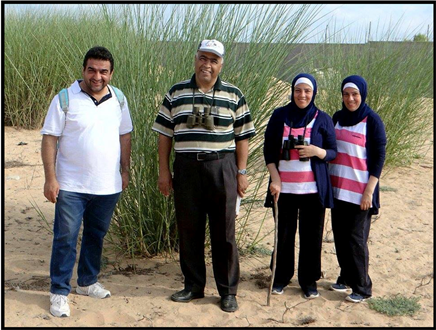
- An ecological tour for birdwatching and documentation in the coastal Al-Mawasi ecosystem in the southern Gaza Strip in 2017
- Born: April 24, 1976 (age 49); Gaza City
- Known for: wildlife photography, birdwatching

Mandy Sirdah (Arabic: ماندي سرداح) and Lara Sirdah (Arabic: لارا سرداح) (born April 24, 1976) are Palestinian twin sisters known for their work in wildlife photography and birdwatching in the Gaza Strip. They aim to document the wildlife and raise awareness of the biodiversity in Gaza.

== Early life ==
Mandy and Lara Sirdah are identical twins, were born in Gaza City in 1976, and have spent most of their lives in the Gaza Strip. They share a deep passion for nature and wildlife which began when they were children, although they did not receive formal education in biology or photography.

== Wildlife exploration ==
Their wildlife exploration began when they observed a Spanish sparrow in their own backyard in 2005. Capturing it with an old phone ignited their interest in documenting the flora and fauna of Gaza.

In 2008, the Sirdahs acquired a digital camera and decided to spend more time documenting Gaza's wildlife. They subsequently purchased a Nikon camera and established social media accounts in 2012. As a result, they became the first wildlife photographers in Gaza.

The primary goal of the Sirdahs is to showcase the beauty of Gaza's natural environment and wildlife. They seek to challenge the common perception of Gaza as a place of conflict and destruction by highlighting its stunning wildlife. Through their work, they have been able to document a variety of rare bird and plant species, including the pied avocet, Eurasian oystercatcher, European nightjar, Ophrys umbilicata, Hyoscyamus aureus, and Calotropis procera.

Their extensive archive of Gaza's wildlife has become a valuable resource for academics, researchers, and archivists. Palestinian universities have integrated their work into educational and research programs. The University of Palestine published the first guide to medical plants in Gaza in 2018, including 25 photos by the Sirdahs.

In 2018, the Sirdahs held their first exhibition on Gaza's wildlife at the A.M. Qattan Foundation. The event attracted numerous environmental experts and enthusiasts, further increasing awareness of Gaza's biodiversity.

In March 2023, 18 researchers and birdwatchers, including the Sirdahs, published the first bird list of the Gaza Strip, which included 250 bird species, representing 45.4% of the 551 species of birds living in Palestine.

The Sirdahs have faced many challenges, including the Israeli blockade, which limits their access to various areas with untapped wildlife. They have also had difficulties importing telescopes and telephoto cameras, which are suspected to have military uses by the Israeli authorities. It is also very dangerous for them to carry binoculars and cameras in border areas. Many of their explorations are self-funded due to the lack of support from institutions or organizations.

== Awards ==
The Sirdahs were awarded the title of "Most Important Photographers in Palestine" in 2019 by the Ramallah-based organization Lady of the Earth Foundation. However, they were unable to receive the award as a result of Israeli restrictions.

== Future plans ==
Mandy and Lara Sirdah remain committed to their mission of documenting and conserving Gaza's wildlife. They plan to compile the most extensive encyclopedia of Gaza's wildlife to date, which they aim to release in the coming years.
