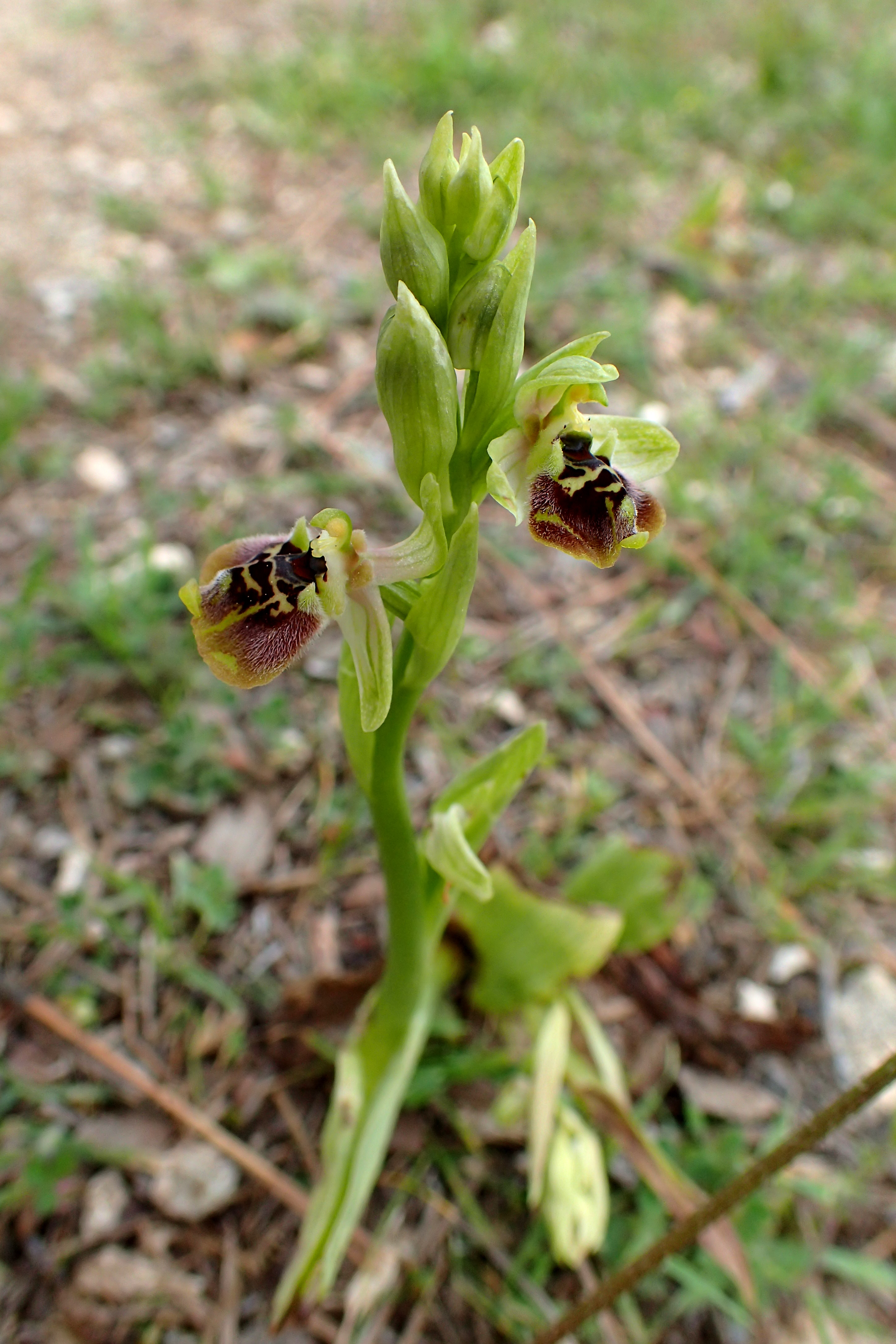
- Ophrys bornmuelleri subsp. bornmuelleri in Cyprus

Scientific classification
- Kingdom: Plantae
- Clade: Tracheophytes
- Clade: Angiosperms
- Clade: Monocots
- Order: Asparagales
- Family: Orchidaceae
- Subfamily: Orchidoideae
- Genus: Ophrys
- Species: O. bornmuelleri

Binomial name
- Ophrys bornmuelleri M.Schulze

Synonyms
- Ophrys fuciflora subsp. bornmuelleri (M.Schulze) B.Willing & E.Willing

= Ophrys bornmuelleri =

Species of plant

Ophrys bornmuelleri is a species of flowering plant in the family Orchidaceae, native to the eastern Mediterranean (Crete, Cyprus, the East Aegean islands, mainland Greece, Lebanon-Syria, the Palestine region, and Turkey) and northern Iraq. It was first described by Maximilian Schultze in 1899.

== Subspecies ==
As of October 2025, Plants of the World Online accepted five subspecies:

- Ophrys bornmuelleri subsp. bornmuelleri – eastern Mediterranean to northern Iraq
- Ophrys bornmuelleri subsp. carduchorum Renz & Taubenheim – southeast Turkey
- Ophrys bornmuelleri subsp. grandiflora (H.Fleischm. & Soó) Renz & Taubenheim – central and southern Turkey, Cyprus
- Ophrys bornmuelleri subsp. pallidiconi (Faurh.) Deniz – south-southwest Turkey
- Ophrys bornmuelleri subsp. ziyaretiana (Kreutz & Ruedi Peter) Kreutz – Turkey, Lebanon-Syria, the Palestine region
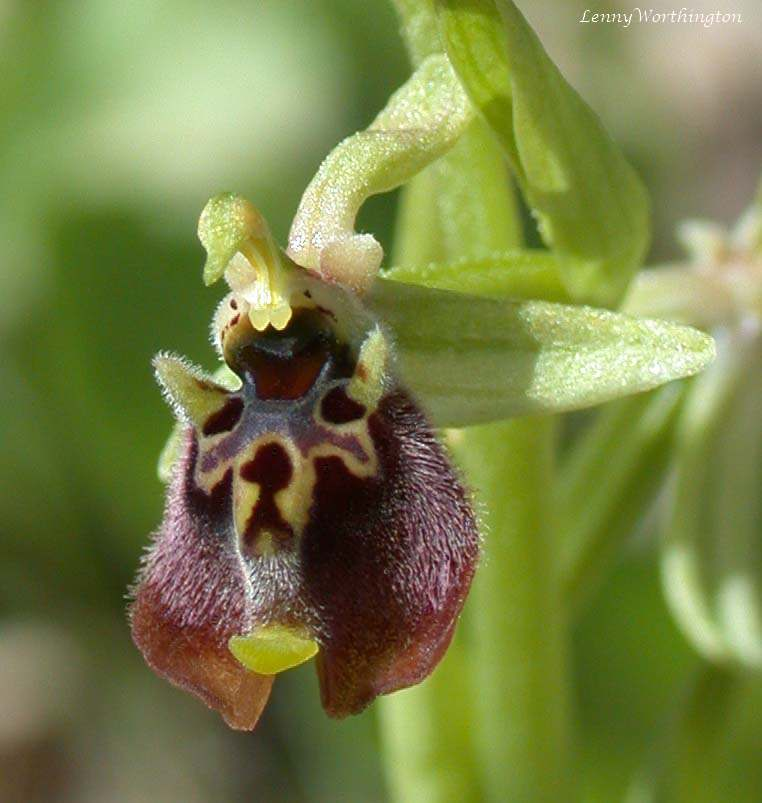
Flower (initially identified as O. aphrodite, synonym of O. bornmuelleri subsp. bornmuelleri)
