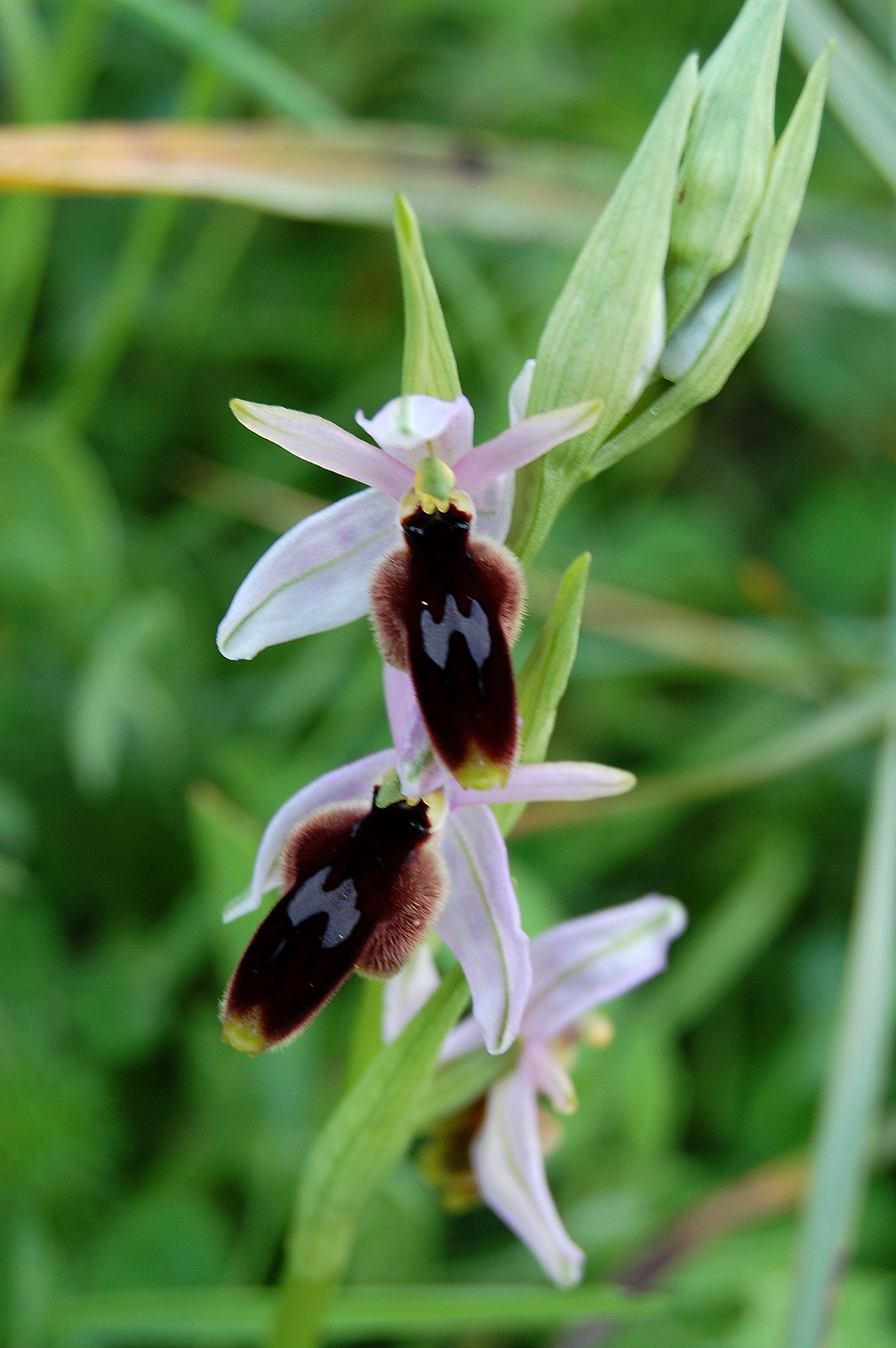
- Moon orchid flower
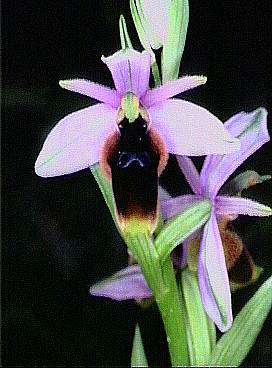

Scientific classification
- Kingdom: Plantae
- Clade: Tracheophytes
- Clade: Angiosperms
- Clade: Monocots
- Order: Asparagales
- Family: Orchidaceae
- Subfamily: Orchidoideae
- Genus: Ophrys
- Species: O. lunulata

Binomial name
- Ophrys lunulata Parl.

Synonyms
- Arachnites lunulata (Parl.) Tod.; Ophrys sphegodes ssp. lunulata (Parl.) H.Sund.; Ophrys aranifera var. lunulata (Parl.) Rchb.f. in H.G.L.Reichenbach; Ophrys aranifera subsp. lunulata (Parl.) E.G.Camus in E.G.Camus, P.Bergon & A.A.Camus

= Ophrys lunulata =

Moon orchid

Species of orchid

Ophrys lunulata, the moon orchid, is a species of orchid native to the islands of Malta and Sicily in the central Mediterranean.

In 1992 Ophrys lunulata was designated as a 'priority species' under Annex II of the Habitats Directive of the European Community (which was reformed as the European Union the following year). This designation was meant to serve as the basis for Italy to declare which areas in which it occurs are 'Special Areas of Conservation' -which were to form the backbone of the Natura 2000 network, but only if these areas include one of the number of habitats listed in Annex I of the directive.
