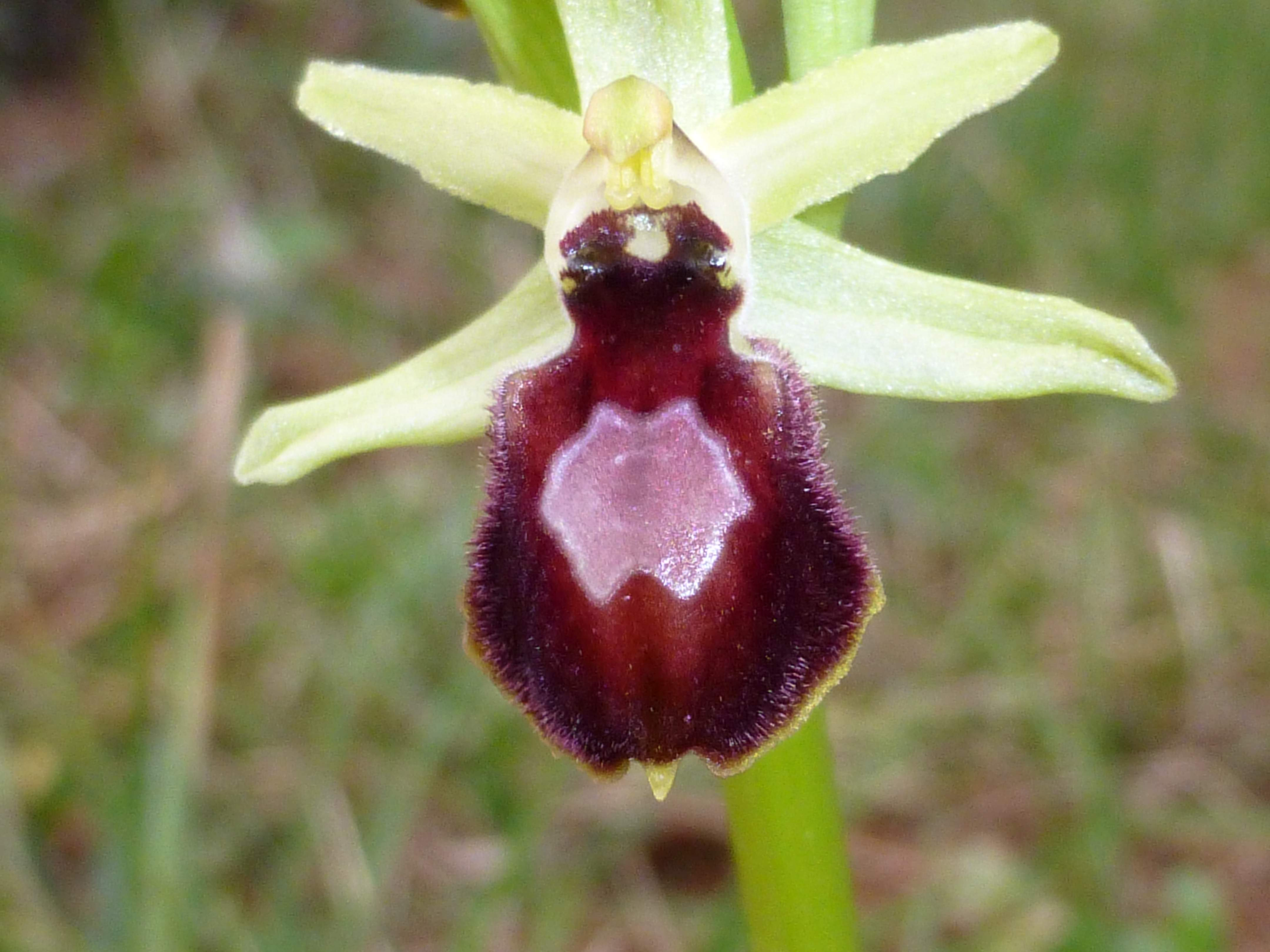

Scientific classification
- Kingdom: Plantae
- Clade: Tracheophytes
- Clade: Angiosperms
- Clade: Monocots
- Order: Asparagales
- Family: Orchidaceae
- Subfamily: Orchidoideae
- Genus: Ophrys
- Species: O. × arachnitiformis

Binomial name
- Ophrys × arachnitiformis Gren. & Philippe

Synonyms
- Ophrys × obscura Beck; Ophrys × aschersonii Nanteuil; Ophrys × specularia (Rchb.f.) Lojac.; Ophrys × chatenieri Rouy in G.Rouy & J.Foucaud; Ophrys × godferyana A.Camus; Ophrys × augustae A.Fuchs; Ophrys × licana A.Fuchs; Ophrys × morisii (Martelli) G.Keller & Soó; Ophrys × monachorum O.Danesch & E.Danesch; Ophrys × montis-leonis O.Danesch & E.Danesch; Ophrys × sipontensis O.Danesch & E.Danesch; Ophrys × splendida Gölz & H.R.Reinhard; Ophrys × tyrrhena Gölz & H.R.Reinhard; Ophrys × archipelagi Gölz & H.R.Reinhard; Ophrys × castellana Devillers-Tersch. & Devillers; Ophrys × dionysii P.Delforge; Ophrys × fayencensis (P.Delforge) P.Delforge; Ophrys × integra (Moggr. & Rchb.f.) Paulus & Gack; Ophrys × mateolana Medagli & al.; Ophrys × panattensis Scrugli, Cogoni & Pessei; Ophrys × crocii Soca; Ophrys × pesseiae P.Delforge; Ophrys × trombettensis Soca; Ophrys × massiliensis Viglione & Véla; Ophrys × gallica Looken; Ophrys × glanensis Soca; Ophrys × debruijckereana Looken; Ophrys × occidentalis (Scappat.) Scappat. & M.Demange; Ophrys × carduccii Romolini & Soca

= Ophrys × arachnitiformis =

False spider orchid

Species of plant

Ophrys × arachnitiformis, the false spider orchid, is an orchid native to Europe. It is apparently a hybrid resulting from a cross between O. holosericea × O. sphegodes, but has become established in the wild in Britain, France (including Corsica), Germany, parts of Italy (Liguria, Tuscany, Lazio, Apulia, Sicily, Sardinia), Austria, Switzerland, Hungary, and the former Yugoslavia.

Ophrys like other orchids are dependent on symbiotic fungi at some point during their life cycle, but especially for germination, which may take months or even years underground. Orchid roots contain Orchid mycorrhiza, coils of fungal hyphae inside orchid root cells.
