= Ophrys cilicica =

Scientific classification
- Kingdom: Plantae
- Clade: Tracheophytes
- Clade: Angiosperms
- Clade: Monocots
- Order: Asparagales
- Family: Orchidaceae
- Subfamily: Orchidoideae
- Genus: Ophrys
- Species: O. cilicica

Binomial name
- Ophrys cilicica Schltr.

Synonyms
- List: Ophrys kurdica D.Rückbr. & U.Rückbr.; Ophrys kurdica subsp. kurdistanica (Renz) Soó; Ophrys kurdistanica Renz

Western Asian orchid species

Ophrys cilicica is a species of flowering plant in the Orchid family, native to Western Asia. It was first described by Rudolf Schlechter in 1923.

== Description ==
Cilician ophrys has two round tubers that can grow 15 to 60 centimeters in height, but usually no taller than 30 cm. At the base of the plant it will have two to five leaves that are narrowly lanceolate, shaped somewhat like the head of the spear with the widest part below the midpoint. They can reach as much as 13 cm in length and 2 cm in width.

The inflorescence will have three to twelve widely spaced flowers. The flowers somewhat resembles a wasp and is suspected of being pollinated by species in the genus Argogorytes. The flowers have egg shaped to lanceolate sepals that measure 9 to 12 millimeters and are pale green sometimes somewhat pink or red. The petals extending out to the sides are pale green-pink and narrowly lanceolate measuring 4.5 to 6 mm. The lower lip petal is predominately red to dark brown, occasionally violet-brown, but with a pale edge. It is velvet like in texture and measures 10 to 12 mm long. It also has two small side lobes.

== Taxonomy ==
Ophrys cilicica was scientifically described and named by Rudolf Schlechter in 1923. It is classified in the genus Ophrys as part of the family Orchidaceae. It has no accepted subspecies, but it has three heterotypic synonyms including a subspecies.

Table of Synonyms
Name	Year	Rank
Ophrys kurdica D.Rückbr. & U.Rückbr.	1975	species
Ophrys kurdica subsp. kurdistanica (Renz) Soó	1979	subspecies
Ophrys kurdistanica Renz	1978	species

=== Names ===
The species name, cilicica, means "of Cilicia" a region in southern Anatolia. Ophrys cilicica is known by the common names Cilician ophrys or Cilician orchid.

== Range and habitat ==
It is native to four countries in southwest Asia, Turkey, Syria, Iraq, and Iran. In Turkey it grows in isolated areas of the south and southeast. In Iraq it grows in Kurdistan and it grows in the northwest of Syria. It can be found at elevations of 500 to 1400 meters.

It tends to be found on calcareous soils in dry to mesic habitats. It may be found in nutrient poor meadows, open deciduous forests, and in scrublands. It grows in full sun to semi-shady locations.
