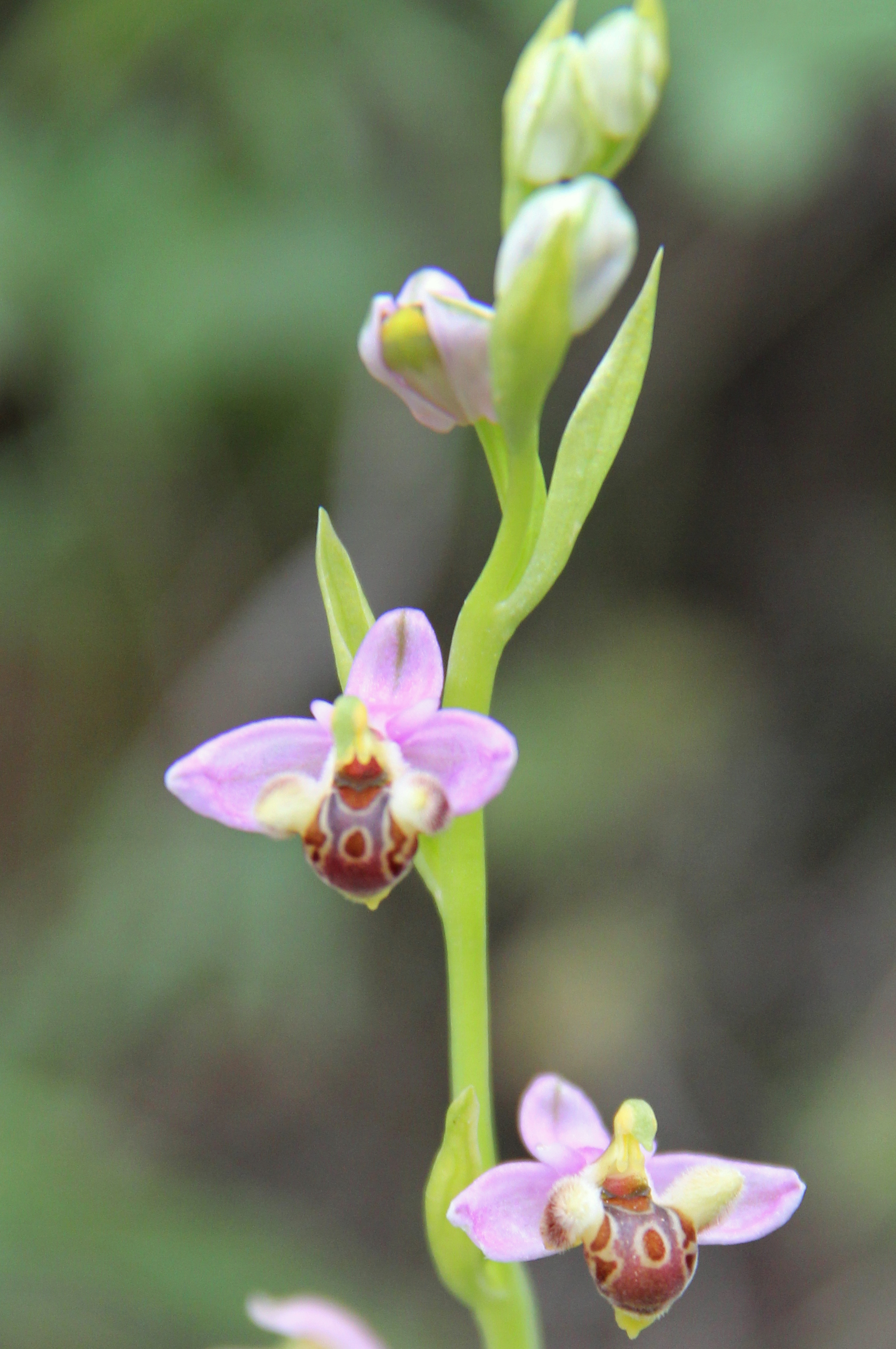
- In Turkey

Scientific classification
- Kingdom: Plantae
- Clade: Tracheophytes
- Clade: Angiosperms
- Clade: Monocots
- Order: Asparagales
- Family: Orchidaceae
- Subfamily: Orchidoideae
- Genus: Ophrys
- Species: O. schulzei

Binomial name
- Ophrys schulzei Bornm. & Fleischm.

Synonyms
- Ophrys luristanica Renz; Ophrys schulzei subsp. kurdica H.Fleischm.

= Ophrys schulzei =

Species of plant

Ophrys schulzei is a species of flowering plant in the family Orchidaceae, native to Western Asia (Iran, Iraq, Lebanon-Syria, and Turkey). It was first described in 1911.
