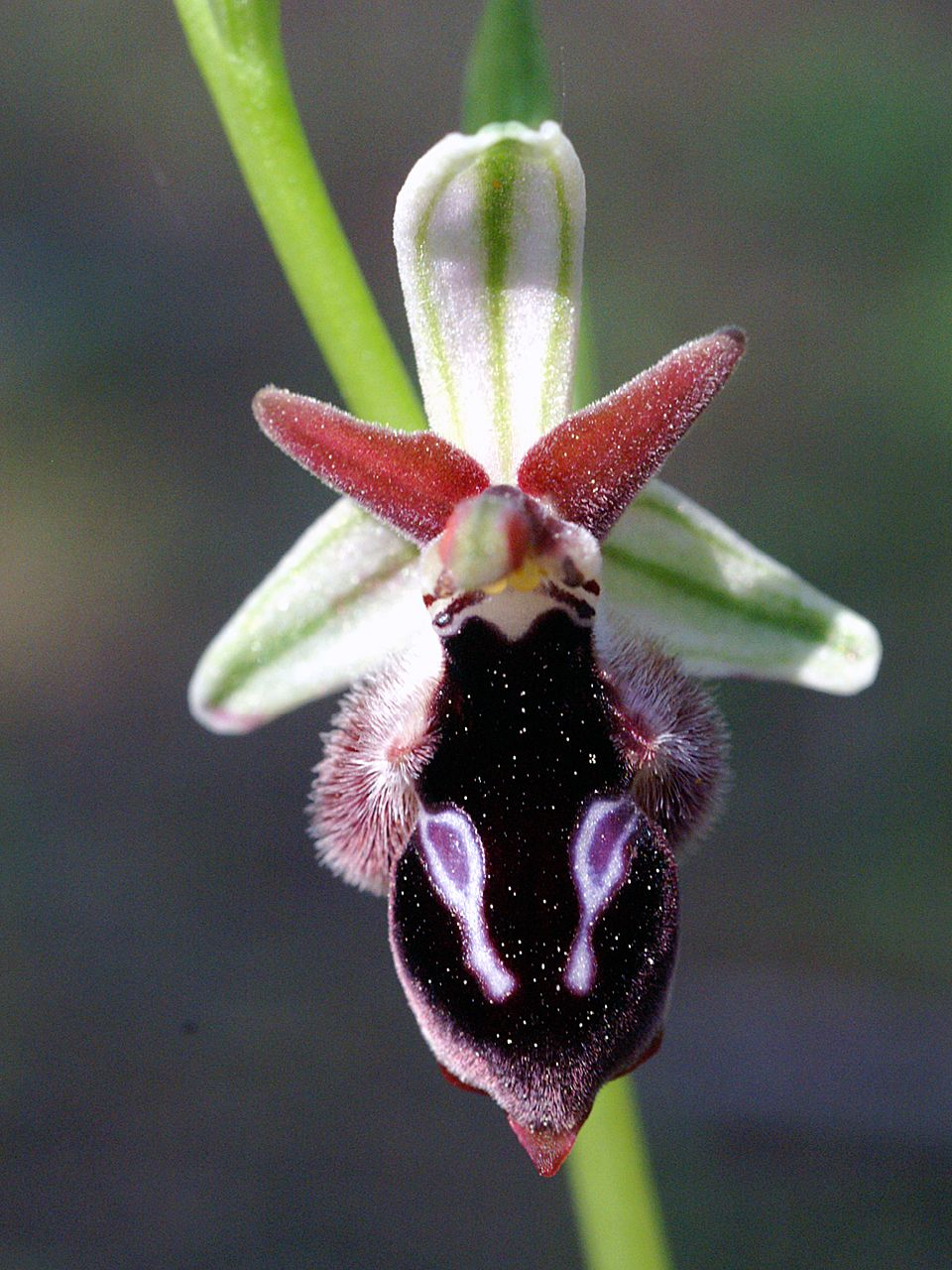
- Flower of Ophrys reinholdii

Scientific classification
- Kingdom: Plantae
- Clade: Tracheophytes
- Clade: Angiosperms
- Clade: Monocots
- Order: Asparagales
- Family: Orchidaceae
- Subfamily: Orchidoideae
- Genus: Ophrys
- Species: O. reinholdii

Binomial name
- Ophrys reinholdii Spruner ex Fleischm.

Synonyms
- Ophrys spruneri var. reinholdii (Spruner ex Fleischm.) Nyman; Ophrys reinholdii f. albovirescens B.Willing & E.Willing; Ophrys reinhardiorum Paulus

= Ophrys reinholdii =

Species of orchid

Ophrys reinholdii is a species of orchid. Its native range from Croatia in southeastern Europe to northwestern Iran in western Asia, including Bulgaria, Greece, Turkey and Cyprus.

== Subspecies ==
Two subspecies are currently recognized (May 2022):

  - Ophrys reinholdii subsp. straussii (H.Fleischm. & Bornm.) E.Nelson - Turkey, Syria
  - Ophrys reinholdii subsp. reinholdii - from Croatia to Turkey
