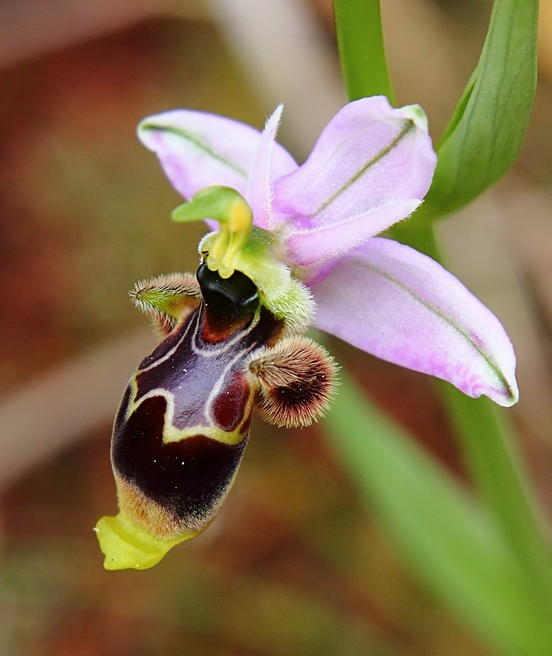

Conservation status
- Least Concern (IUCN 3.1)

Scientific classification
- Kingdom: Plantae
- Clade: Tracheophytes
- Clade: Angiosperms
- Clade: Monocots
- Order: Asparagales
- Family: Orchidaceae
- Subfamily: Orchidoideae
- Genus: Ophrys
- Species: O. scolopax

Binomial name
- Ophrys scolopax Cav.

Synonyms
- Ophrys arachnites var. scolopax (Cav.) Fiori & Paol. in A.Fiori; Ophrys holoserica subsp. scolopax (Cav.) H.Sund.; Ophrys fuciflora subsp. scolopax (Cav.) H.Sund.; Oprhys hippocratis P.Delforge; Ophrys oestrifera subsp. stavri Kalog.

= Ophrys scolopax =

Species of orchid

Ophrys scolopax, known as the woodcock bee-orchid or woodcock orchid, is a species of terrestrial orchid found around the Mediterranean and the Middle East, from Morocco and Portugal to Hungary and Iran.

== Description ==
Ophrys scolopax grows from underground tubers. Leaves typically start to appear above ground in late autumn and are often beginning to yellow by the time the flowers appear, which in the case of O. scolopax is between March and June in their native habitats. The flower spike is very variable in height, usually 10–50 cm (4–20 in) tall, but occasionally up to 90 cm (3 ft). The number of flowers is equally variable, with as few as two or as many as 15 or even more. Each flower has the standard structure for the genus. There are three outer sepals which may be lighter or darker shades of green or violet, the lightest appearing white. Each is 7–16 mm (0.3–0.6 in) long by 3–10 mm (0.1–0.4 in) wide. The upper (dorsal) sepal varies from flat to boat-shaped and is bent backwards at the base and then curves forwards. Inside the sepals are three petals, two lateral petals and the lip. The lateral petals may be pink to violet in colour, or green, and are around 1.5–8 mm (0.1–0.3 in) long by 0.8–4 mm (0.0–0.2 in) wide.

The lip (labellum) has a complex three-dimensional shape and is strongly patterned. It is divided at the base into three lobes, each of which is rolled up so that from the front there appear to be three tubes. The relative length of the three lobes varies; the larger central lobe is 6–16 mm (0.2–0.6 in) long and has a more or less upturned appendage. The outer sides of the side lobes are hairy; the margins of the central lobe are velvety. The rest of the surface of the lobes is smooth. The background colour of the lip is some shade of brown. The speculum is H- or X-shaped or even more complicated, usually a dull blue to violet in colour with a pale yellow border.

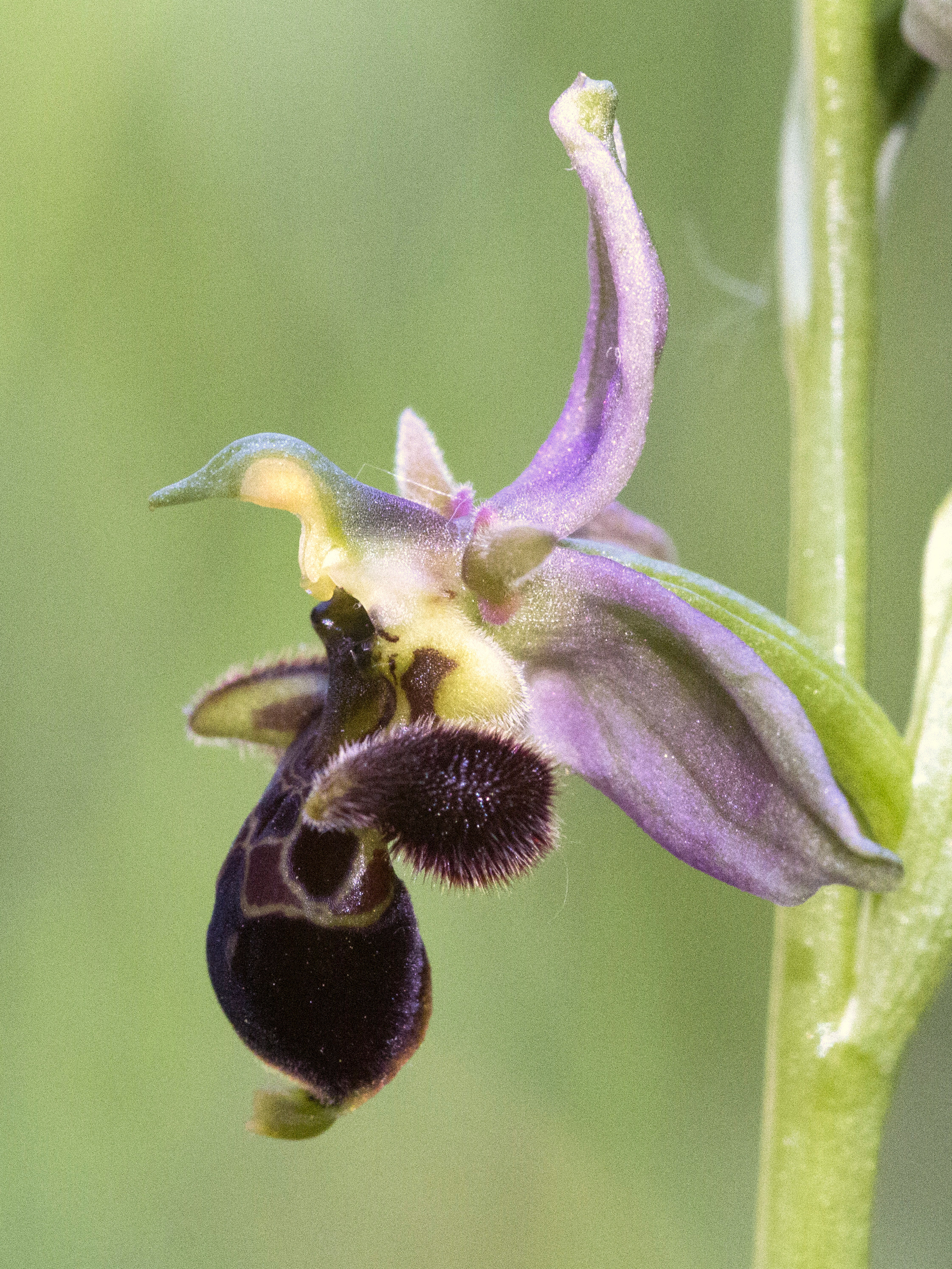
Ophrys scolopax - MHNT

== Subspecies ==
A rather long list of varieties, forms, and subspecies have been proposed for this species. As of May 2014, the following such names are recognized:

- Ophrys scolopax subsp. apiformis (Desf.) Maire & Weiller – Spain, Portugal, Sardinia, Sicily, Tunisia, Algeria, and Morocco
- Ophrys scolopax subsp. conradiae (Melki & Deschâtres) H.Baumann & al. – Corsica, Sardinia, and Italy
- Ophrys scolopax subsp. cornuta (Steven) E.G.Camus – Hungary, Apulia, the Balkans, Crimea, Turkey, and the Caucasus
- Ophrys scolopax subsp. heldreichii (Schltr.) E.Nelson – Greece, Turkey, and Apulia
- Ophrys scolopax var. minutula (Gölz & H.R.Reinhard) H.A.Pedersen & Faurh – Turkey, Greek islands
- Ophrys scolopax subsp. rhodia (H.Baumann & Künkele) H.A.Pedersen & Faurh. – Greek islands
- Ophrys scolopax subsp. scolopax – from Portugal to Iran

== Bibliography ==
- Pedersen, Henrik Ærenlund & Faurholdt, Niels (2007), Ophrys: The Bee Orchids of Europe, Kew Botanical Magazine Monograph, Richmond, Surrey, UK: Kew Publishing, ISBN 978-1-84246-152-5
