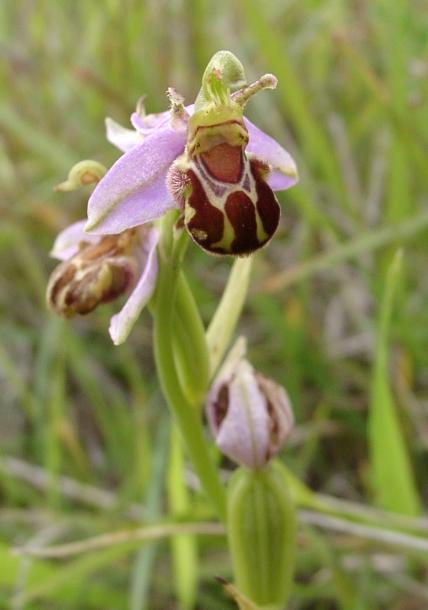
- Bee orchid (Ophrys apifera var. aurita)

Scientific classification
- Kingdom: Plantae
- Clade: Tracheophytes
- Clade: Angiosperms
- Clade: Monocots
- Order: Asparagales
- Family: Orchidaceae
- Subfamily: Orchidoideae
- Tribe: Orchideae
- Subtribe: Orchidinae
- Genus: Ophrys; L., 1753

Type species
- Ophrys insectifera L., 1753

Synonyms
- Arachnites F.W.Schmidt; Myodium Salisb.

= Ophrys =

Genus of orchids

The genus Ophrys is a large group of orchids from the alliance Orchis in the subtribe Orchidinae. They are widespread across much of Europe, North Africa, Caucasus, the Canary Islands, and the Middle East as far east as Turkmenistan.

These plants are remarkable in that they successfully reproduce through pseudocopulation, that is, their flowers mimic female insects to such a degree that amorous males are fooled into mating with the flowers, thereby pollinating them. There are many natural hybrids.

They are referred to as the "bee orchids" due to the flowers of some species resemblance to the furry bodies of bees and other insects. Their scientific name Ophrys is the Greek word for "eyebrow", referring to the furry edges of the lips of several species.

Ophrys was first mentioned in the book "Natural History" by Pliny the Elder (23-79 AD).

== Biology ==
They are terrestrial or ground orchids found from central to South Europe, North Africa, Asia Minor, up to the Caucasus Mountains, but mostly in the Mediterranean region. They have been said to be the most important group of European terrestrial orchids.

During summer, all Ophrys orchids are dormant as underground bulbous tubers, which serve as a food reserve. In late summer/autumn they develop a rosette of leaves. Also a new tuber starts to grow and matures until the following spring; the old tuber slowly dies. The next spring the flowering stem starts to grow. During the flowering period the leaves have already started to wither.

Ophrys species, like other orchids, are dependent on symbiotic fungi at some point during their life cycle, but especially for germination, which may take months or even years underground. Orchid roots contain Orchid mycorrhiza, coils of fungal hyphae inside orchid root cells.

Transplanting specimens, especially wild specimens, is difficult, sometimes impossible, due to this symbiosis unless a large amount of surrounding earth is also taken with the plant. All orchids are protected under CITES II and should not be removed or disturbed in habitat.

The shiny, basal leaves have a green or bluish colour. Two to twelve flowers grow on an erect stem with basal leaves. These species are successfully cultivated by specialist growers of terrestrial orchids and are reported to be difficult to grow, being sensitive to rotting and damping off diseases if not properly subjected to a cool and dry aestivation period over the summer months with little water.

=== Pollination ===
Orchids of the genus Ophrys use sexual deception to attract pollinators to their flowers. In sexual deception, an orchid attracts male pollinators by producing the sex pheromone of virgin female pollinators in addition to providing visual and tactile cues. These signals stimulate mating behaviour in the male pollinators, which then attempt copulation, called "pseudocopulation", with the orchid labellum. During pseudocopulation, pollen from the flower's column becomes attached to some part of the pollinator, usually the head or abdomen, and the pollinator inadvertently carries and transfers this pollen to other flowers when it is once again enticed into pseudocopulation. While the morphological cues such as the shape and texture of the labellum play a role especially at close range in inducing the pollinator mating behavior, the orchid's pheromone mimic, or allomone, has been shown to play the most important role in enticing pollinators to the flower.

The allomone produced by an orchid is specific to its pollinator, of which it usually only has one. The allomone is a mixture of alkenes and alkanes. There are one or more active species in this mixture that account for the attraction of pollinators. Pollinators and orchids use the same chemical compounds in the same absolute amounts in their pheromones and allomones, respectively.

Every Ophrys orchid has its own pollinator insect and is completely dependent on this species for its survival. Duped males are less likely to return and may ignore other plants of the same species. Only about 10% of an Ophrys population gets pollinated. This is enough to preserve the population, since each Ophrys orchid produces about 12,000 minute seeds.

== Species ==
The number of species recognised varies very widely between authorities. Flora Europaea in 1980 and Pedersen & Faurholdt in 2007 listed about 20 species in Europe as a whole; Buttler in 1991 increased this to 53 for slightly larger geographical area; Delforge in 1995 gave a total of 130 species. By contrast, a molecular phylogenetic study in 2008 suggested that there were around 10 distinguishable groups.

The need for further study is indicated. As of September 2025, Plants of the World Online accepted 25 species and a much larger number of hybrids:

- Ophrys apifera Huds. – bee-orchid
- Ophrys argolica H.Fleischm. – Argolian bee-orchid
- Ophrys atlantica Munby – Atlantic bee-orchid
- Ophrys battandieri E.G.Camus
- Ophrys bertolonii Moretti – Bertoloni's bee-orchid
- Ophrys bombyliflora Link – bumblebee orchid
- Ophrys bornmuelleri M.Schulze
- Ophrys cilicica Schltr. – Cilician bee-orchid
- Ophrys cretica (Vierh.) E.Nelson – Cretan bee-orchid
- Ophrys ferrum-equinum Desf. – horseshoe bee-orchid
- Ophrys fusca Link – sombre bee-orchid
- Ophrys holosericea (Burm.f.) Greuter, syn. Ophrys fuciflora (F.W.Schmidt) Moench – late spider-orchid
- Ophrys insectifera L. – fly orchid
- Ophrys kotschyi H.Fleischm. & Soó – Cyprus bee-orchid, Kotschy's bee-orchid
- Ophrys lunulata Parl.
- Ophrys lutea Cav. – yellow bee-orchid
- Ophrys murbeckii H.Fleischm. – treated as a synonym of O. battandieri by other sources
- Ophrys omegaifera H.Fleischm. – omega bee-orchid
- Ophrys reinholdii Spruner ex Fleischm. – Reinhold's bee-orchid
- Ophrys schulzei Bornm. & Fleischm.
- Ophrys scolopax Cav. – woodcock bee-orchid
- Ophrys speculum Link – mirror bee-orchid
- Ophrys sphegodes Mill. – early spider-orchid
- Ophrys tenthredinifera Willd.
- Ophrys umbilicata Desf.

=== Hybrids ===
Hybrids include:

- Ophrys × arachnitiformis Gren. & Philippe – false spider orchid (hybrid O. fuciflora × O. sphegodes)
- Ophrys × campolati O.Danesch & E.Danesch (hybrid O. bertolonii × O. sphegodes × O. tenthredinifera)
- Ophrys × dessartiana P.Delforge
- Ophrys × flavicans Vis. (hybrid O. bertolonii × O. sphegodes)
- Ophrys × pietzschii Kümpel ex Rumsey & H.J.Crouch (hybrid O. apifera × O. insectifera)
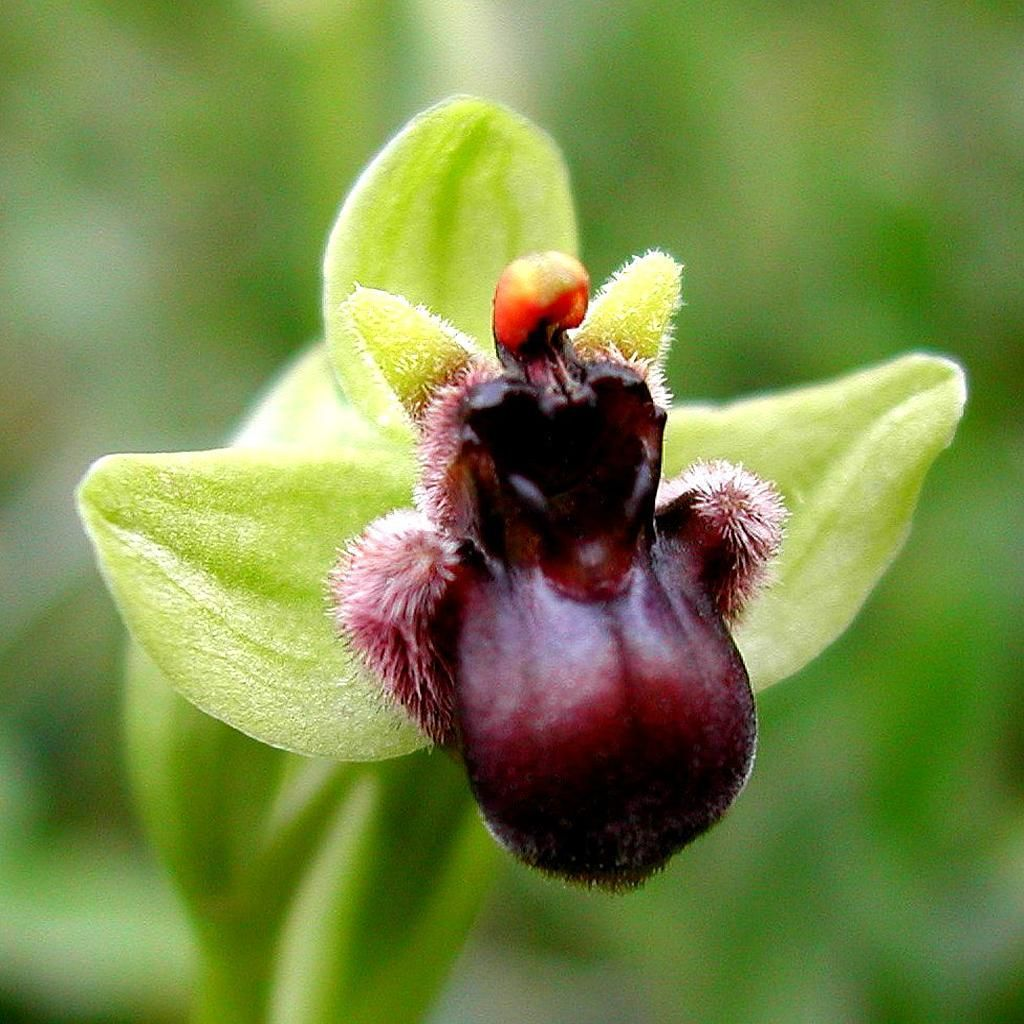
Ophrys bombyliflora (bumblebee orchid)

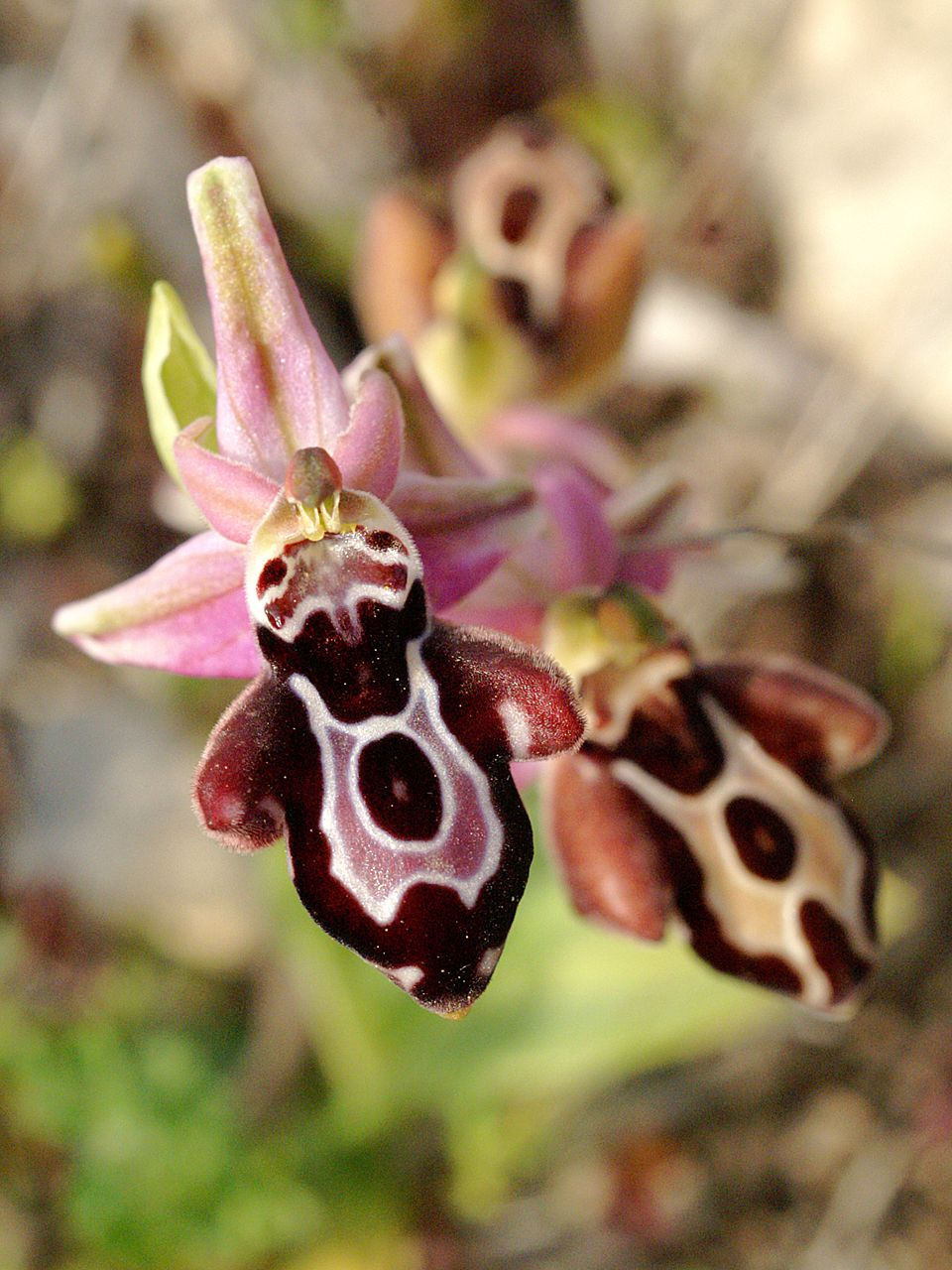
Ophrys cretica (Cretan bee-orchid)

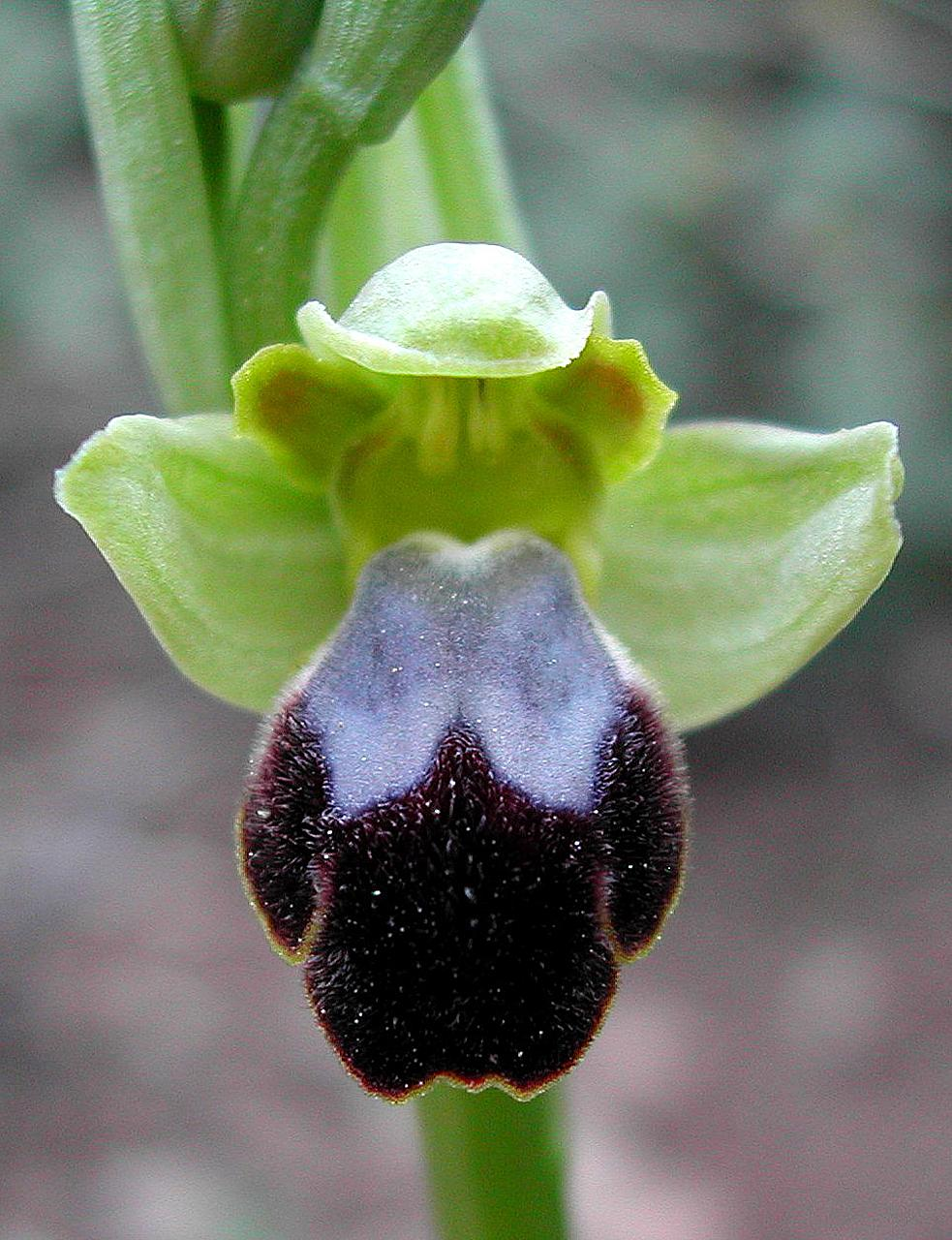
Ophrys fusca (sombre bee-orchid)

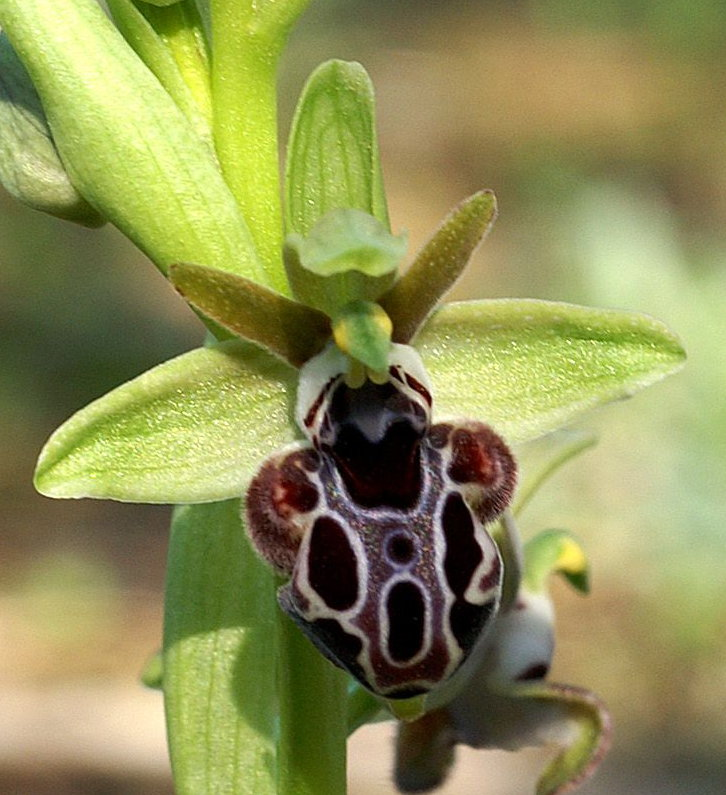
Ophrys kotschyi (Cyprus bee orchid)

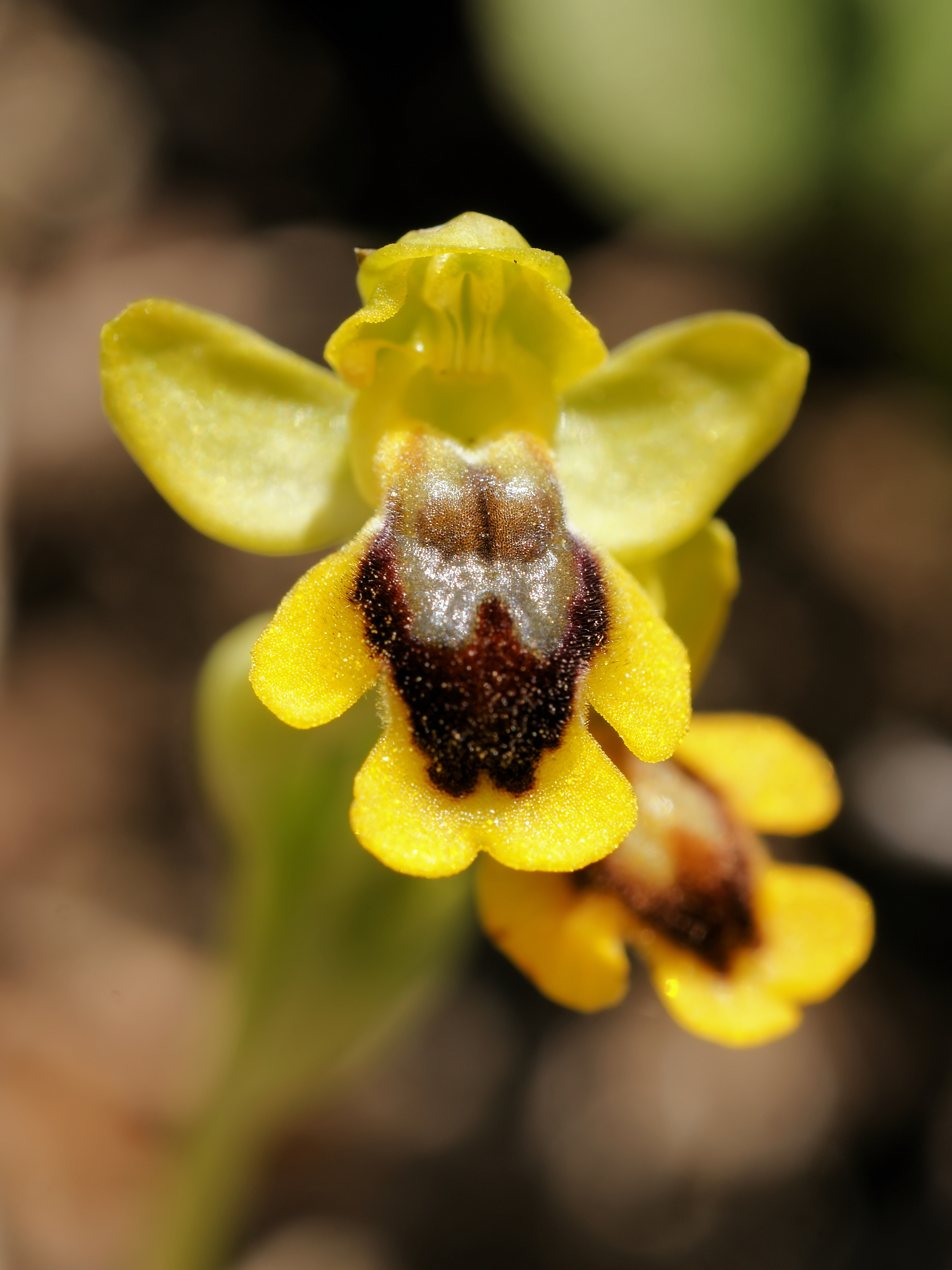
Ophrys lutea (yellow bee-orchid)

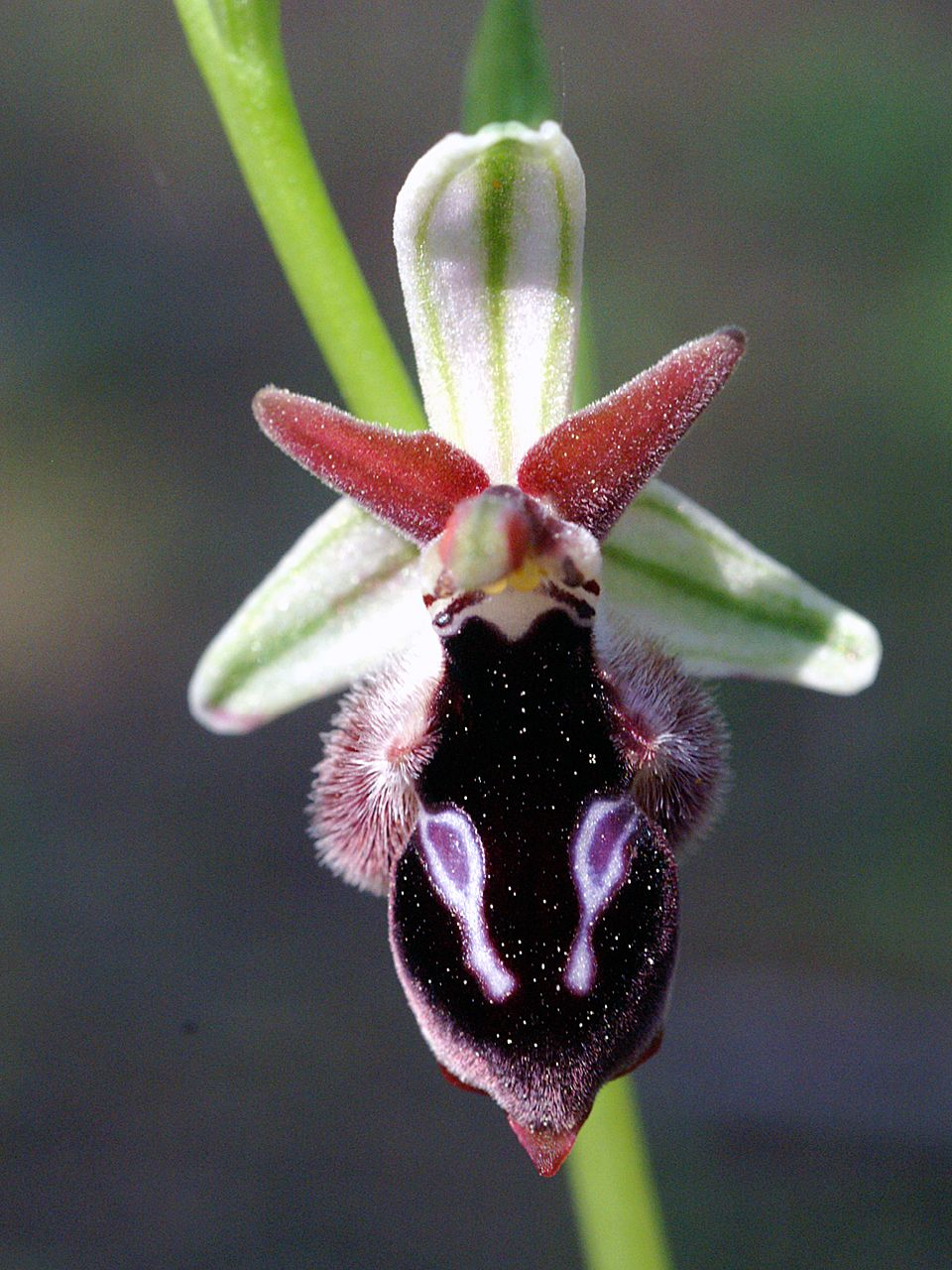
Ophrys reinholdii (Reinhold's bee-orchid)

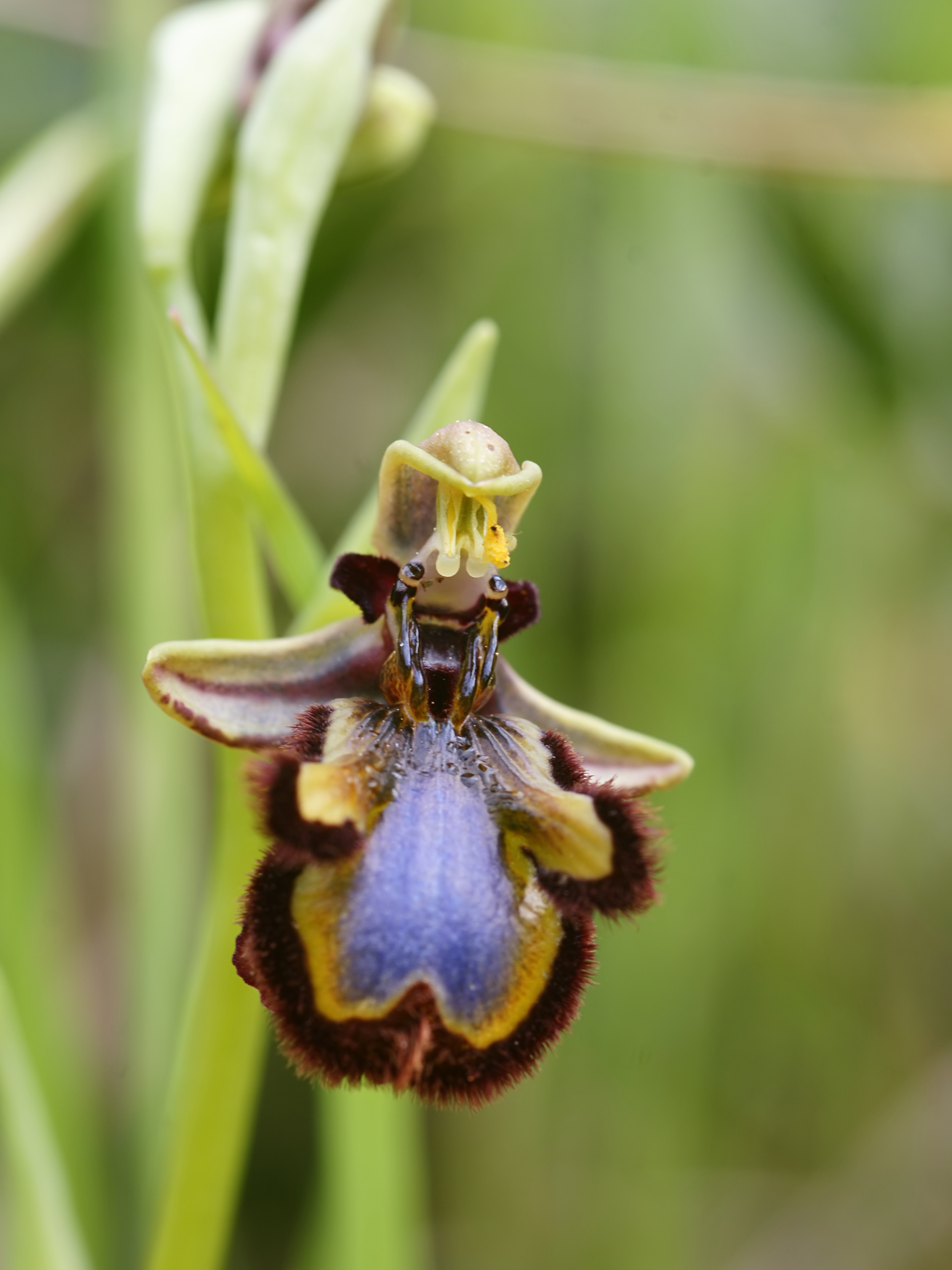
Ophrys speculum (mirror bee orchid)

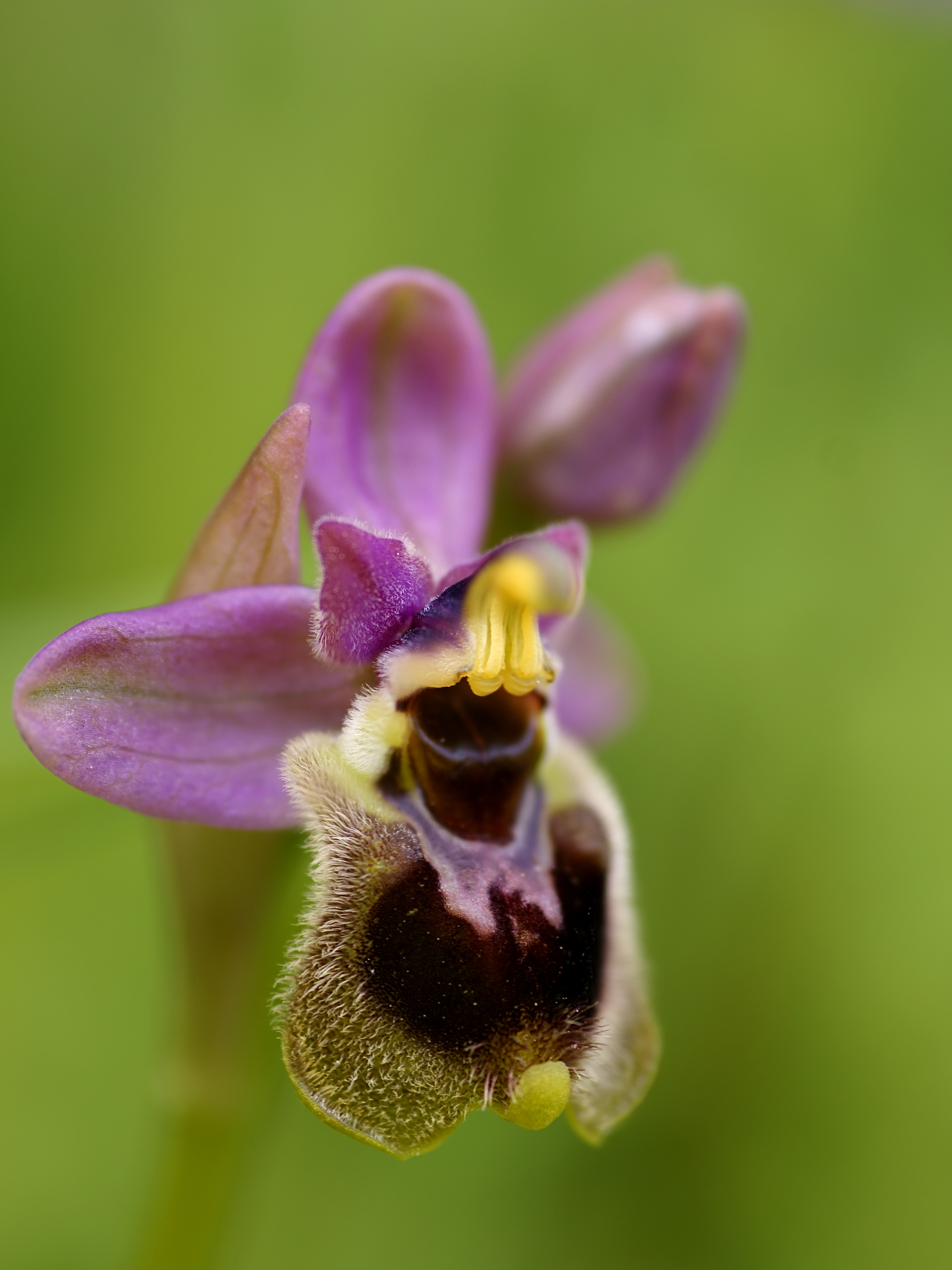
Ophrys tenthredinifera
