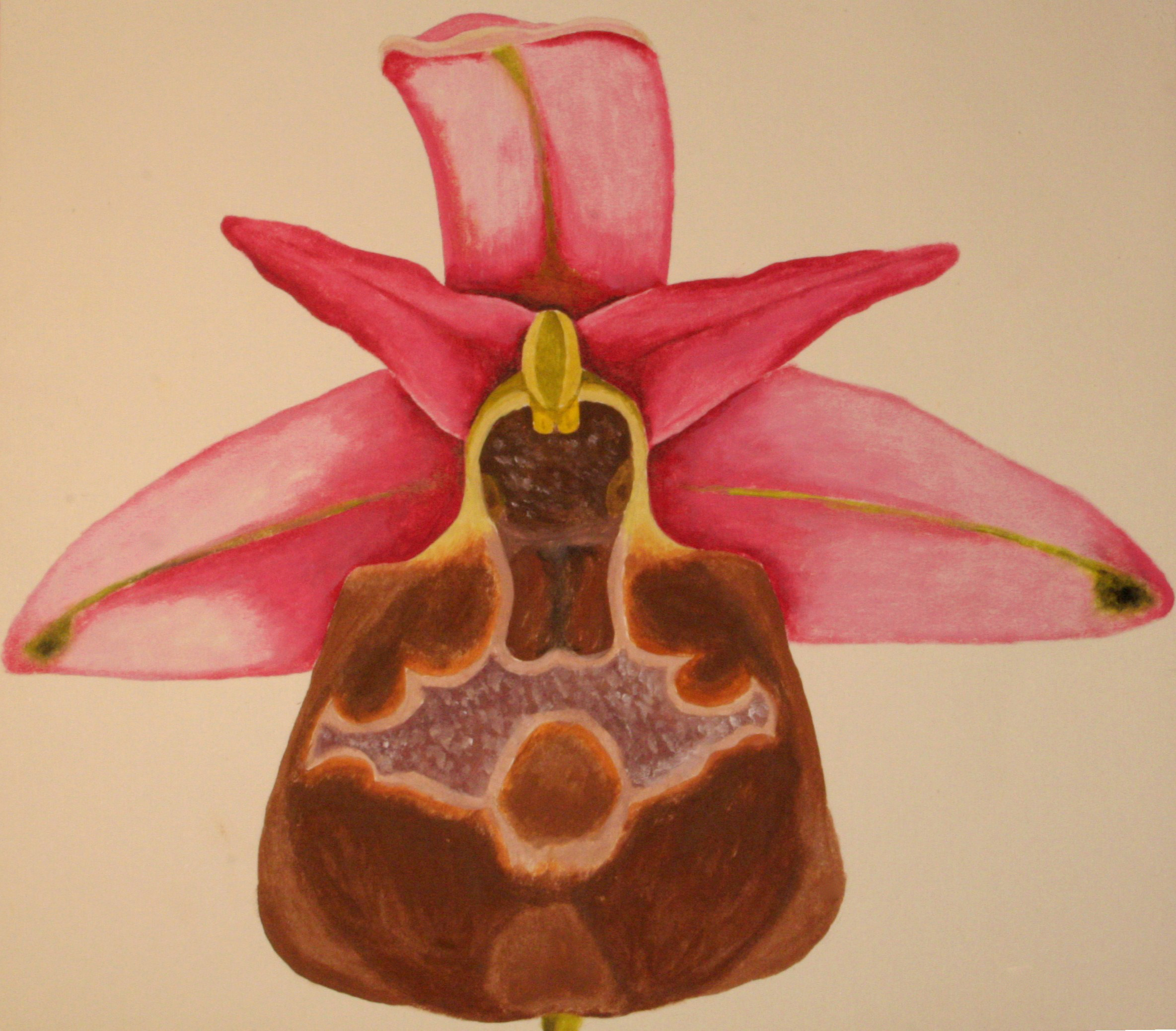
- Ophrys argolica subsp. biscutella

Scientific classification
- Kingdom: Plantae
- Clade: Tracheophytes
- Clade: Angiosperms
- Clade: Monocots
- Order: Asparagales
- Family: Orchidaceae
- Subfamily: Orchidoideae
- Genus: Ophrys
- Species: O. argolica

Binomial name
- Ophrys argolica H.Fleischm.

Synonyms
- Ophrys ferrum-equinum subsp. argolica (H.Fleischm.) Soó; Ophrys ferrum-equinum f. fallax Soó

= Ophrys argolica =

Species of orchid

Ophrys argolica, the late spider orchid, or Argolian bee-orchid, is a terrestrial species of orchid native to Greece, Italy, Croatia, Cyprus, Turkey, Lebanon and Syria. The epithet "argolica" refers to the Argolia region of Greece, southwest of Athens.

== Subspecies ==
At present (May 2014), 7 subspecies are recognized:

- Ophrys argolica subsp. aegaea (Kalteisen & H.R.Reinhard) H.A.Pedersen & Faurh. - Greek islands
- Ophrys argolica subsp. argolica - Greece
- Ophrys argolica subsp. biscutella (O.Danesch & E.Danesch) Kreutz - southern Italy, Croatia
- Ophrys argolica subsp. crabronifera (Sebast. & Mauri) Faurh. - central and southern Italy
- Ophrys argolica subsp. elegans (Renz) E.Nelson - Cyprus
- Ophrys argolica subsp. lesbis (Gölz & H.R.Reinhard) H.A.Pedersen & Faurh. - western Turkey and the Greek Islands
- Ophrys argolica subsp. lucis (Kalteisen & H.R.Reinhard) H.A.Pedersen & Faurh. - Turkey, Syria, Greek islands
