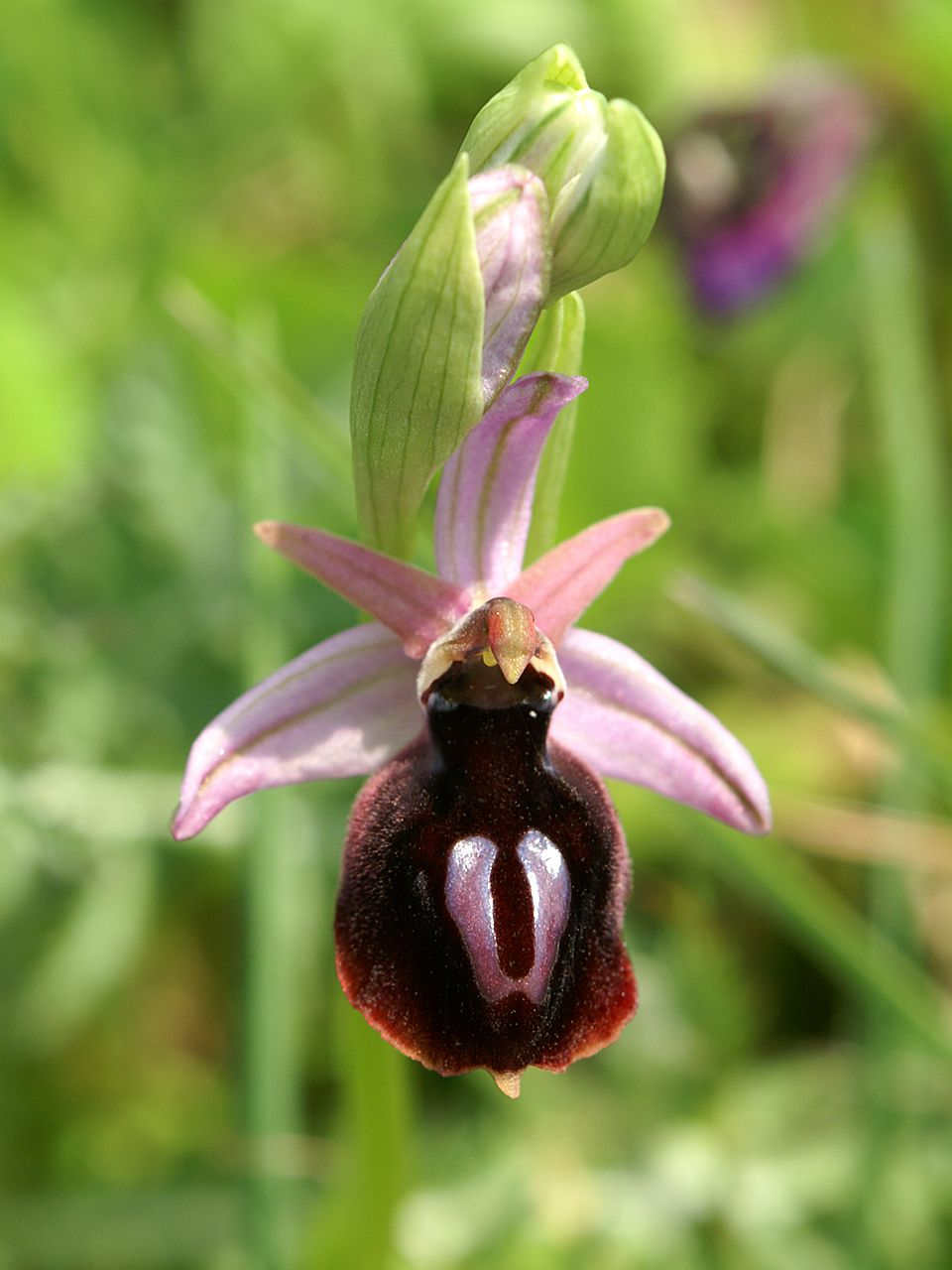
- Flower of Ophrys ferrum-equinum

Scientific classification
- Kingdom: Plantae
- Clade: Tracheophytes
- Clade: Angiosperms
- Clade: Monocots
- Order: Asparagales
- Family: Orchidaceae
- Subfamily: Orchidoideae
- Genus: Ophrys
- Species: O. ferrum-equinum

Binomial name
- Ophrys ferrum-equinum Desf.

= Ophrys ferrum-equinum =

Horseshoe bee-orchid

Species of plant

Ophrys ferrum-equinum, the horseshoe bee-orchid, is a terrestrial species of orchid native to Albania, Greece, and Turkey, including Crete and other islands of the Aegean. It owes its species name to the characteristic shape of a silver horse-shoe on the brown petal.

== Subspecies ==
Two subspecies are currently recognized (May 2014):

- Ophrys ferrum-equinum subsp. ferrum-equinum - Albania, Greece, Turkey
- Ophrys ferrum-equinum subsp. gottfriediana (Renz) E.Nelson - Greece
