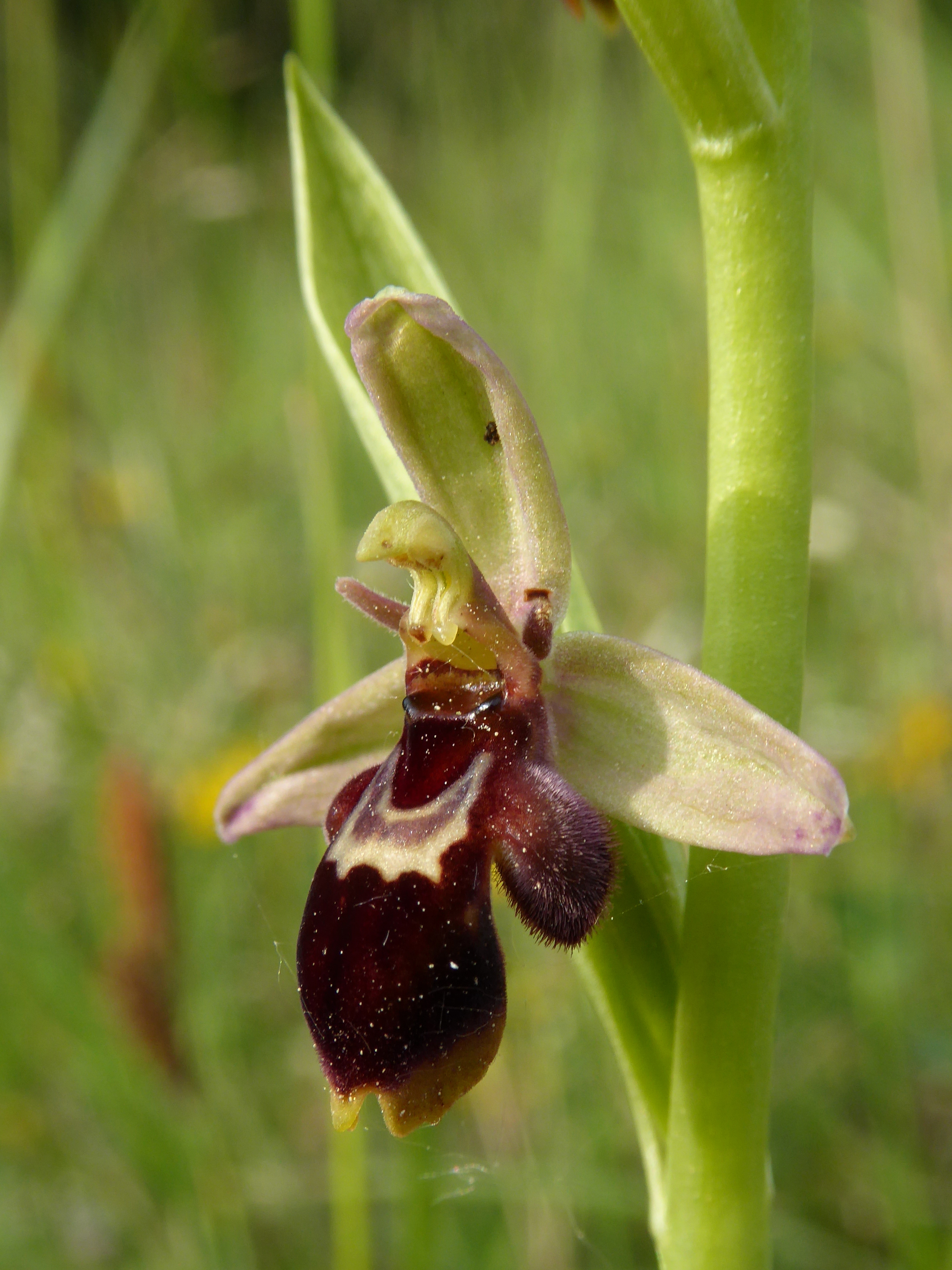

Scientific classification
- Kingdom: Plantae
- Clade: Tracheophytes
- Clade: Angiosperms
- Clade: Monocots
- Order: Asparagales
- Family: Orchidaceae
- Subfamily: Orchidoideae
- Genus: Ophrys
- Species: O. × pietzschii

Binomial name
- Ophrys × pietzschii Kümpel ex Rumsey & H.J.Crouch

= Ophrys × pietzschii =

Hybrid species of orchid

Ophrys × pietzschii is a hybrid species of orchid in the family Orchidaceae. It is extirpated from Great Britain and is now endemic to Germany. It is a hybrid of O. apifera and O. insectifera.
