= Ophrys × dessartiana =

Scientific classification
- Kingdom: Plantae
- Clade: Tracheophytes
- Clade: Angiosperms
- Clade: Monocots
- Order: Asparagales
- Family: Orchidaceae
- Subfamily: Orchidoideae
- Genus: Ophrys
- Species: O. × dessartiana

Binomial name
- Ophrys × dessartiana P.Delforge

Synonyms
- Ophrys × quitadamoi Medagli & Turco; Ophrys × sancti-martinii (Mifsud) Soca; Ophrys × tumentia Mifsud; Ophrys × tumentia subsp. sancti-martinii Mifsud

Hybrid species of orchid

Ophrys × dessartiana, synonyms including Ophrys × tumentia, is a hybrid plant species in the family Orchidaceae (orchids). As of September 2025, Plants of the World Online treated the species as "unplaced".
