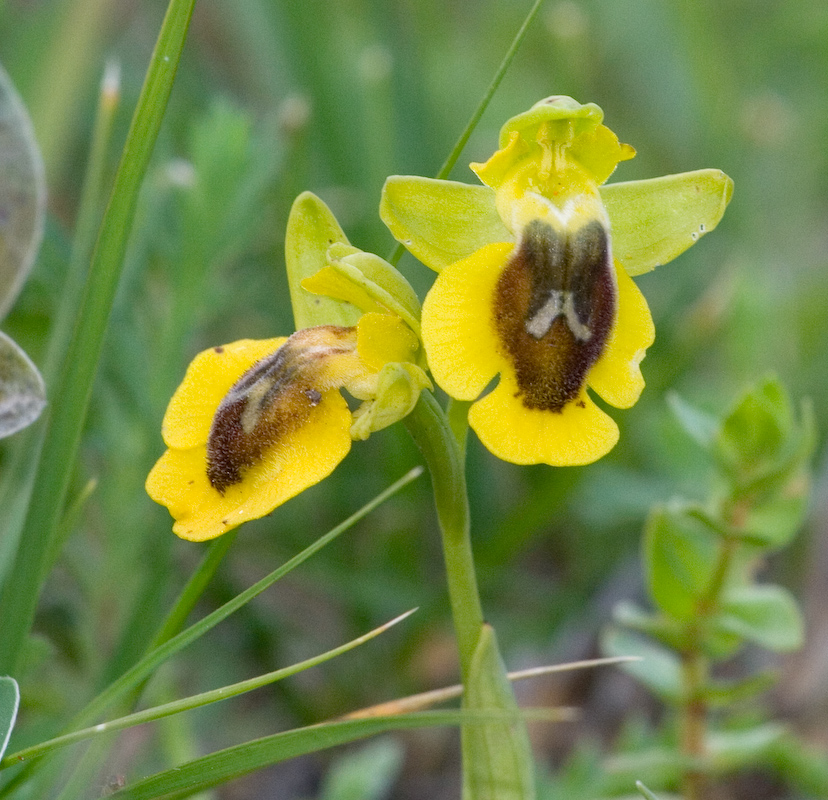

Conservation status
- Least Concern (IUCN 3.1)

Scientific classification
- Kingdom: Plantae
- Clade: Tracheophytes
- Clade: Angiosperms
- Clade: Monocots
- Order: Asparagales
- Family: Orchidaceae
- Subfamily: Orchidoideae
- Genus: Ophrys
- Species: O. lutea

Binomial name
- Ophrys lutea Cav.

Synonyms
- Arachnites luteus (Cav.) Tod.

= Ophrys lutea =

Species of flowering plant in the orchid family Orchidaceae

Ophrys lutea, the yellow bee-orchid, is a species of orchid native to southern Europe, North Africa, and the Middle East, the range extending from Portugal and Morocco to Syria.

== Description of the flower ==
Broad asymmetric lateral sepals, dorsal sepal lowered.

Extended petals, yellow or with a blue-grey or brown spotted velvety macula. Pollinated by male Andrena bees. This species is notable among Ophrys for the fact that the pollinating bees sit on the labellum facing away from the pollinaria instead of facing towards them, and thus collect the pollinaria with their abdomen.

== Subspecies ==
Numerous subspecific names have been proposed, but as of Sep 2023 the following are currently accepted:

- Ophrys lutea subsp. aspea (Devillers-Tersch. & Devillers) Faurh. - Northern Tunisia to Northern Libya
- Ophrys lutea subsp. galilaea (H.Fleischm. & Bornm.) Soó - Mediterranean
- Ophrys lutea subsp. laurensis (Geniez & Melki) Kreutz - Sicily
- Ophrys lutea subsp. lutea Cav. - Western and Central Mediterranean to Crete
- Ophrys lutea subsp. phryganae (Devillers-Tersch. & Devillers) Melki - Central and Eastern Mediterranean

== Flowering period ==
March to May

== Habitat ==
The orchid grows in full sun or shade on limey dry or damp soils, pastures, and thin woodland.

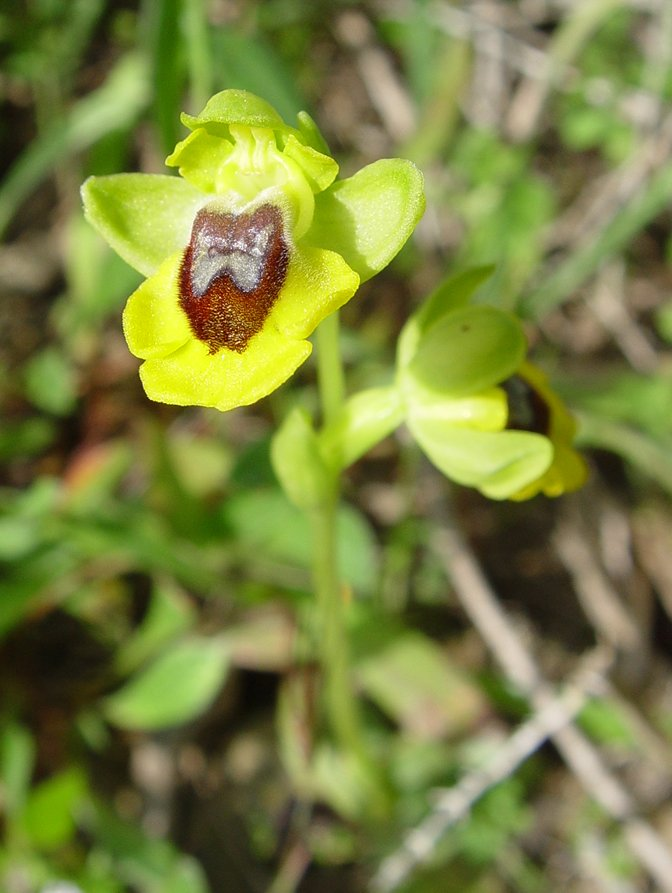
Yellow bee-orchid

from the French Wikipedia; technical translation of some words still needing checking
