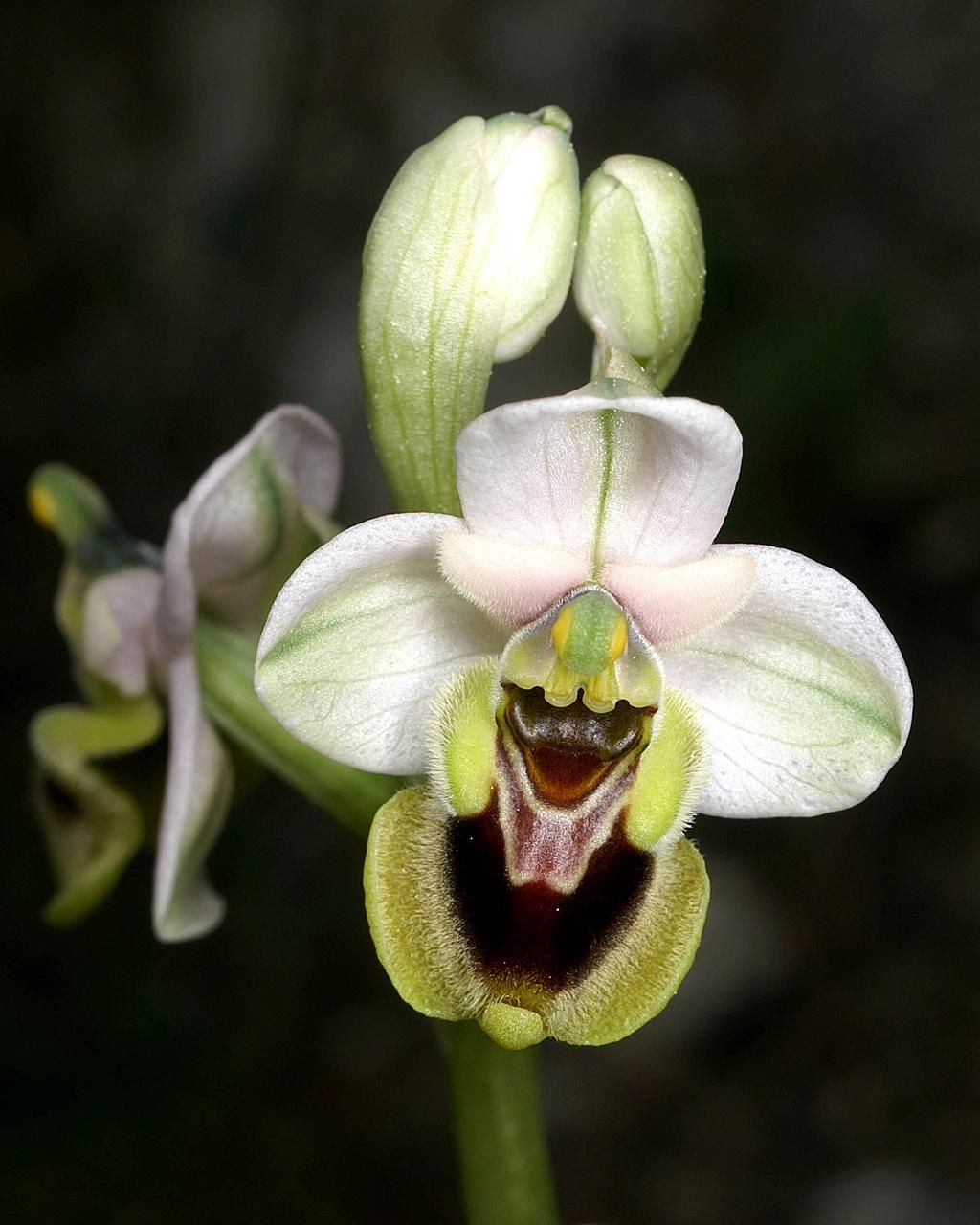
- Sawfly orchid in Mallorca

Scientific classification
- Kingdom: Plantae
- Clade: Tracheophytes
- Clade: Angiosperms
- Clade: Monocots
- Order: Asparagales
- Family: Orchidaceae
- Subfamily: Orchidoideae
- Genus: Ophrys
- Species: O. tenthredinifera

Binomial name
- Ophrys tenthredinifera Willd.

Synonyms
- Arachnites tenthrediniferus (Willd.) Tod.; Ophrys insectifera var. rosea Desf.; Ophrys villosa Desf.; Ophrys grandiflora Ten.; Ophrys tenoreana Lindl.; Arachnites limbatus Link; Ophrys limbata Link; Ophrys neglecta Parl.; Ophrys rosea (Desf.) Dufour; Ophrys tabanifera Sieber ex Nyman; Ophrys di-stefani Lojac; Ophrys hookeri Orph. ex Soó; Ophrys tetuanensis Pau; Ophrys aprilia Devillers & Devillers-Tersch.; Ophrys dictynnae P.Delforge; Ophrys leochroma P.Delforge; Ophrys ulyssea P.Delforge; Ophrys spectabilis (Kreutz & Zelesny) Paulus; Ophrys korae M.Hirth & Paulus; Ophrys leochroma var. sanctae-marcellae (Saliaris, A.Saliaris & A.Alibertis) P.Delforge; Ophrys neglecta var. riphaea F.M.Vázquez

= Ophrys tenthredinifera =

Sawfly orchid

Species of flowering plant in the orchid family

Ophrys tenthredinifera, or the sawfly orchid, is a terrestrial species of orchid native to the Mediterranean region from Portugal and Morocco to Turkey. The common name refers to a purported resemblance between the flower and the sawfly, a wasp-like insect.

Many subspecies, varieties and forms have been proposed, but as of May 2014, none are recognized.
