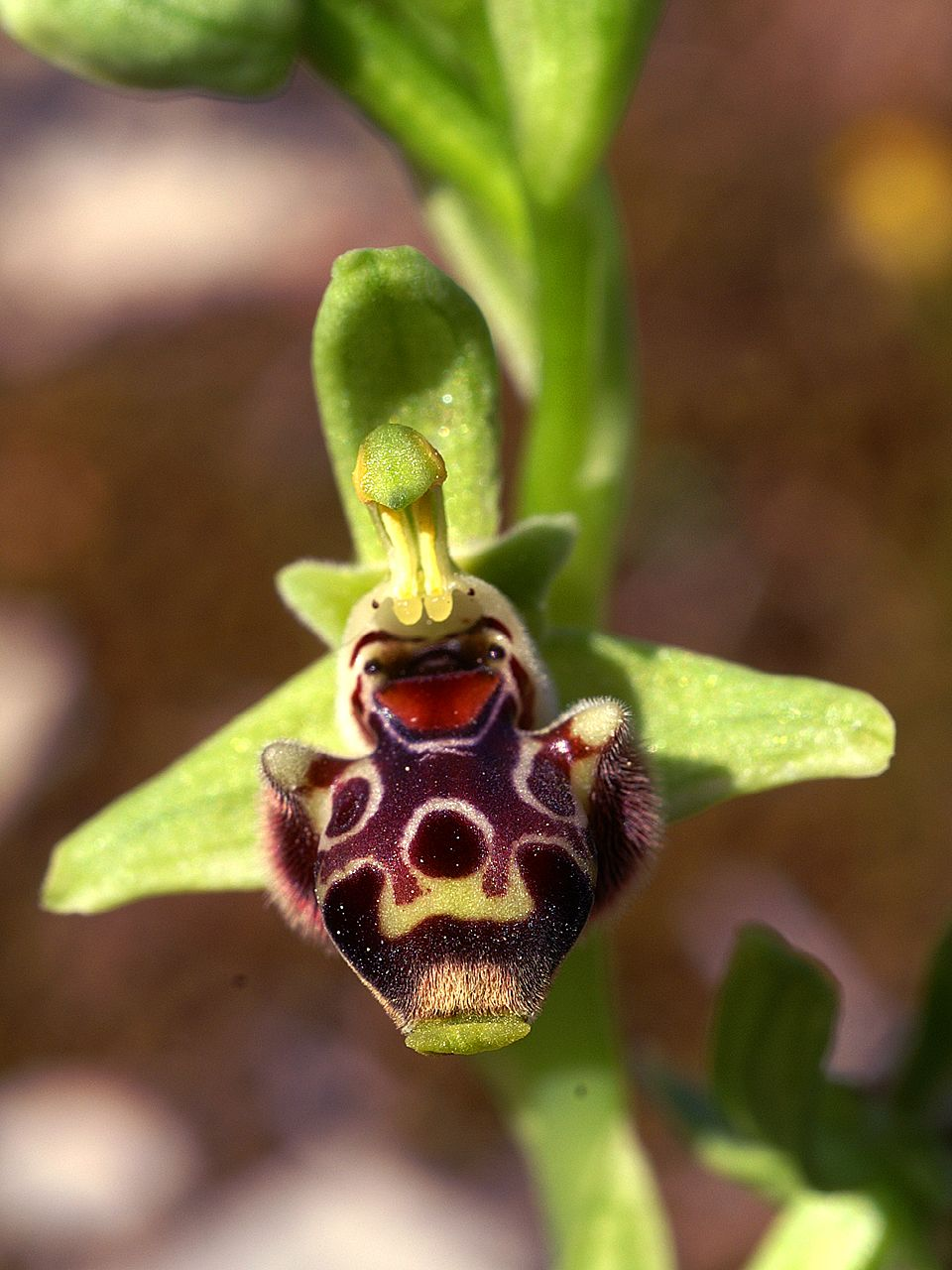
- Flower of Ophrys umbilicata

Scientific classification
- Kingdom: Plantae
- Clade: Tracheophytes
- Clade: Angiosperms
- Clade: Monocots
- Order: Asparagales
- Family: Orchidaceae
- Subfamily: Orchidoideae
- Genus: Ophrys
- Species: O. umbilicata

Binomial name
- Ophrys umbilicata Desf.

= Ophrys umbilicata =

Species of orchid

Ophrys umbilicata is a species of orchid found from Albania to Iran, including Greece, Israel, Lebanon, Turkey and Cyprus.

== Description ==
Ophyrys umbilicata is a perennial, erect, glabrous herb, 10–20 cm high. Leaves alternate, simple, entire, thick, narrowly elliptic with parallel nerves. Flowers spirally arranged on top of the shoot, sepals 10-15 x 6–9 mm, petals small. Labellum broader on other half 9–12 mm, 3-dentate on the apex, purple-blackish. Flowers March–April. Fruit a capsule. Habitat garigue, Maquis and open pine woodlands at 0–600 m altitude.

== Subspecies ==
At present (May 2014), 7 subspecies are recognized:

- Ophrys umbilicata subsp. beerii Shifman - Palestine
- Ophrys umbilicata subsp. bucephala (Gölz & H.R.Reinhard) Biel - Turkey and the Greek islands
- Ophrys umbilicata subsp. calycadniensis Perschke - Turkey
- Ophrys umbilicata subsp. flavomarginata (Renz) Faurh. - Cyprus, Lebanon, Syria, Palestine
- Ophrys umbilicata subsp. lapethica (Gölz & H.R.Reinhard) Faurh. - Cyprus
- Ophrys umbilicata subsp. latakiana (M.Schönfelder & H.Schönfelder) Faurh. & H.A.Pedersen - Turkey, Syria
- Ophrys umbilicata subsp. umbilicata - from Albania to Iran
