= Giles Munby =

British naturalist (1813–1876)

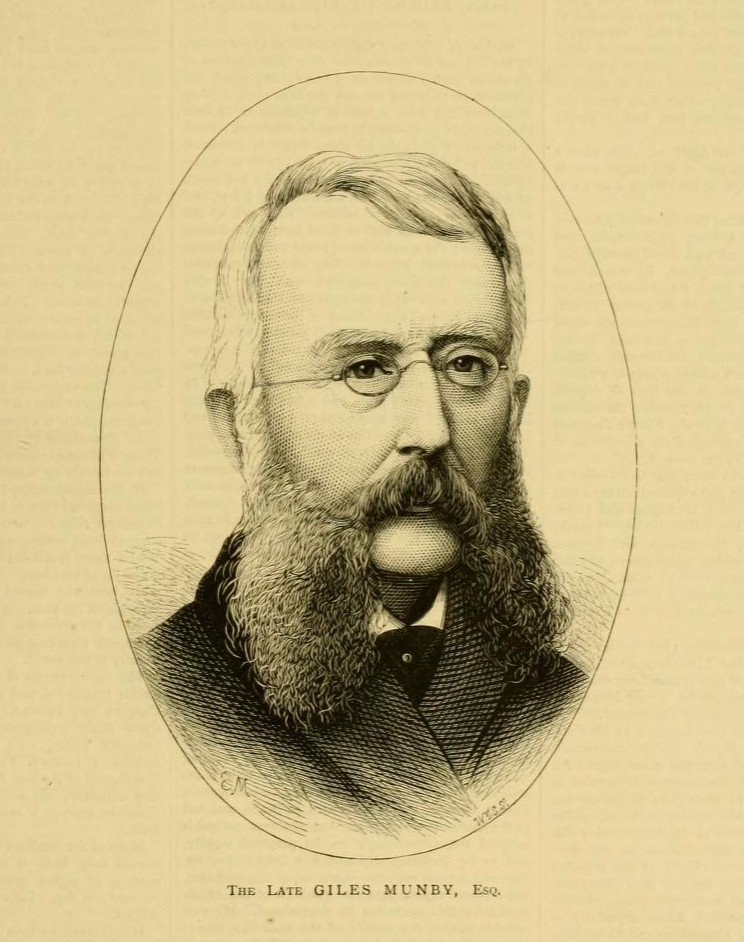
Giles Munby

Giles Munby (1813–1876) was an English botanist. His major work concerned plants in North Africa, where he lived for 15 years.

== Life ==
Born at York, was the youngest son of Joseph Munby, a solicitor and under-sheriff of Yorkshire, but was orphaned when still very young. On leaving school Munby was apprenticed to a surgeon named Brown in York, and was involved in attending to the poor during the cholera epidemic of 1832. Entering the medical school of the University of Edinburgh, he attended the botanical lectures and excursions held by Robert Graham.

Munby then "walked the hospitals" in London and, in 1835, in Paris, where he began a lifelong friendship with John Percy. Together they studied under Adrien-Henri de Jussieu and his assistants, Jean Baptiste Antoine Guillemin and Joseph Decaisne, and Munby passed the examinations for the degree of M.D. at the University of Montpellier. They visited Dijon and, after returning to Edinburgh, started once more, in 1836, for the south of France.

Shortly afterwards Munby started work in France at Saint-Bertrand-de-Comminges, Haute-Garonne, acting as curator of the museum of Nérée Boubée and giving lessons in botany. In 1839 he took up the offer of a free passage from Marseille to Constantinople. Unfavourable winds landed him at Algiers, where he then lived in from 1839 to 1844. He collected plants, grew oranges, shot and practised medicine among the Arabs and French soldiers.

On his marriage in 1844 Munby settled at La Senia, a small estate near Oran; in 1859 for his wife's health they moved to Montpellier, where she died in 1860. Munby then returned to England, living first at Wood Green, and in 1867 at the Holt, near Farnham, Surrey. He devoted himself to the cultivation of Algerian plants and bulbs, and died there of inflammation of the lungs on 12 April 1876. Munby was an original member of the Botanical Society of Edinburgh, and in his later years he joined the Royal Horticultural Society, becoming a member of the scientific committee. He distributed several centuries of the exsiccata "Plantæ Algerienses exsiccatæ", and on his death his herbarium was presented to Kew Gardens.The name Munbya was given to two genera of plants, both later merged into others.

== Works ==
Munby's first publications were notes on the botany and entomology of trips with Percy, contributed to the Magazine of Natural History run by John Claudius Loudon and Edward Charlesworth in 1836–7. He was a vegetable anatomist, collector and acute discriminator of living plants. His two major works were the Flore de l'Algérie and the Catalogus Plantarum in Algeriâ … nascentium. The Flore de l'Algérie, Paris, 1847, contains eighteen hundred species arranged on the Linnæan system, with six plates from drawings by his sister. Two hundred of his species, belonging to thirty genera (ten of those being new to science), were additions to René Louiche Desfontaines's Flora Atlantica, 1804. The Catalogus Plantarum in Algeriâ … nascentium, Oran, 1859, contained 2,600 species, of which 800 were new; and the second edition (London, 1866) contained 364 additional species.

The standard author abbreviation Munby is used to indicate this person as the author when citing a botanical name.

== Family ==
Munby married, first, in 1844, Jane Welsford, daughter of Nathaniel Welsford, the British consul at Oran, who died in February 1860, leaving two sons and three daughters; and, secondly, in 1862, Eliza M. A. Buckeridge, who survived him. Arthur Munby was the son of his brother Joseph.
