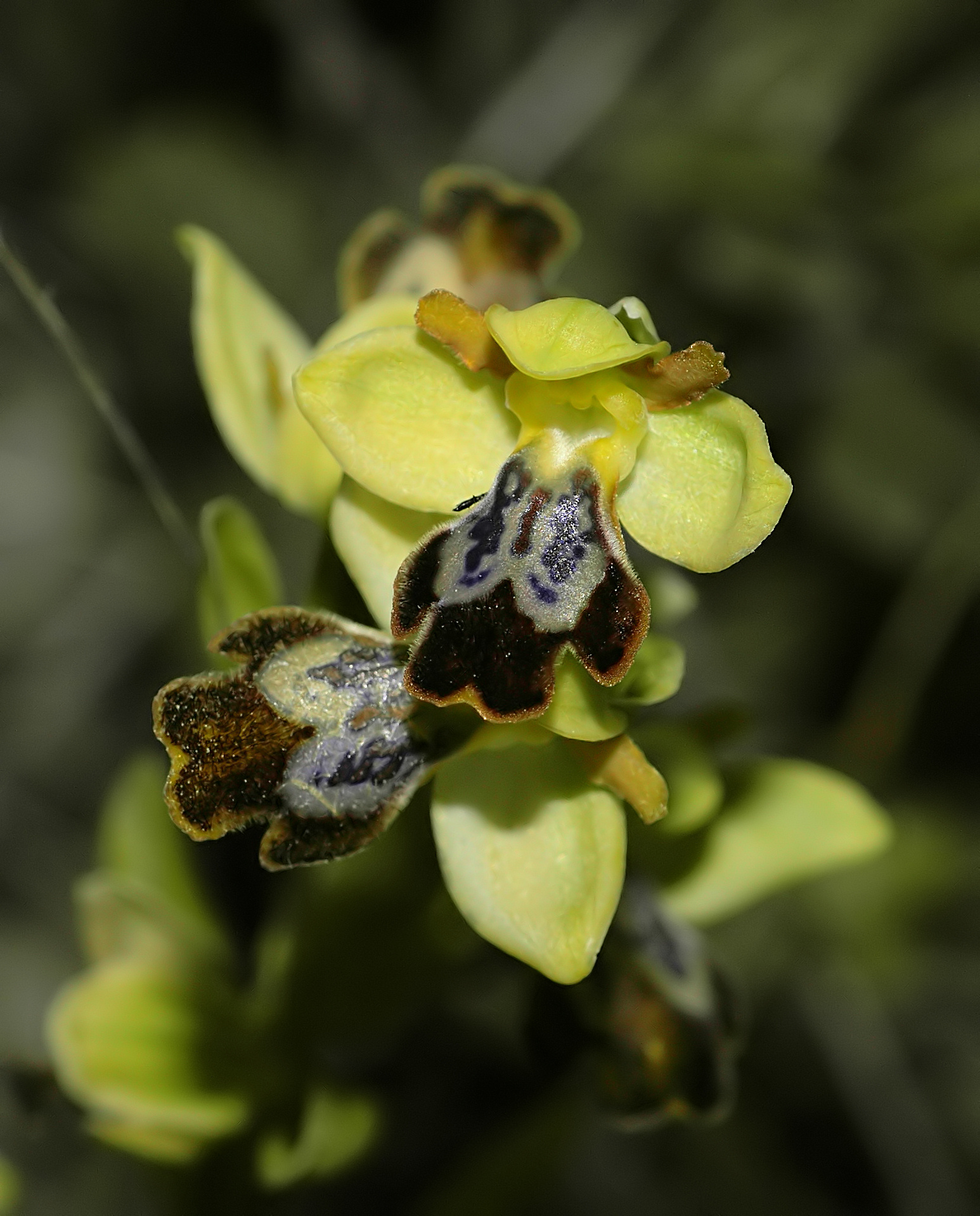
- Flower of Ophrys fusca

Scientific classification
- Kingdom: Plantae
- Clade: Tracheophytes
- Clade: Angiosperms
- Clade: Monocots
- Order: Asparagales
- Family: Orchidaceae
- Subfamily: Orchidoideae
- Genus: Ophrys
- Species: O. fusca

Binomial name
- Ophrys fusca Link

Synonyms
- List: Arachnites fuscus (Link) Tod.; Arachnites pallidus (Raf.) Tod.; Ophrys achillis P.Delforge; Ophrys africana G.Foelsche & W.Foelsche; Ophrys akhdarensis (B.Baumann & H.Baumann) P.Delforge; Ophrys aranifera subsp. moesziana Soó; Ophrys arnoldii P.Delforge; Ophrys astypalaeica P.Delforge; Ophrys atlantica Munby; Ophrys atlantica subsp. durieui (Rchb.f.) Maire & Weiller; Ophrys attaviria D.Rückbr., U.Rückbr., Wenker & S.Wenker; Ophrys attaviria var. cesmeensis (Kreutz) P.Delforge; Ophrys attaviria subsp. cesmeensis Kreutz; Ophrys attaviria f. eptapigiensis (Paulus) P.Delforge; Ophrys attaviria f. thracica (Kreutz) P.Delforge; Ophrys bilunulata Risso; Ophrys bilunulata subsp. caesiella (P.Delforge) Paulus; Ophrys bilunulata subsp. kalirachiensis Paulus, M.Hirth & Dimadis; Ophrys bilunulata subsp. punctulata (Renz) Paulus; Ophrys bilunulata subsp. sancti-isidorii (A.Saliaris, Saliaris & A.Alibertis) Paulus; Ophrys blitopertha Paulus & Gack; Ophrys caesiella P.Delforge; Ophrys calocaerina Devillers-Tersch. & Devillers; Ophrys cesmeensis (Kreutz) P.Delforge; Ophrys cinereophila Paulus & Gack; Ophrys clara F.M.Vázquez & S.Ramos; Ophrys creberrima Paulus; Ophrys cressa Paulus; Ophrys creticola Paulus; Ophrys decembris S.Moingeon & J.-M.Moingeon; Ophrys delforgei vDevillers-Tersch. & Devillers; Ophrys dianica M.R.Lowe, J.Piera, M.B.Crespo & J.E.Arnold; Ophrys eleonorae Devillers-Tersch. & Devillers; Ophrys eptapigiensis Paulus; Ophrys fabrella Paulus & Ayasse ex P.Delforge; Ophrys fenarolii Ferlan; Ophrys ficuzzana H.Baumann & Künkele; Ophrys flammeola P.Delforge; Ophrys forestieri Lojac.; Ophrys funerea Viv.; Ophrys fusca subsp. akhdarensis B.Baumann & H.Baumann; Ophrys fusca subsp. arnoldii (P.Delforge) Kreutz; Ophrys fusca subsp. atlantica (Munby) E.G.Camus; Ophrys fusca subsp. attaviria (D.Rückbr., U.Rückbr., Wenker & S.Wenker) Kreutz; Ophrys fusca subsp. bilunulata (Risso) Kreutz; Ophrys fusca subsp. caesiella (P.Delforge) Kreutz; Ophrys fusca subsp. calocaerina (Devillers-Tersch. & Devillers) Kreutz; Ophrys fusca subsp. cesmeensis (Kreutz) Kreutz; Ophrys fusca subsp. clara (F.M.Vázquez & S.Ramos) F.M.Vázquez; Ophrys fusca subsp. creberrima (Paulus) H.Kretzschmar; Ophrys fusca subsp. cressa (Paulus) H.Kretzschmar; Ophrys fusca subsp. creticola (Paulus) H.Kretzschmar; Ophrys fusca subsp. delforgei (Devillers-Tersch. & Devillers) Kreutz; Ophrys fusca var. distincta F.M.Vázquez; Ophrys fusca subsp. eptapigiensis (Paulus) Kreutz; Ophrys fusca subsp. fabrella (Paulus & Ayasse ex P.Delforge) Kreutz; Ophrys fusca subsp. flammeola (P.Delforge) Kreutz; Ophrys fusca var. forestieri Rchb.f.; Ophrys fusca subsp. forestieri (Rchb.f.) Kreutz; Ophrys fusca subsp. gackiae (P.Delforge) Kreutz; Ophrys fusca subsp. gazella (Devillers-Tersch. & Devillers) Kreutz; Ophrys fusca subsp. hespera (Devillers-Tersch. & Devillers) Kreutz; Ophrys fusca subsp. laureotica Kalog., Delipetrou & A.Alibertis; Ophrys fusca subsp. leucadica (Renz) H.Kretzschmar; Ophrys fusca subsp. limensis F.M.Vázquez; Ophrys fusca subsp. lindia (Paulus) Kreutz; Ophrys fusca subsp. lindleyana F.M.Vázquez; Ophrys fusca subsp. lucana (P.Delforge, Devillers-Tersch. & Devillers) Kreutz; Ophrys fusca subsp. lucentina (P.Delforge) Kreutz; Ophrys fusca subsp. lucifera (Devillers-Tersch. & Devillers) Kreutz; Ophrys fusca subsp. lupercalis (Devillers-Tersch. & Devillers) Kreutz; Ophrys fusca var. lutea F.M.Vázquez; Ophrys fusca var. lutescens F.M.Vázquez; Ophrys fusca var. maculata Balayer; Ophrys fusca subsp. maghrebiaca Kreutz, Rebbas, Babali, Miara & Ait-Hamm.; Ophrys fusca subsp. marmorata (G.Foelsche & W.Foelsche) Kreutz; Ophrys fusca subsp. minima Balayer; Ophrys fusca subsp. obaesa (Lojac.) E.G.Camus; Ophrys fusca subsp. ortuabis (M.P.Grasso & Manca) Kreutz; Ophrys fusca subsp. parosica (P.Delforge) Kreutz; Ophrys fusca subsp. parvula (Paulus) Kreutz; Ophrys fusca subsp. pectus (Mutel) Kreutz; Ophrys fusca subsp. peraiolae (G.Foelsche, W.Foelsche, M.Gerbaud & O.Gerbaud) Kreutz; Ophrys fusca subsp. perpusilla (Devillers-Tersch. & Devillers) Kreutz; Ophrys fusca subsp. persephonae (Paulus) Kreutz; Ophrys fusca subsp. phaseliana (D.Rückbr. & U.Rückbr.) Kreutz; Ophrys fusca subsp. proxima (C.E.Hermos., Benito & Soca) F.M.Vázquez; Ophrys fusca lusus ramosis F.M.Vázquez; Ophrys fusca var. rubescens Balayer; Ophrys fusca subsp. sabulosa (Paulus & Gack ex P.Delforge) Kreutz; Ophrys fusca subsp. sancti-isidorii A.Saliaris, Saliaris & A.Alibertis; Ophrys fusca subsp. thracica Kreutz; Ophrys fusca subsp. thriptiensis (Paulus) H.Kretzschmar; Ophrys fusca subsp. zonata (Devillers-Tersch. & Devillers) Kreutz; Ophrys gackiae P.Delforge; Ophrys × gauthieri nothosubsp. fenarolii (Ferlan) H.Baumann & Künkele; Ophrys gazella Devillers-Tersch. & Devillers; Ophrys hespera Devillers-Tersch. & Devillers; Ophrys hospitalis P.Delforge; Ophrys intermedia Tineo ex Lojac.; Ophrys iricolor Desf.; Ophrys iricolor subsp. astypalaeica (P.Delforge) Kreutz; Ophrys iricolor subsp. eleonorae (Devillers-Tersch. & Devillers) Paulus & Gack; Ophrys iricolor subsp. hospitalis (P.Delforge) Mifsud & L.Lewis; Ophrys iricolor subsp. lojaconoi (P.Delforge) Kreutz; Ophrys iricolor subsp. maxima (A.Terracc.) Paulus & Gack; Ophrys iricolor subsp. mesaritica (Paulus, C.Alibertis & A.Alibertis) Kreutz; Ophrys iricolor subsp. vallesiana (Devillers-Tersch. & Devillers) Paulus & Gack; Ophrys kedra Paulus; Ophrys laetea Willk. & Lange; Ophrys leucadica Renz; Ophrys lindia Paulus; Ophrys lindleyana H.Fleischm. ex G.Keller & Soó; Ophrys lojaconoi P.Delforge; Ophrys lucana P.Delforge, Devillers-Tersch. & Devillers; Ophrys lucentina P.Delforge; Ophrys lucifera Devillers-Tersch. & Devillers; Ophrys lupercalis Devillers-Tersch. & Devillers; Ophrys lutea subsp. funerea (Viv.) Batt.; Ophrys lutea subsp. subfusca (Rchb.f.) Murb.; Ophrys lutea var. subfusca Rchb.f.; Ophrys maghrebiaca (Kreutz, Rebbas, Babali, Miara & Ait-Hamm.) P.Delforge; Ophrys malacitana M.R.Lowe, I.Phillips & Paulus; Ophrys marmorata G.Foelsche & W.Foelsche; Ophrys marmorata subsp. caesiella (P.Delforge) Véla & R.Martin; Ophrys meropes P.Delforge; Ophrys mesaritica Paulus, C.Alibertis & A.Alibertis; Ophrys myodes Lapeyr.; Ophrys obaesa Lojac.; Ophrys ortuabis M.P.Grasso & Manca; Ophrys pallida Raf.; Ophrys pallidula Paulus; Ophrys parosica P.Delforge; Ophrys parosica var. phaseliana (D.Rückbr. & U.Rückbr.) P.Delforge; Ophrys parvula Paulus; Ophrys pectus Mutel; Ophrys peraiolae G.Foelsche, W.Foelsche, M.Gerbaud & O.Gerbaud; Ophrys peraiolae var. rubra G.Foelsche, W.Foelsche, M.Gerbaud & O.Gerbaud; Ophrys perpusilla Devillers-Tersch. & Devillers; Ophrys persephonae Paulus; Ophrys phaidra Paulus; Ophrys phaseliana D.Rückbr. & U.Rückbr.; Ophrys pratesii Gennaio, M.Gargiulo, Chetta & Medagli; Ophrys proxima C.E.Hermos., Benito & Soca; Ophrys pseudomigoutiana R.Martin, Véla & Ouni; Ophrys punctulata Renz; Ophrys rueckbrodtiana W.Hahn; Ophrys sabulosa Paulus & Gack ex P.Delforge; Ophrys sancti-isidorii (A.Saliaris, Saliaris & A.Alibertis) P.Delforge; Ophrys sicula var. flammeola (P.Delforge) Hennecke; Ophrys sicula var. urteae (Paulus) Hennecke; Ophrys sphegodes subsp. moesziana (Soó) Maire; Ophrys subfusca (Rchb.f.) Hausskn.; Ophrys subfusca subsp. blitopertha (Paulus & Gack) Kreutz; Ophrys subfusca subsp. cinereophila (Paulus & Gack) Kreutz; Ophrys subfusca subsp. fenarolii (Ferlan) Del Prete; Ophrys subfusca subsp. flammeola (P.Delforge) Kreutz; Ophrys subfusca subsp. lucentina (P.Delforge) Kreutz; Ophrys subfusca subsp. persephonae (Paulus) Kreutz; Ophrys sulcata Devillers-Tersch. & Devillers; Ophrys theophrasti Devillers & Devillers-Tersch.; Ophrys thracica (Kreutz) Devillers & Devillers-Tersch.; Ophrys thriptiensis Paulus; Ophrys tricolor Desf. ex Nyman; Ophrys urteae Paulus; Ophrys vallesiana Devillers-Tersch. & Devillers; Ophrys varinoi Soca; Ophrys zonata Devillers-Tersch. & Devillers

= Ophrys fusca =

Species of plant in the family Orchidaceae

Ophrys fusca, commonly known as the sombre bee-orchid or the dark bee-orchid, is a species of orchid native to the Mediterranean from southwestern Europe and northern Africa to western Asia. Most subspecies of the Ophrys fusca are pollinated by males Andrena bees.

== Etymology ==
The genus name Ophrys comes from Greek and means 'eyebrow' - a reference to the hairy fringe of the lip of the flower of many orchids in this genus. The specific epithet fusca means 'dusky' or 'brown', while the subspecies name iricolor refers to the iridescent colouring of the speculum.

== Pouyannian mimicry ==
The somber bee orchid imitates the appearance of a female common sand bee (Andrena flavipes) to attract males for pollination. Further pollinators are the sand bee (Andrena nigroaenea) and the spring silk bee (Colletes cunicularius). This is an example of Pouyannian mimicry

== Subspecies ==
The following subspecies are currently recognized:

- Ophrys fusca subsp. blitopertha (Paulus & Gack) Faurh. & H.A.Pedersen
- Ophrys fusca subsp. cinereophila (Paulus & Gack) Faurh.
- Ophrys fusca subsp. durieui (Rchb.f.) Soó
- Ophrys fusca subsp. funerea (Viv.) Arcang.
- Ophrys fusca subsp. fusca
- Ophrys fusca subsp. iricolor (Desf.) K.Richt.
- Ophrys fusca subsp. pallida (Raf.) E.G.Camus
