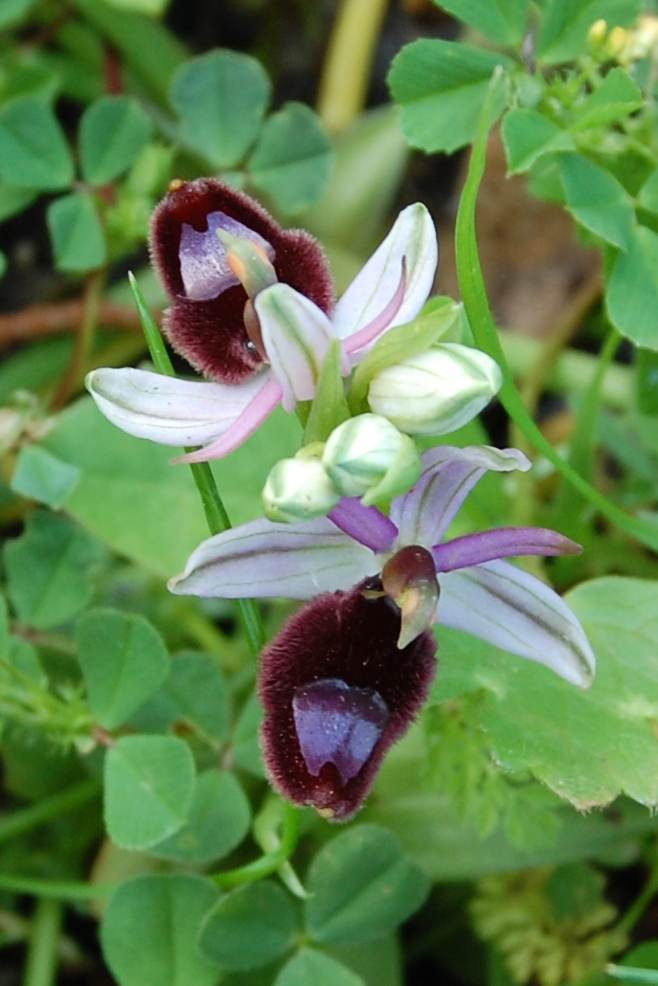
- Flower of Ophrys bertolonii

Conservation status
- Least Concern (IUCN 3.1)

Scientific classification
- Kingdom: Plantae
- Clade: Tracheophytes
- Clade: Angiosperms
- Clade: Monocots
- Order: Asparagales
- Family: Orchidaceae
- Subfamily: Orchidoideae
- Genus: Ophrys
- Species: O. bertolonii

Binomial name
- Ophrys bertolonii Moretti

Synonyms
- Arachnites bertolonii (Moretti) Tod.; Ophrys insectifera subsp. bertolonii (Moretti) Moggr.; Ophrys speculum Bertol.; Arachnites insengae Tod.; Ophrys inzengae (Tod.) Nyman; Ophrys penedensis Kalkhoff; Ophrys dalmatica (Murr) Soó; Ophrys marzensis Soca; Ophrys romolinii Soca

= Ophrys bertolonii =

Bertoloni's bee orchid

Species of orchid

Ophrys bertolonii, commonly known as Bertoloni's bee orchid, is a species of orchid native to the western and central Mediterranean (Spain, France, Corsica, Sardinia, Sicily, mainland Italy, Albania, and Croatia).
