= Tongue orchid =

Tongue orchid or tongue-orchid is a common name for several plants and may refer to:

- Bulbophyllum fletcherianum
- Dendrobium linguiforme
- Serapias, genus of tongue-orchids
  - Serapias lingua, Tongue-orchid
  - Serapias cordigera, Heart-flowered tongue-orchid
  - Serapias neglecta, Scarce tongue-orchid
  - Serapias parviflora, Small-flowered tongue-orchid
- Cryptostylis, genus
  - Cryptostylis leptochila, Small tongue-orchid
  - Cryptostylis subulata, Large tongue-orchid
  - Cryptostylis hunteriana, Leafless tongue-orchid
  - Cryptostylis erecta, Tartan tongue-orchid
