= Natural history of Rhodes =

The natural history of the island of Rhodes is determined by its geographic position, climate and geological diversity. Rhodes is in the Eastern Mediterranean Basin close to the coast of Turkey, and the flora and fauna are a mixture of Mediterranean and Asian elements. Rhodes is in the Eastern Mediterranean conifer-sclerophyllous-broadleaf forests ecoregion.

The habitats are: arable land; perennial crops, orchards and groves, ruderal land; coastline and coastal rocky areas, inland cliffs, sea cliffs and rocky shores: forest, native coniferous woodland; grassland steppes and dry calcareous grassland; shrub land, sclerophyllous scrub, garrigue and maquis shrubland; wetland, rivers and streams.

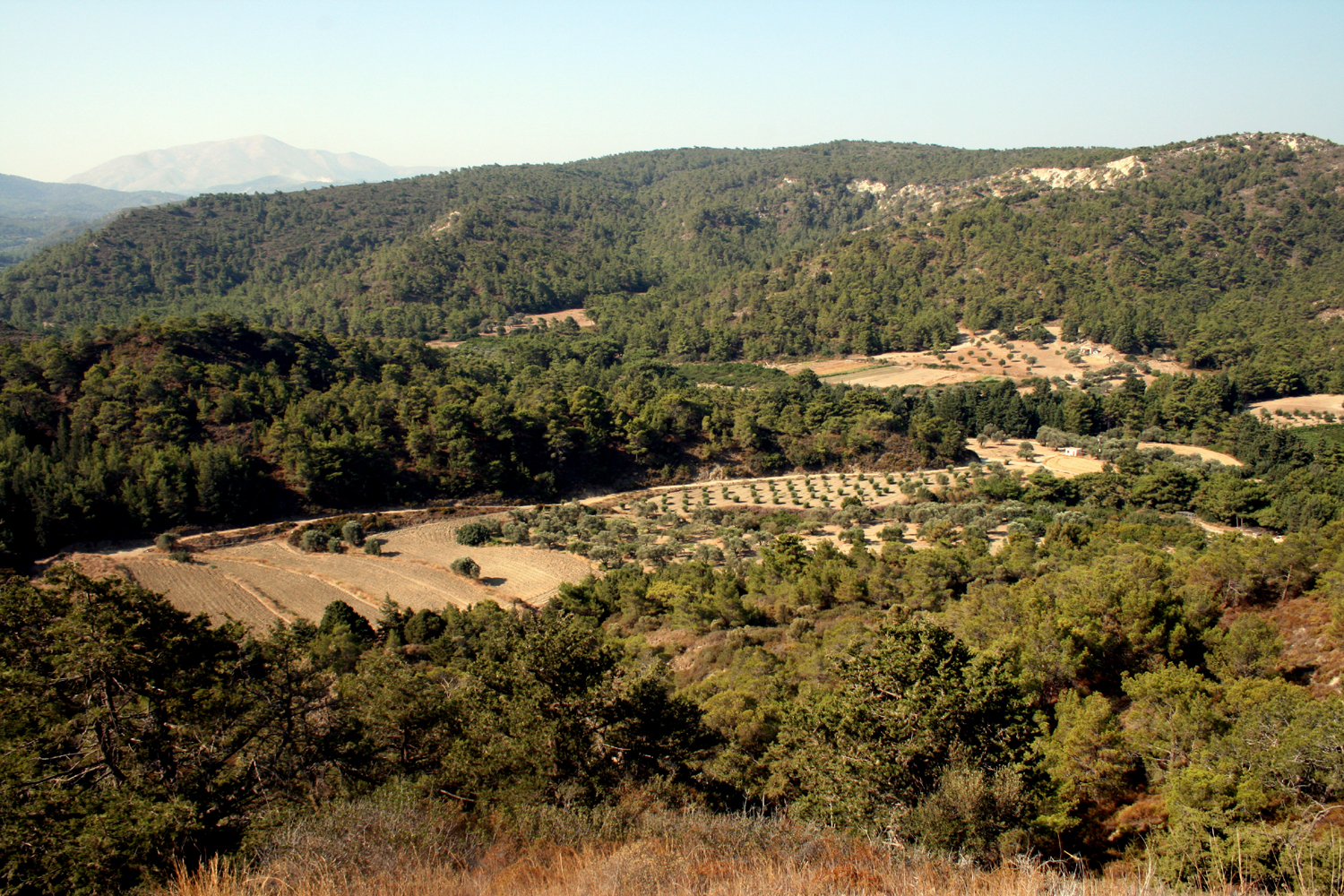
Forest (the dominant trees are Pinus brutia, the Turkish pine and the very closely related Pinus halepensis, the Aleppo pine, and in the valleys olive groves. The "bare" mountain in the background has its own specialist species, Kameiros.

== Flowering plants ==
The flowering plant species of Rhodes number 1,243.

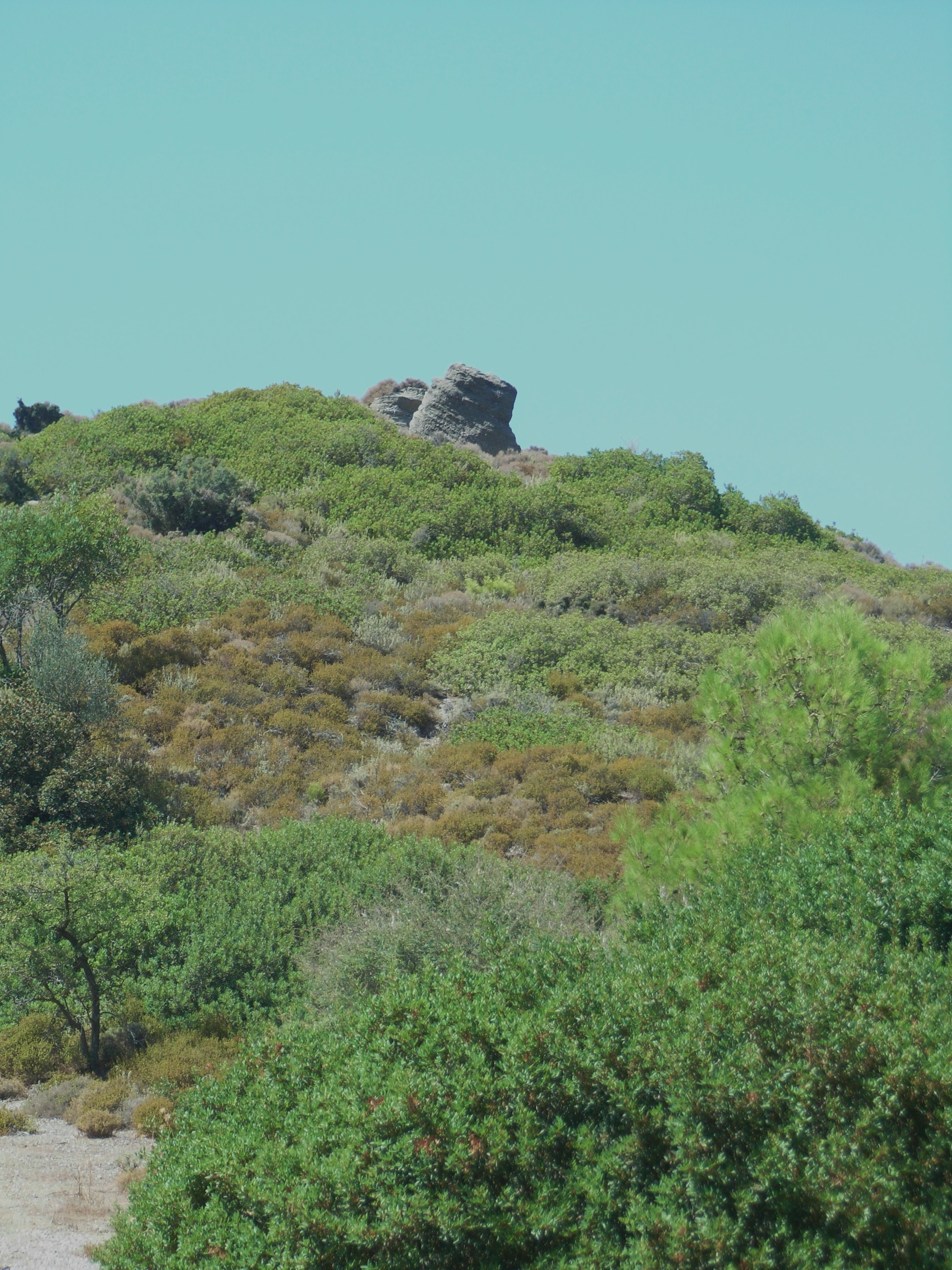
Phrygana in late summer

=== Phrygana or spiny garrigue ===
Phrygana or garrigue is open dwarf scrub dominated by low, often cushion-shaped, spiny shrubs. The phryganic species are high-temperature and drought tolerant, and they grow at low altitudes, usually on poor and rocky limestone and siliceous substrates.

The most common phryganic species on Rhodes are:

- Sarcopoterium spinosum
- Cistus incanus
- Cistus salviifolius
- Phlomis fruticosa
- Salvia triloba
- Quercus coccifera
- Asparagus acutifolius
- Genista acanthoclada
- Euphorbia acanthothamnos
- Pistacia lentiscus

Other species include

- Coridothymus capitatus
- Thymus sp.
- Hypericum empetrifolium
- Salvia triloba
- Erica manipuliflora
- Calicotome villosa
- Ballota acetabulosa
- Asphodelus aestivus

=== Bulbous plants ===
Many bulbous plants on Rhodes flower in the month of October. Species include:

Sternbergia lutea

- Colchicum cupanii
- Cyclamen graecum
- Drimia maritima (late summer)
- Narcissus serotinus.

Notable are:

- Colchicum macrophyllum
- Fritillaria rhodia
- Tulipa saxatilis

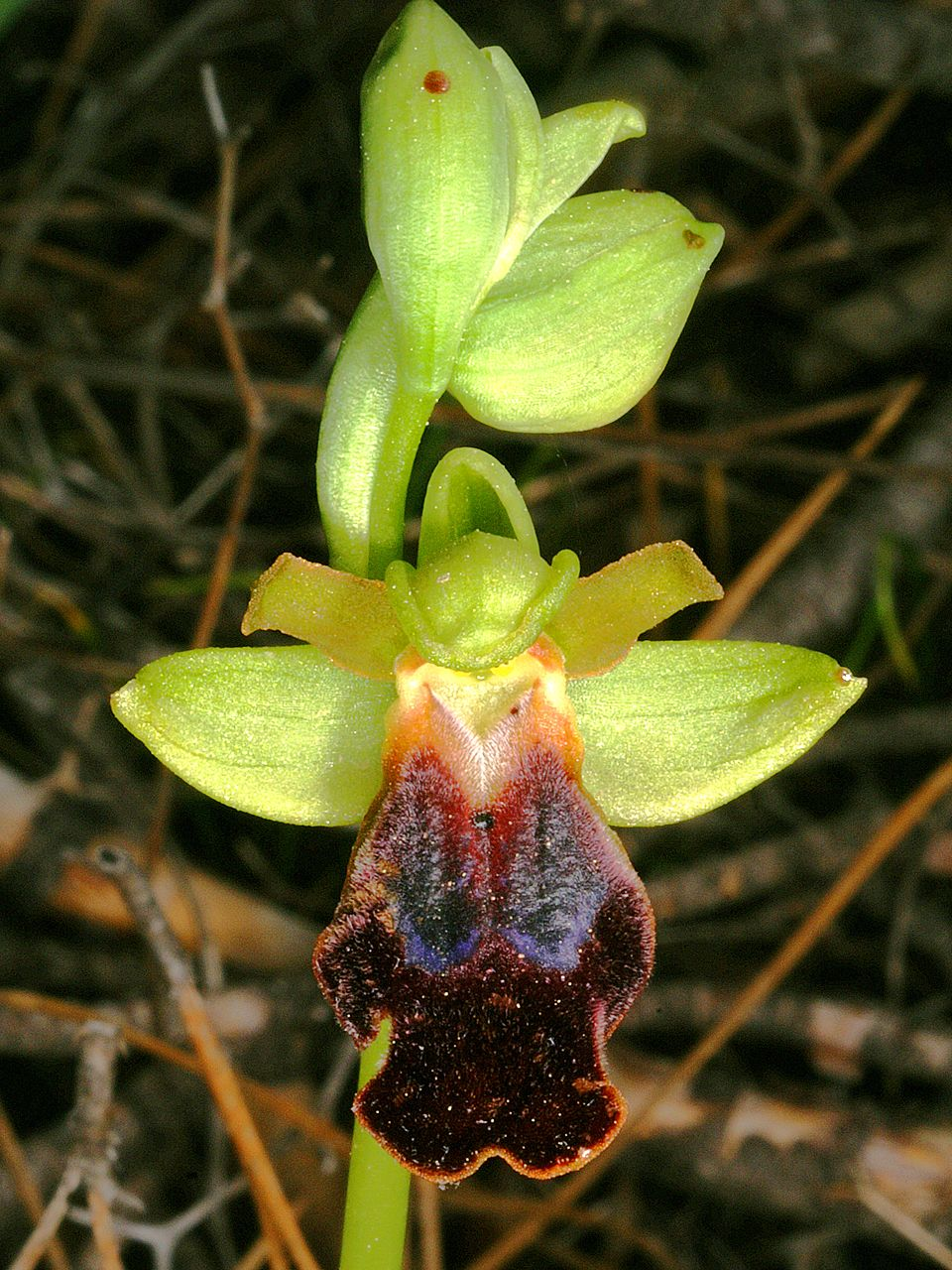
Ophrys attaviria

=== Orchids ===
Rhodes has a high diversity of orchid species, especially in the genus Ophrys:

- Ophrys apifera
- Ophrys bombyliflora
- Ophrys ciliata
- Ophrys regis-ferdinandii
- Ophrys cretica
- Ophrys ferrum-equinum
- Ophrys mammosa
- Ophrys lutea
- Ophrys sicula
- Ophrys reinholdii
- Ophrys tenthredinifera
- Ophrys umbilicata
- Ophrys fusca
- Ophrys omegaifera
- Ophrys iricolor
- Ophrys candica
- Ophrys holosericea
- Ophrys heldreichii
- Ophrys dodekanensis
- Ophrys oestrifera
- Ophrys speculum
- Serapias bergonii
- Serapias carica
- Serapias parviflora
- Himantoglossum comperianum
- Himantoglossum robertianum (= Barlia robertiana)
- Anacamptis collina
- Anacamptis laxiflora
- Anacamptis morio
- Anacamptis papilionacea
- Anacamptis pyramidalis
- Anacamptis sancta

Anacamptis fragrans

- Anacamptis palustris
- Anacamptis coriophora
- Orchis anatolica
- Orchis anthropophora
- Orchis italica
- Orchis provincialis
- Orchis punctulata
- Orchis simia
- Orchis lactea
- Neotinea intacta
- Neotinea lactea
- Dactylorhiza romana
- Spiranthes spiralis
- Limodorum abortivum
- Cephalanthera epipactoides
- Cephalanthera longifolia
- Neotinea maculata

=== Other plants ===
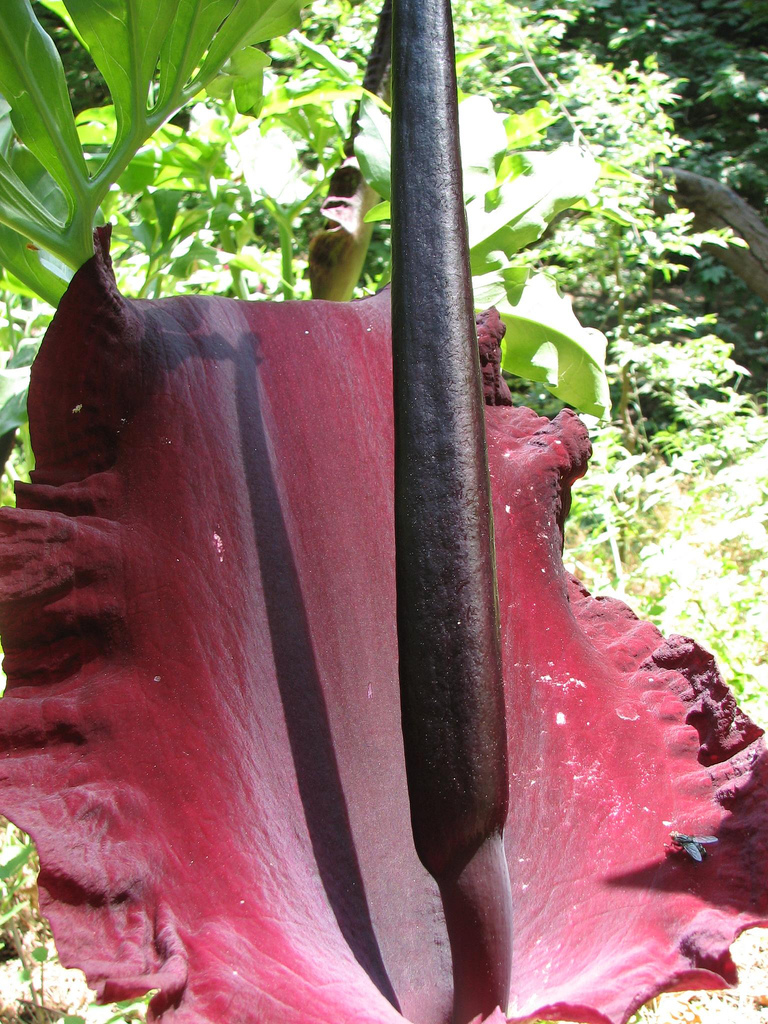
Dracunculus vulgaris

Among the Mediterranean endemic species prominent in the Rhodes vegetation are:

- Aleppo pine
- stone pine
- Mediterranean cypress
- bay laurel
- Oriental sweetgum
- holm oak
- kermes oak
- strawberry tree
- Greek strawberry tree
- mastic
- terebinth
- common myrtle
- oleander
- Acanthus mollis
- Vitex agnus-castus
- Valerianella coronata

Nearly endemic to the Mediterranean genera found on Rhodes are:

- Aubrieta
- Sesamoides
- Cynara
- Dracunculus
- Arisarum
- Biarum

More widespread in South-east Europe and Asia Minor plants include

- Ranunculus asiaticus
- Tamarix parviflora
- Petrorhagia dubia
- Heliotropium europaeum
- Centranthus calcitrapae and Globularia alypum

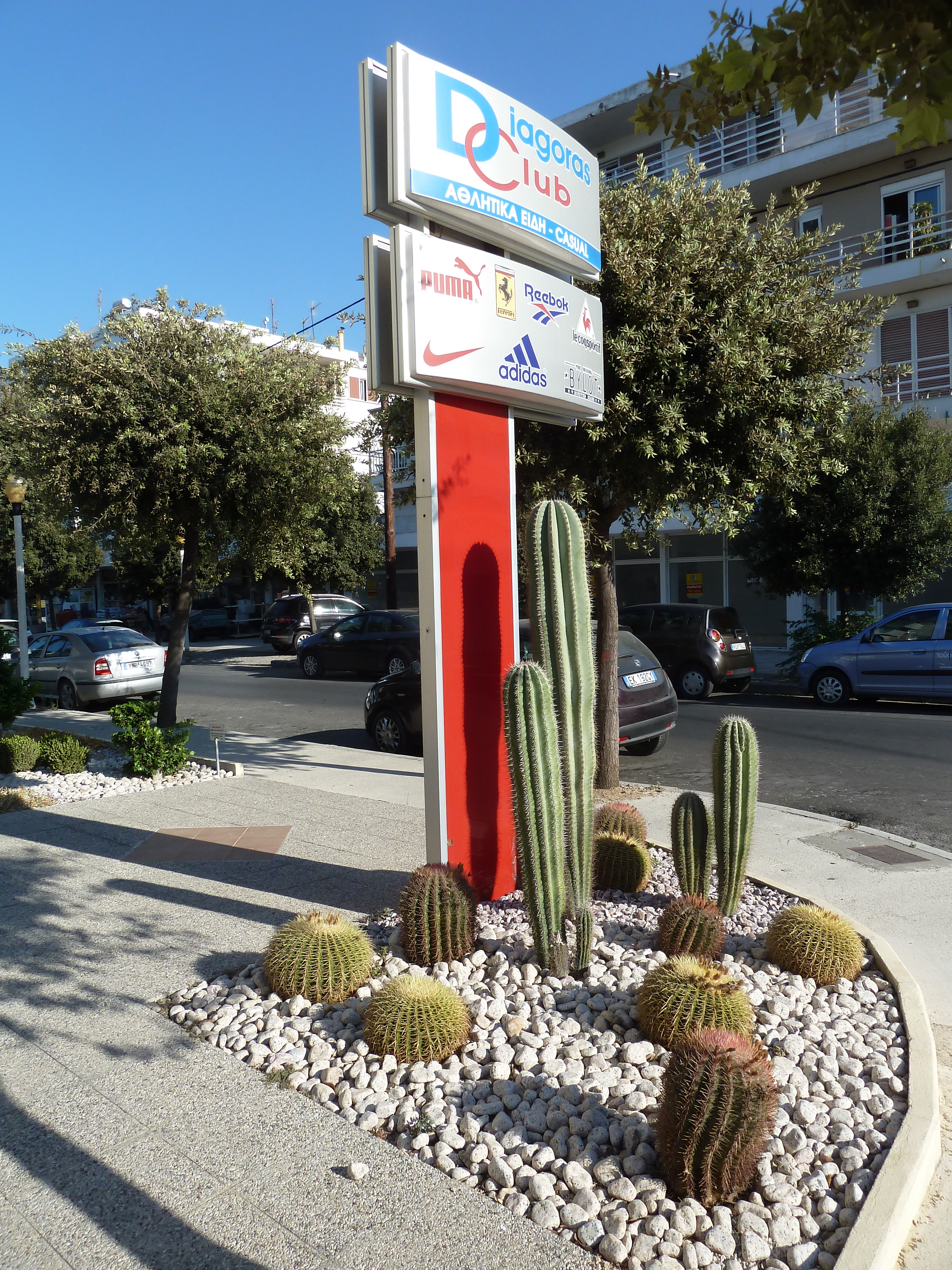
Hot arid climate cacti in Rhodes town

=== Widely-grown introduced plants ===
Widely introduced plants include:

- Bougainvillea
- Acacia
- Agave
- Artemisia
- Calendula
- Clematis
- Eucalyptus
- Fuchsia
- Hydrangea
- Impatiens
- Jacaranda
- Jasmine
- Magnolia
- Melissa
- Pelargonium
- Salvia

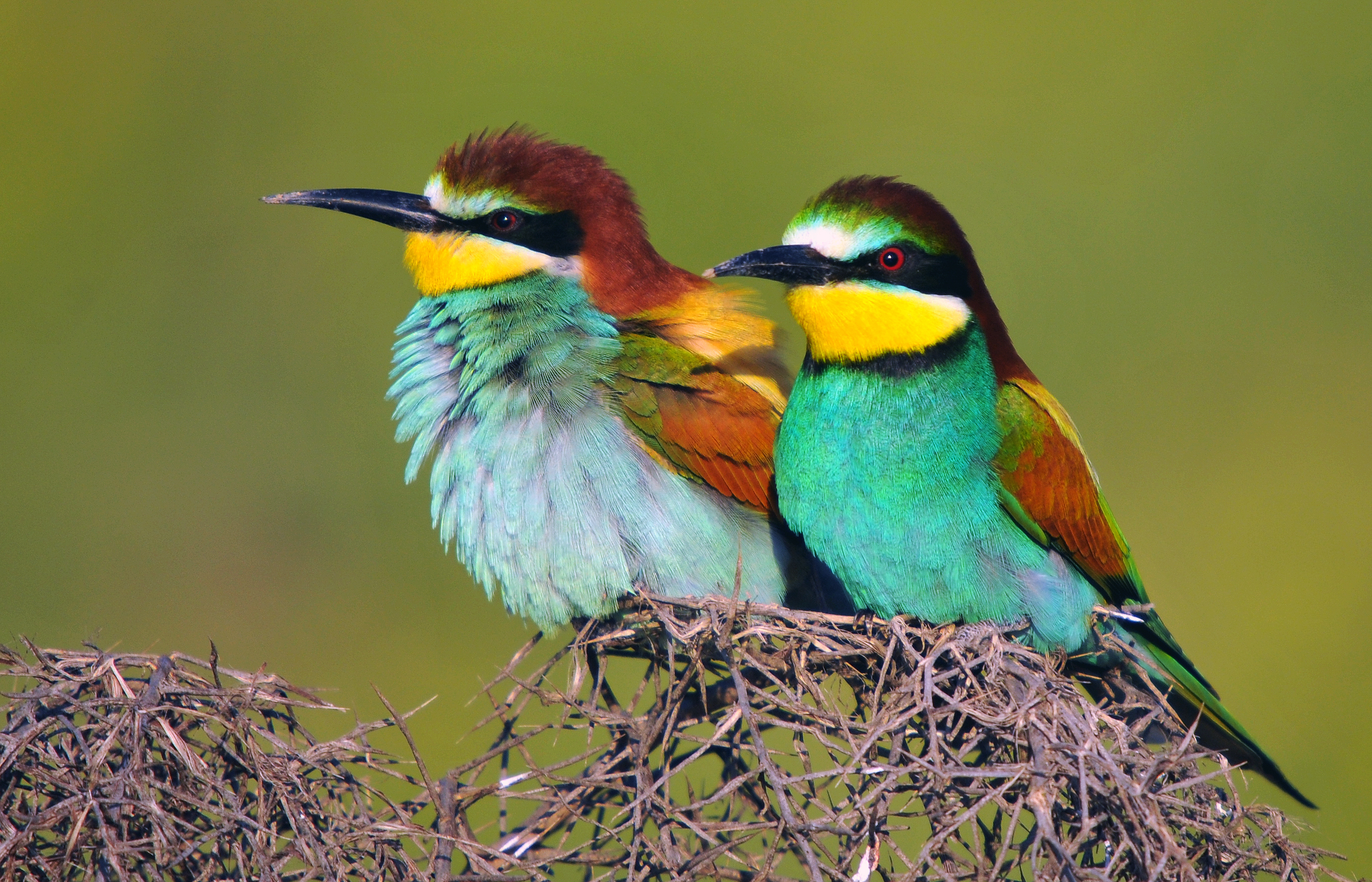
Bee-eaters

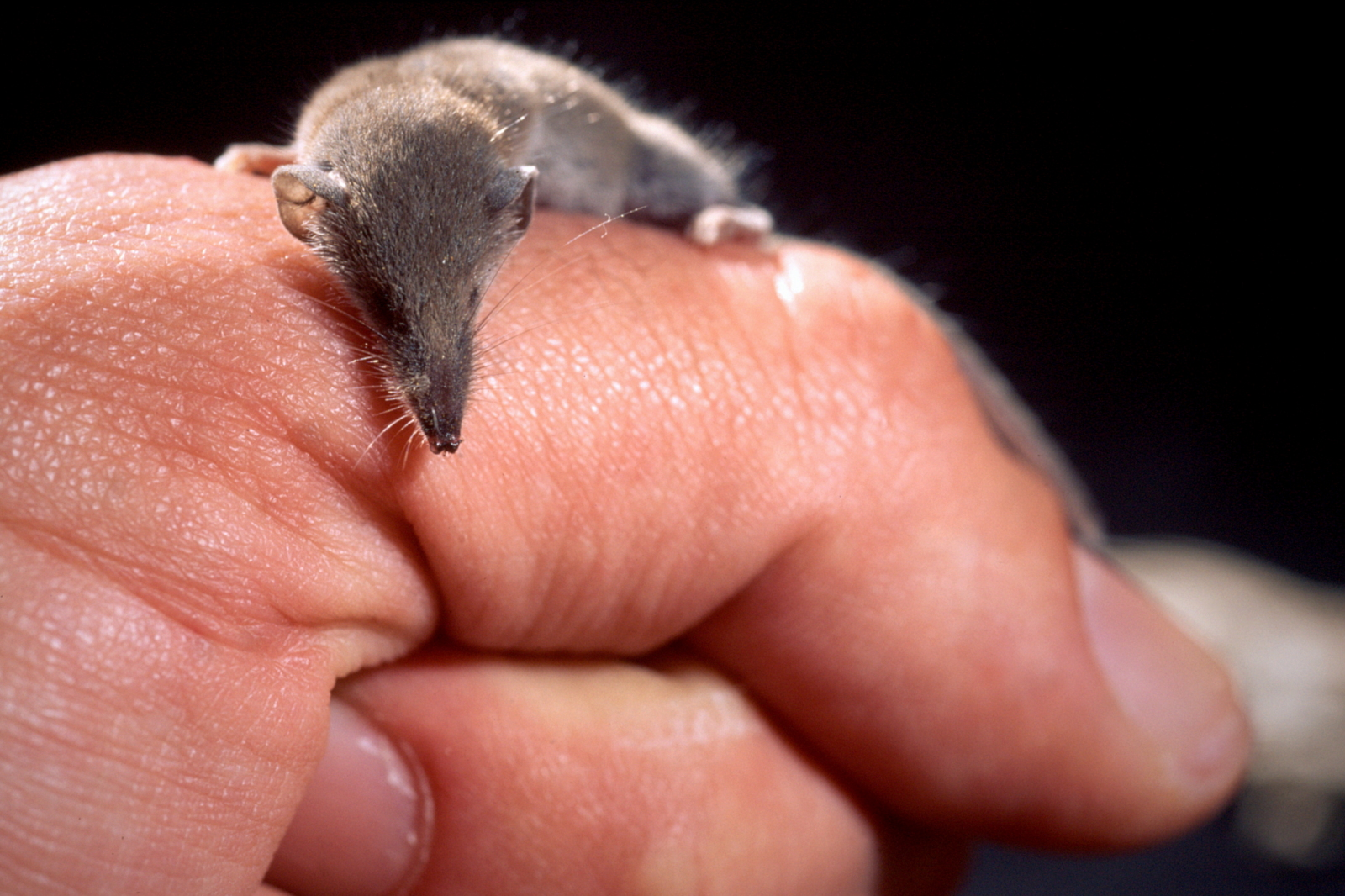
The tiny Etruscan shrew. This is an adult.

== Birds ==
257 bird species are recorded from Rhodes, many are passage migrants. 80 are breeding species.

Breeding species include:

- Alectoris chukar
- Burhinus oedicnemus
- Otus scops
- Apus melba
- Apus pallidus
- Merops apiaster
- Upupa epops
- Calandrella brachydactyla
- Hirundo daurica
- Anthus campestris
- Cercotrichas galactotes
- Oenanthe hispanica
- Gulosus aristotelis
- Ixobrychus minutus
- Buteo rufinus
- Hieraaetus fasciatus
- Circaetus gallicus
- Falco naumanni
- Falco eleonorae
- Falco peregrinus
- Falco biarmicus
- Aquila chrysaetos
- Clamator glandarius
- Melanocorypha calandra
- Acrocephalus melanopogon
- Phylloscopus bonelli
- Sitta neumayer
- Oriolus oriolus
- Corvus corax
- Emberiza hortulana
- Emberiza caesia
- Emberiza melanocephala
- Lanius collurio
- Hippolais olivetorum
- Sylvia ruppeli
- Saxicola rubetra

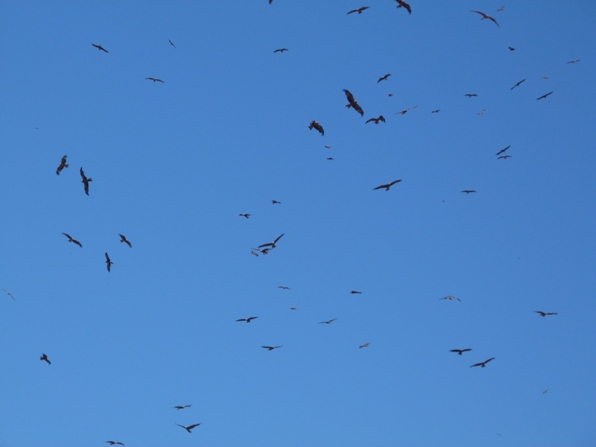
Migrating black kites

Passage migrants include:

Nycticorax nycticorax

- Ardeola ralloides
- Ardea purpurea
- Plegadis falcinellus
- Pandion haliaetus
- Falco vespertinus
- Milvus migrans
- Circus pygargus
- Hieraaetus pennatus
- Himantopus himantopus
- Glareola pratincola
- Calidris temminckii
- Tringa stagnatilis
- Larus audouinii
- Gelochelidon nilotica
- Chlidonias leucopterus
- Chlidonias hybridus
- Coracias garrulus
- Anthus cervinus
- Plegadis falcinellus
- Oenanthe isabellina
- Oenanthe pleschanka

Vagrant birds (many from nearby Turkey) include Circus macrourus, Charadrius leschenaultii, Apus affinis, Luscinia luscinia, Merops persicus, Ficedula semitorquata, Oenanthe cypriaca, Sturnus roseus, Hoplopterus spinosus, Emberiza rustica, Chettusia gregaria, Bubulcus ibis, Anthropoides virgo, Passer moabiticus and very many others.

winter visitors on Rhodes include: Melanocorypha calandra and Acrocephalus melanopogon.

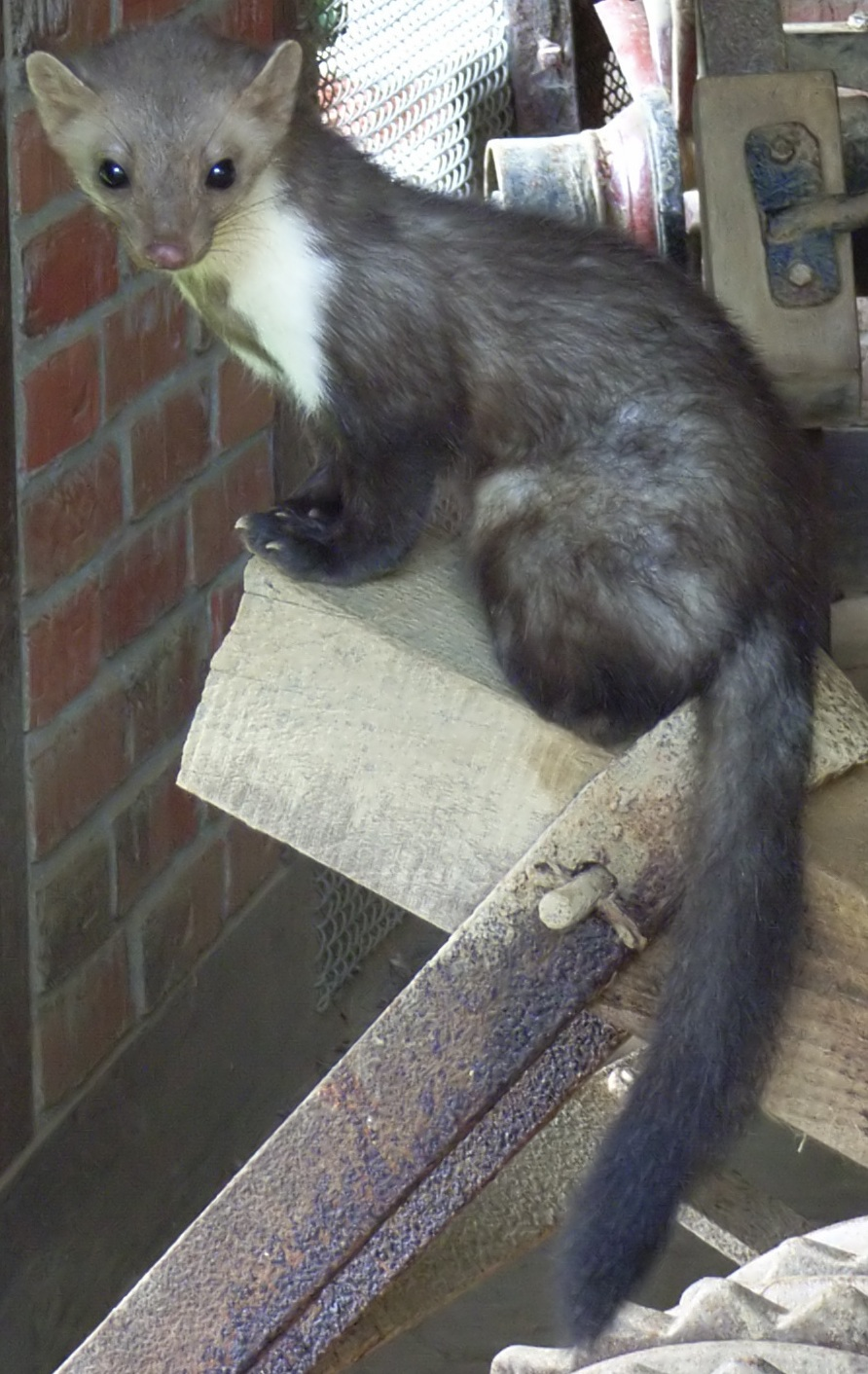
Beech marten

== Mammals ==
There are 33 species: Cervidae Dama dama; Canidae Vulpes vulpes; Erinaceidae Erinaceus concolor, Erinaceus roumanicus; Leporidae Lepus europaeus, Oryctolagus cuniculus; Molossidae Tadarida teniotis; Muridae Apodemus flavicollis, Apodemus mystacinus, Apodemus sylvaticus, Mus domesticus, Rattus rattus; Mustelidae Martes foina, Meles meles; Phocidae Monachus monachus; Rhinolophidae Rhinolophus blasii, Rhinolophus euryale, Rhinolophus ferrumequinum, Rhinolophus hipposideros; Soricidae Crocidura suaveolens, Suncus etruscus; Vespertilionidae Eptesicus bottae, Hypsugo savii, Miniopterus schreibersii, Myotis blythii, Myotis emarginatus, Myotis myotis, Pipistrellus kuhlii, Pipistrellus pipistrellus, Plecotus austriacus.

Fossils found on the island indicate that the species was inhabited by a dwarf elephant species of the genus Palaeoloxodon during the Late Pleistocene.

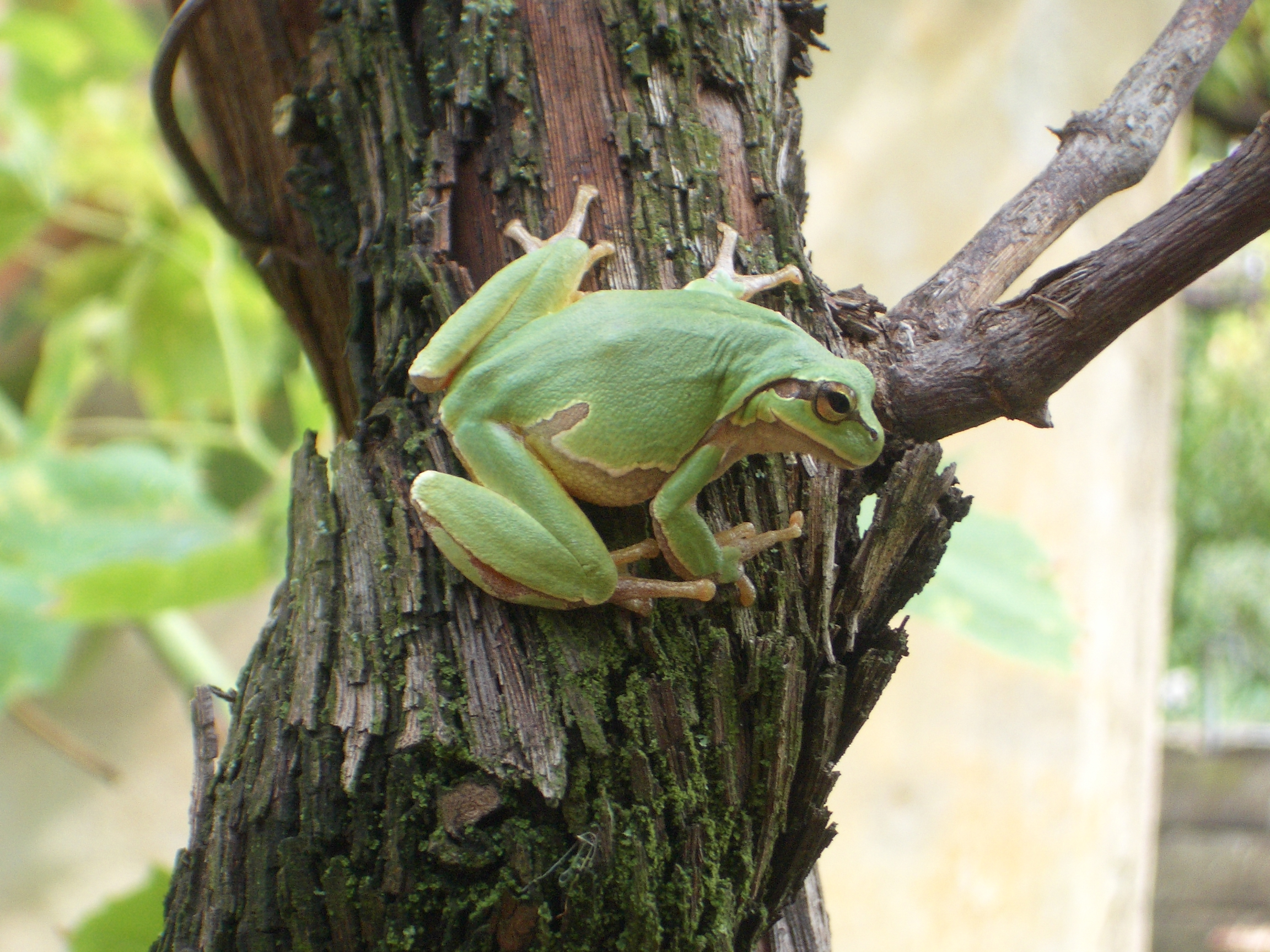
European tree frog

== Amphibia ==
Rhodes has 3 species: Bufo viridis, Hyla orientalis and Rana cerigensis.

== Reptiles ==
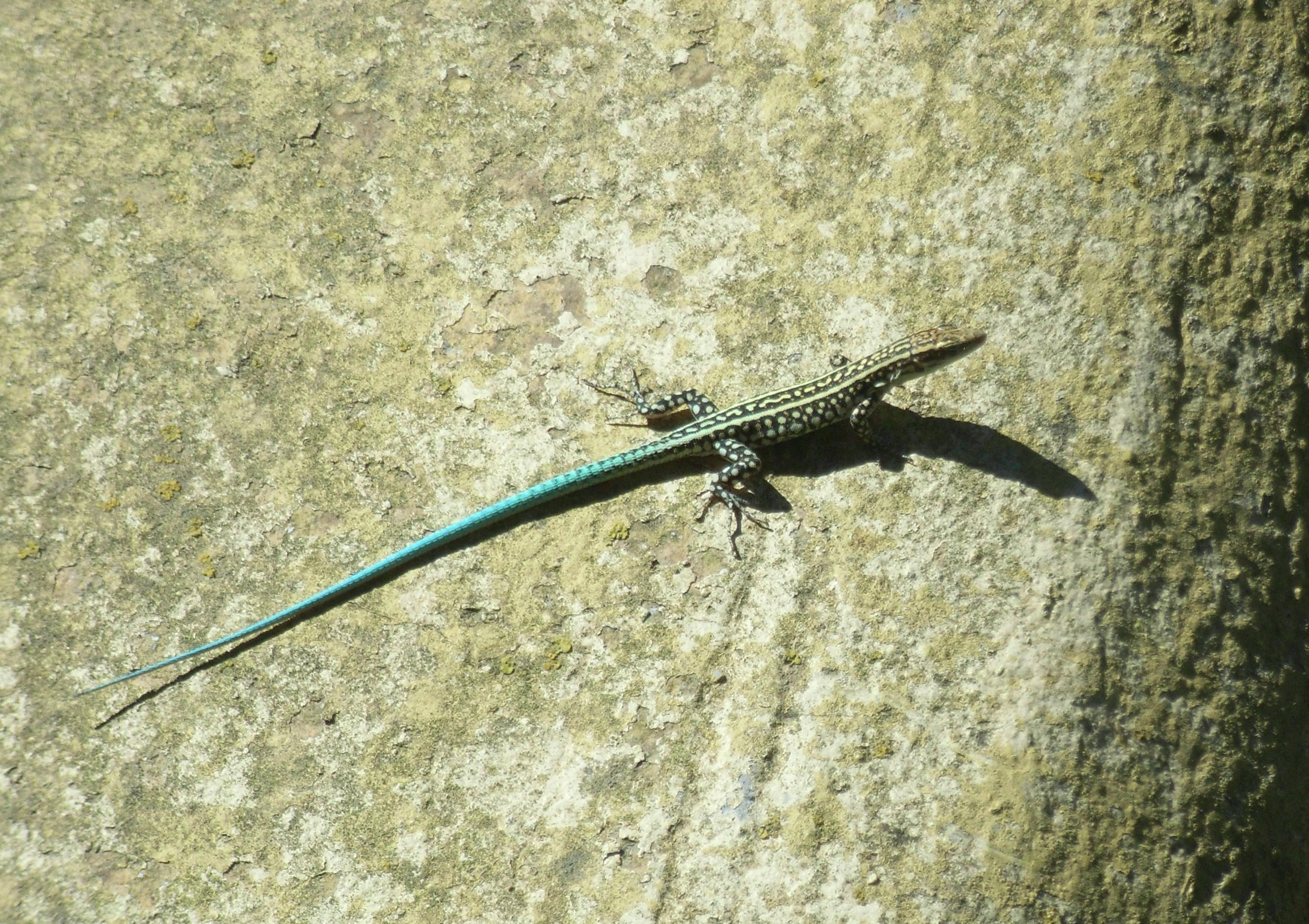
Anatololacerta oertzeni

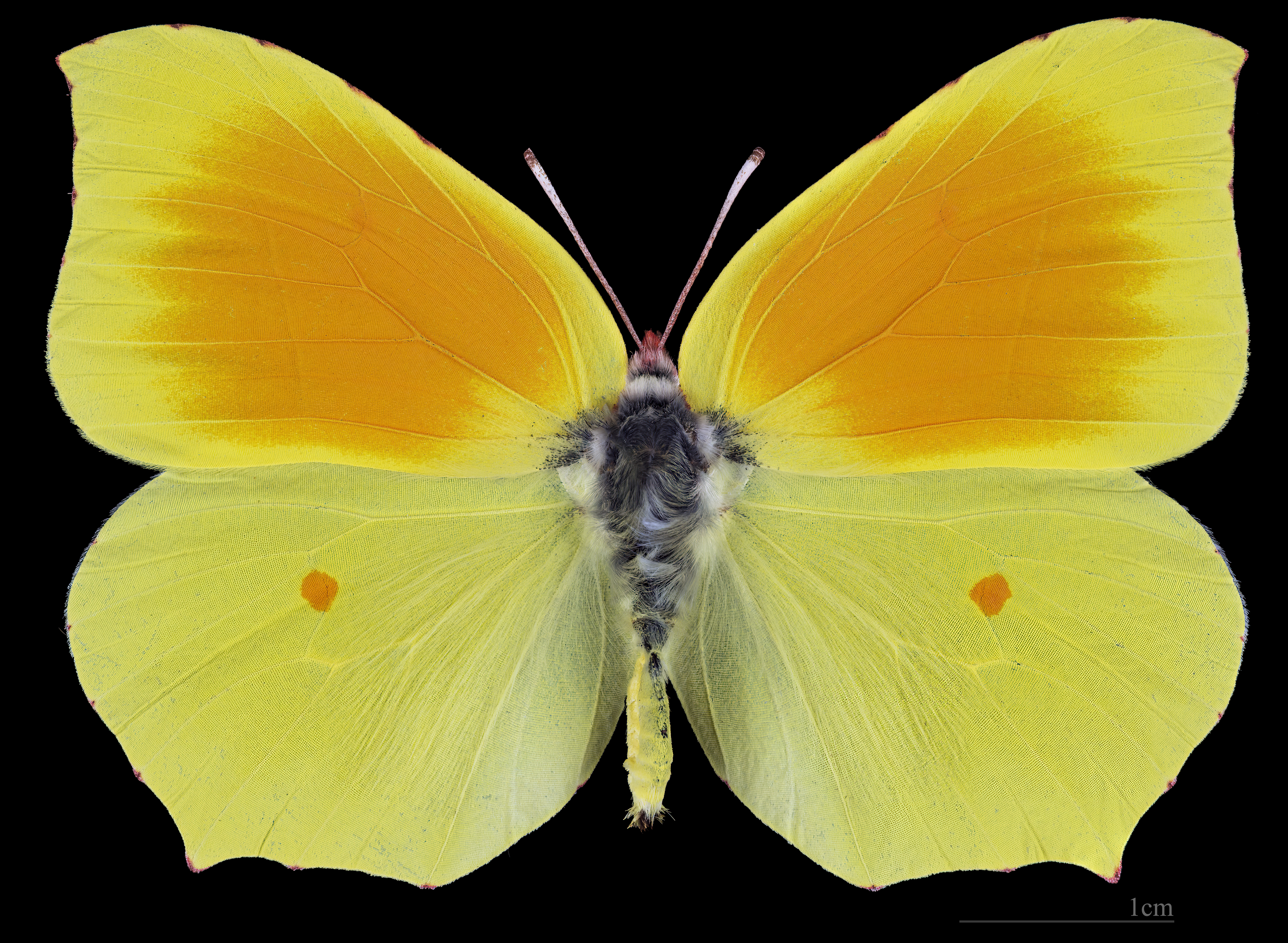
Cleopatra butterfly

There are for certain 23 reptile species found on Rhodes. These are: Amphisbaenidae, Blanus strauchi; Cheloniidae, Caretta caretta; Dermochelyidae, Dermochelys coriacea; Geoemydidae Mauremys rivulata; Colubridae, Platyceps najadum, Dolichophis jugularis, Hemorrhois nummifer, Zamenis situla, Natrix natrix, Natrix tessellata, Telescopus fallax; Lacertidae, Anatololacerta pelasgiana, Ophisops elegans, Lacerta diplochondrodes; Scincidae, Ablepharus kitaibelii, Chalcides ocellatus, Heremites auratus; Typhlopidae, Xerotyphlops vermicularis; Agamidae, Laudakia stellio; Phyllodactylidae, Tarentola mauritanica; Gekkonidae, Hemidactylus turcicus, Mediodactylus oertzeni and also the invasive Trachemys scripta.

Species uncertainly recorded include a further 7: Malpolon insignitus, Eryx jaculus, Eirenis modestus, Vipera xanthina, Chamaeleo chamaeleon, Testudo graeca and Testudo hermanni.

== Fish ==
See List of fish of the Mediterranean Sea. Squalius ghigii is endemic to Rhodes.

== Insects ==
2,652 insect species/subspecies are recorded from Rhodes. Commonly seen insects in Rhodes are the sail swallowtail, the scarlet dragonfly, Cleopatra butterfly, European praying mantis, cicada, glow-worm, hummingbird hawk-moth, firebug, field cricket, European tree cricket, European hornet, cuckoo wasp, carpenter bee and the rose chafer.

== Land and freshwater mollusca ==
178 land and freshwater mollusca species/subspecies are recorded from Rhodes.

== Other terrestrial invertebrates ==
The freshwater crab Potamon rhodium is found on Rhodes. It is common at Petaloudes.

== Marine fauna ==
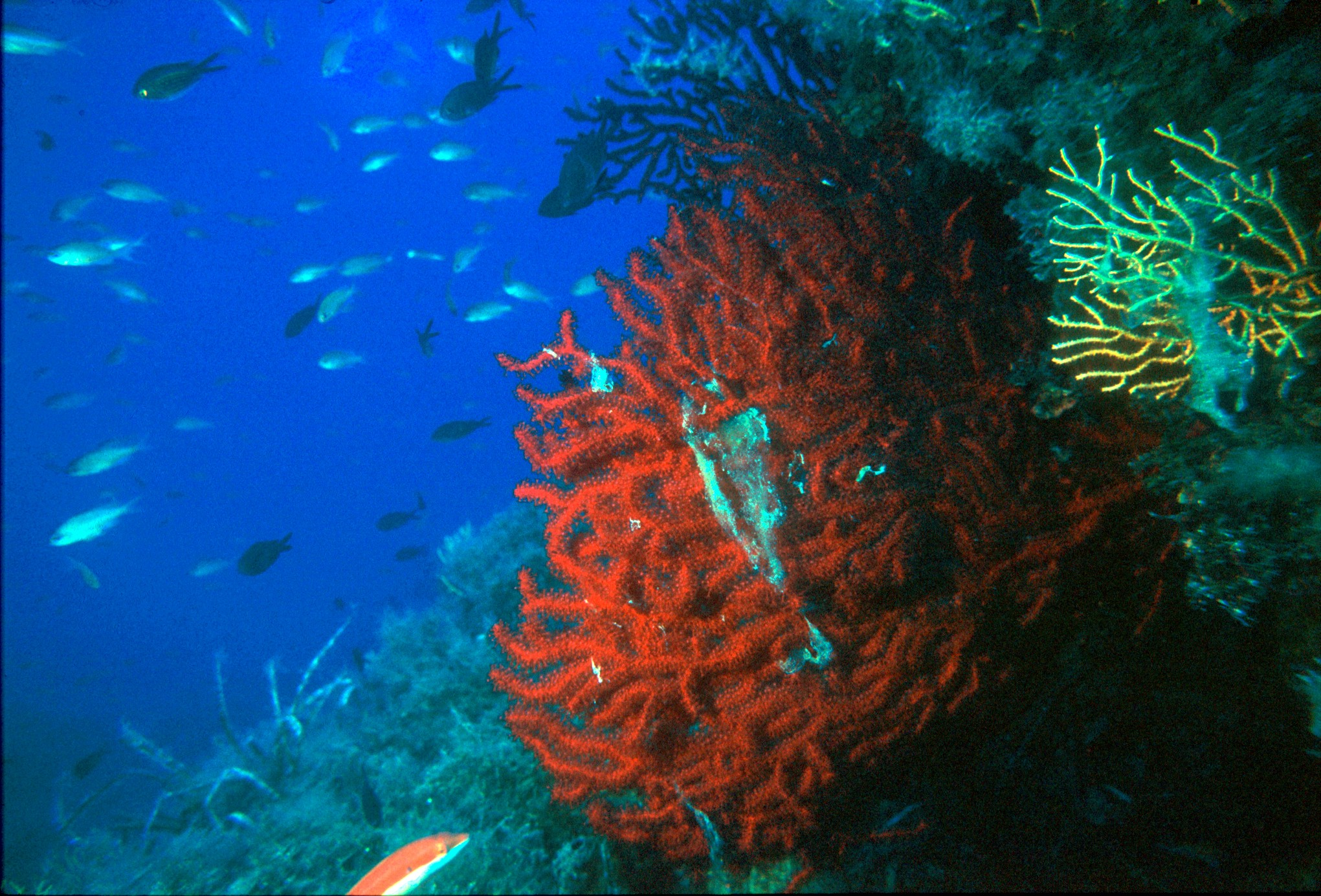
Paramuricea clavata reef

Characteristic habitat types of the Rhodes Mediterranean/Aegean coastal zone, are the Cystoseira biocenosis and the Posidonia oceanica seagrass beds, Lithophyllum lichenoides communities form coralligenous reefs which are a spectacular sight; the coralline alga is covered with large gorgonian fans, coral, and a diverse array of often colourful invertebrate organisms and hundreds of species of fish.

These communities host sponges (Porifera), sea anemones, jellyfish (Cnidaria), sea mats and hornwrack (Bryozoa), segmented worms (Annelida) snails, bivalves, squids and octopuses (Mollusca), starfishes and sea urchins (Echinodermata), crabs, lobsters and shrimps (Arthropoda) and little known groups such as Echiura, Priapulida, Sipuncula, Brachiopoda, Pogonophora, Phoronida and Hemichordata.

Amongst the thousand or so species of invertebrates found in the Rhodes Mediterranean/Aegean coastal zone marine environment are mantis shrimps, Mediterranean slipper lobsters, octopus, cuttlefish, scribbled nudibranch, Hypselodoris picta, tasselled nudibranch, precious coral, zigzag coral, purple sail, Mediterranean jellyfish, spiny spider crab, circular crab, broad-clawed porcelain crab, noble pen shell, pilgrim's scallop, ragged sea hare, violet sea hare, Portuguese man o' war, black sea urchin, purple sea-urchin, long-spine slate pen sea urchin, Mediterranean starfish, sea mouse, Barbatia barbata and Parazoanthus axinellae.

== Museums ==
There is a marine natural history display at the Aquarium of Rhodes together with a display of living Mediterranean fish and other marine creatures. A second natural history display at Petaloudes is devoted to the mammals, birds, reptiles, insects, plants and geology of Rhodes. A more specialised museum devoted to bee keeping is close to Rhodes city).

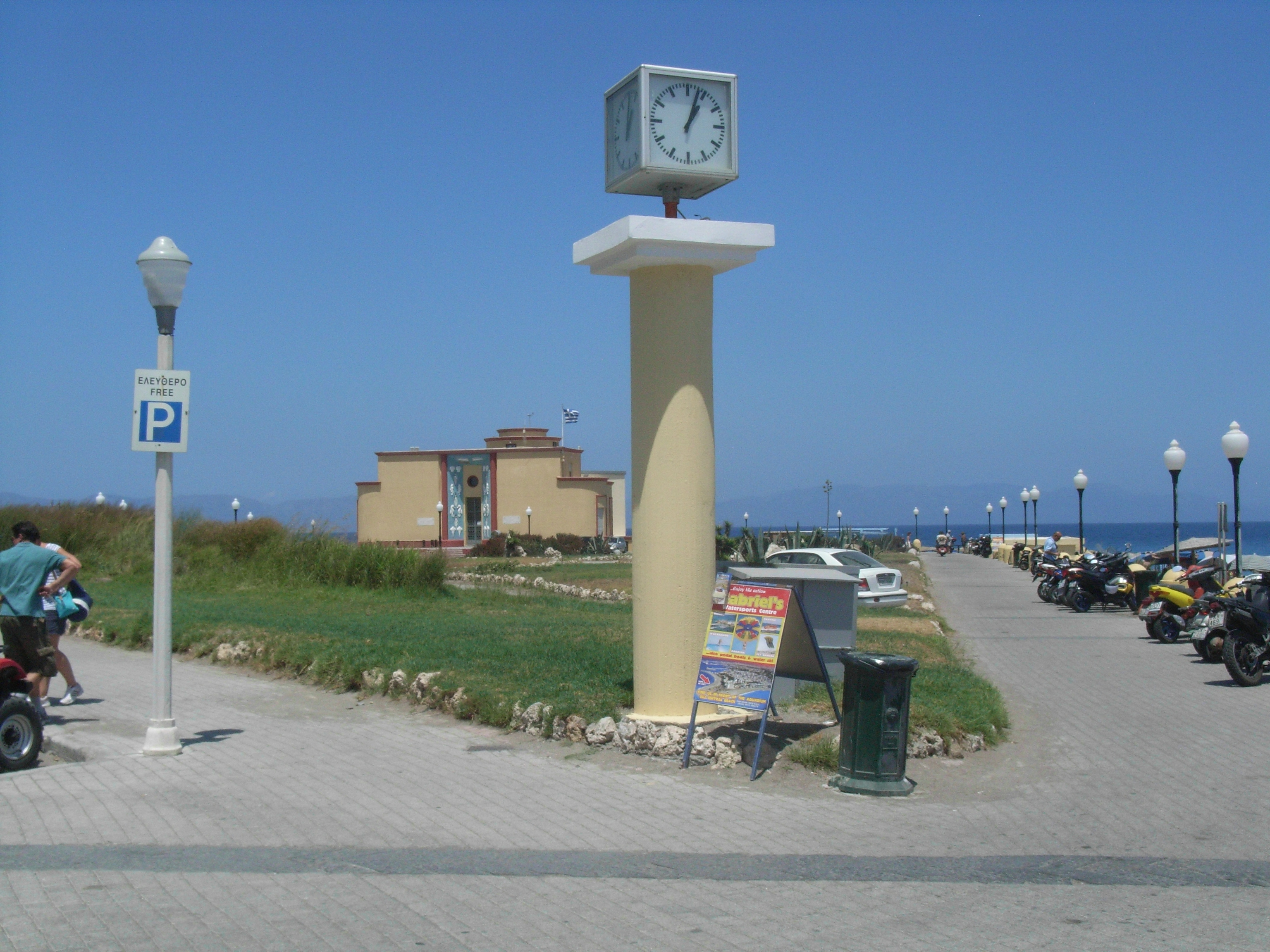
Rhodes Aquarium

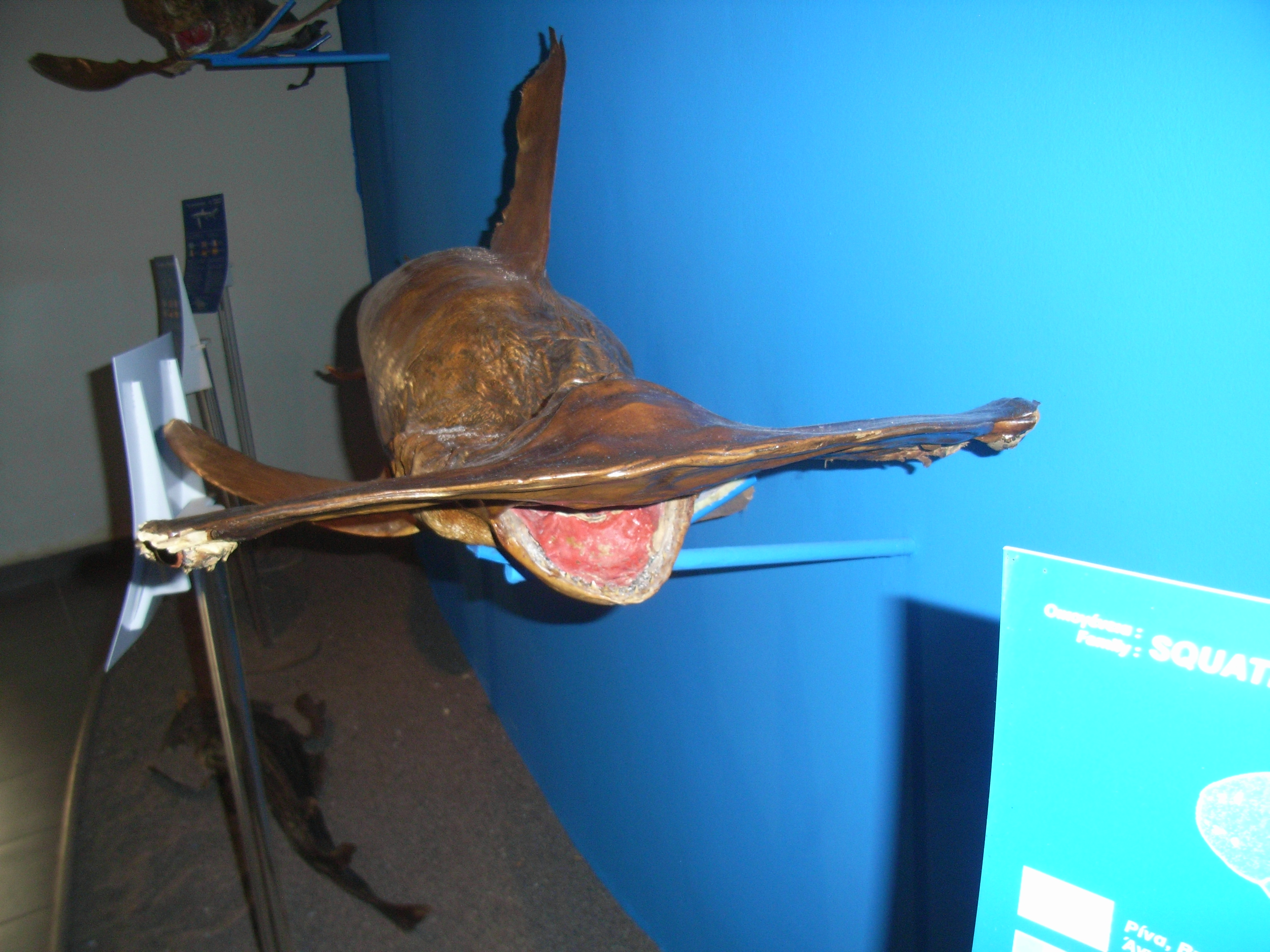
Museum of Rhodes Aquarium, smooth hammerhead shark

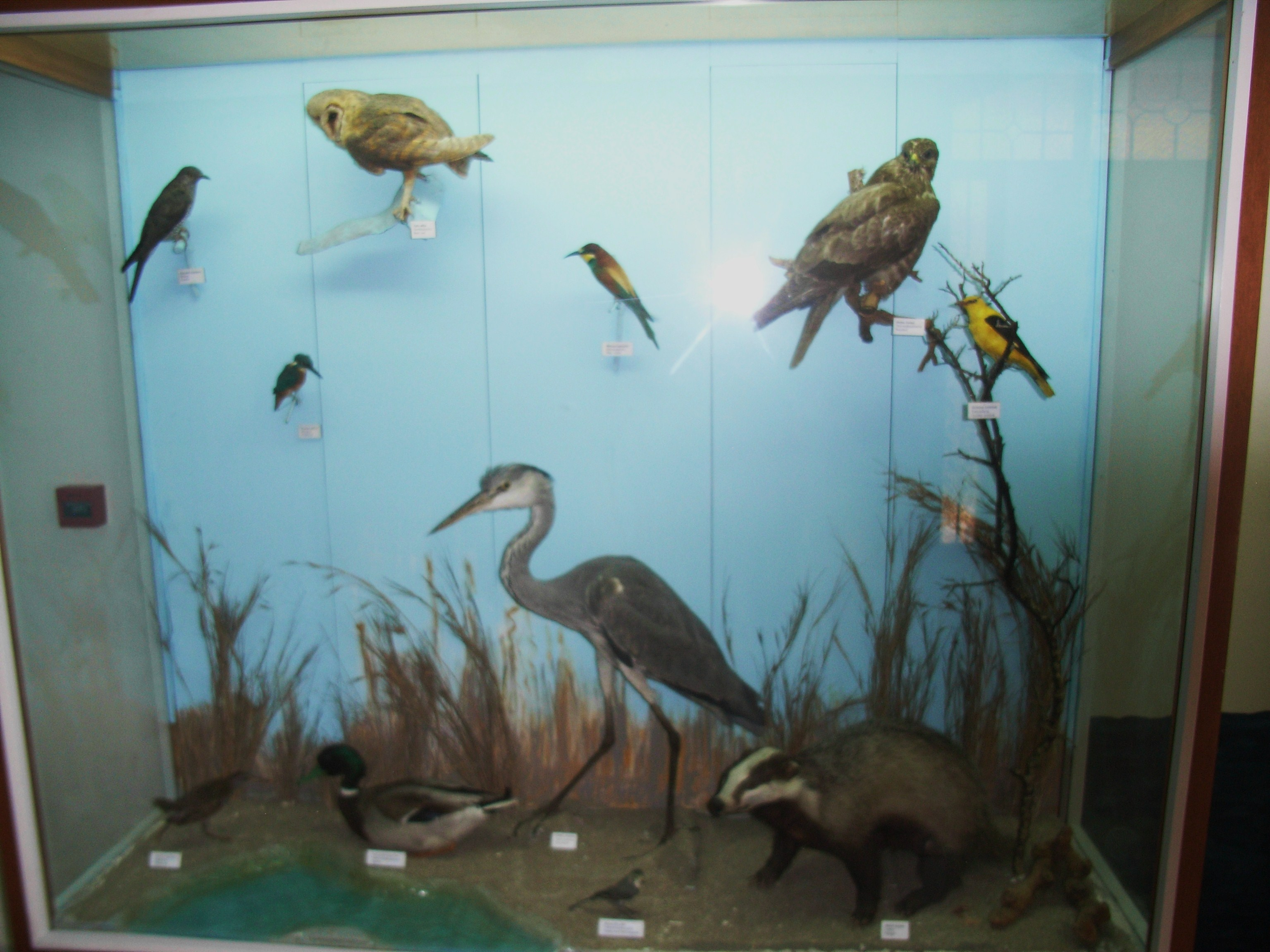
Nature Museum Petaloudes. A display case.

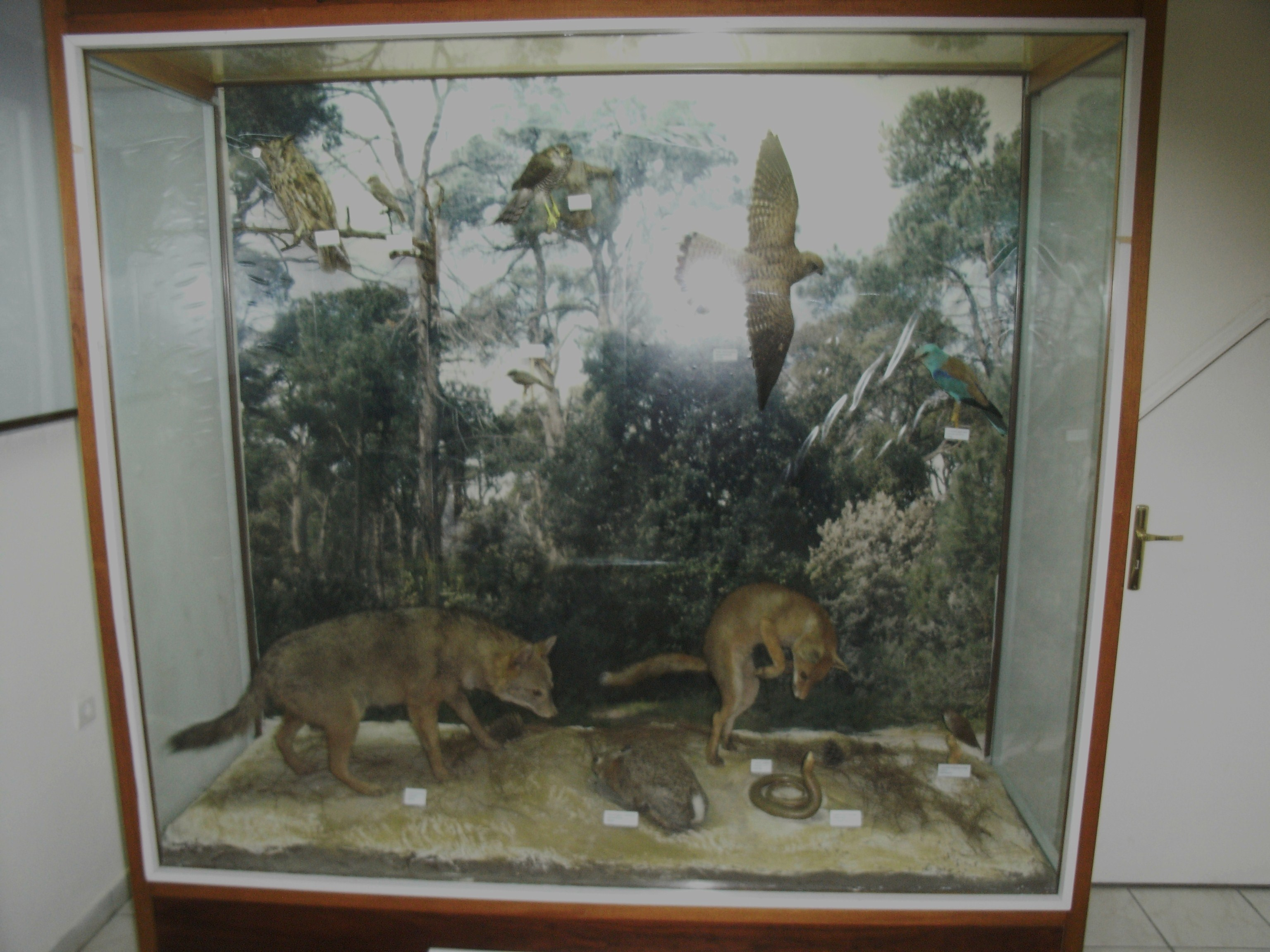
A display case.

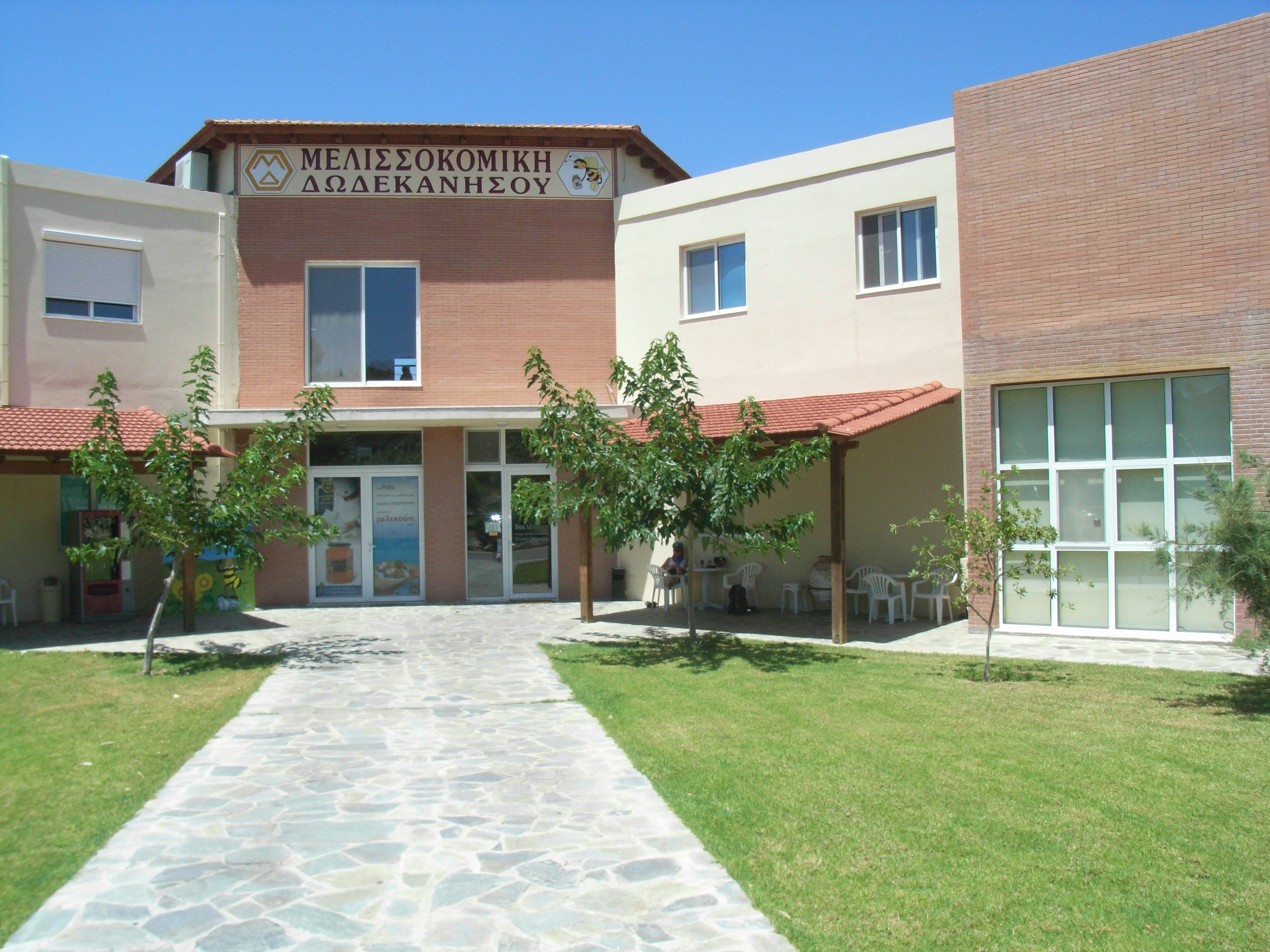
Bee Museum of Rhodes.

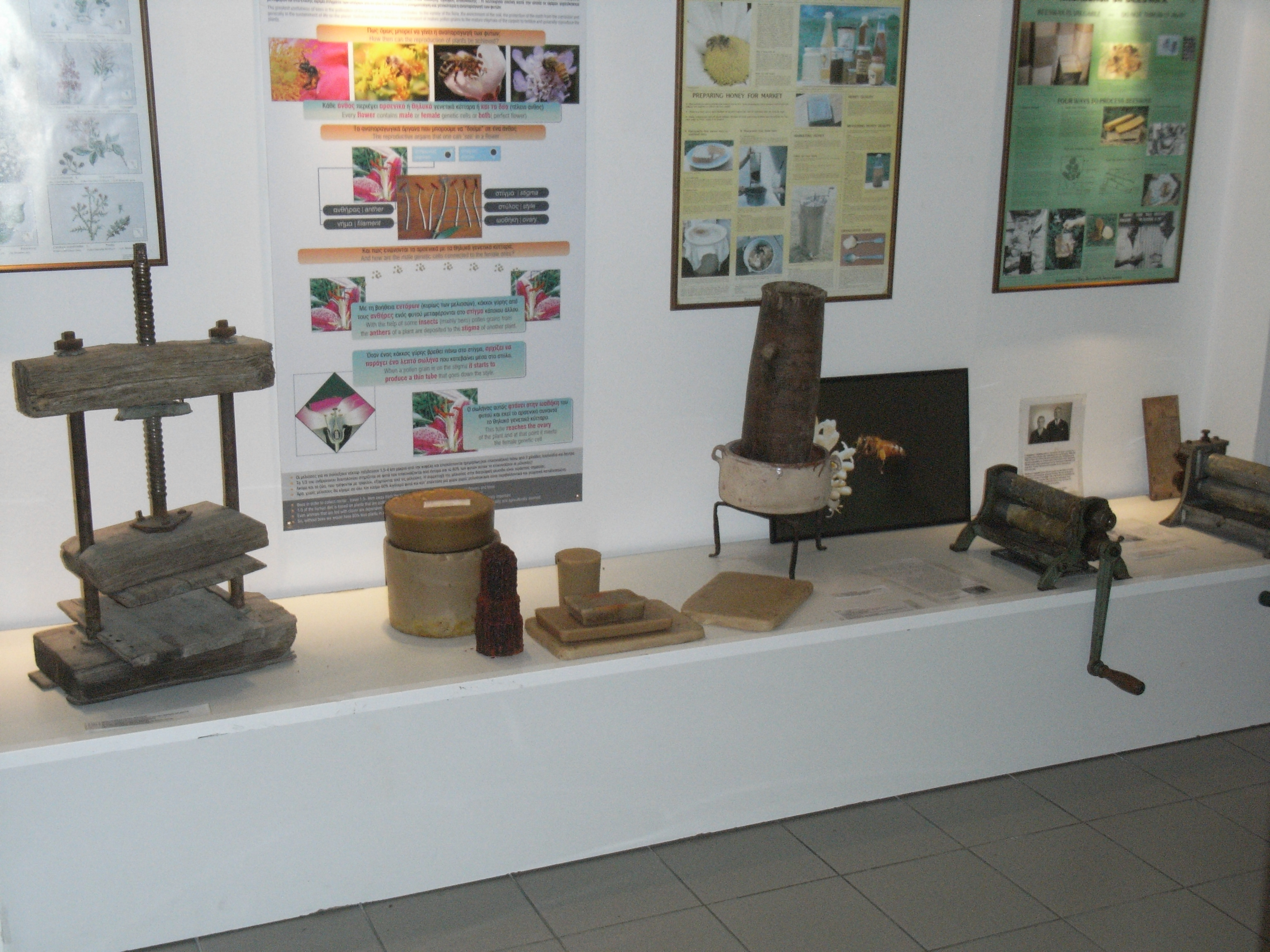
Bee Museum. A small section of the extensive displays.

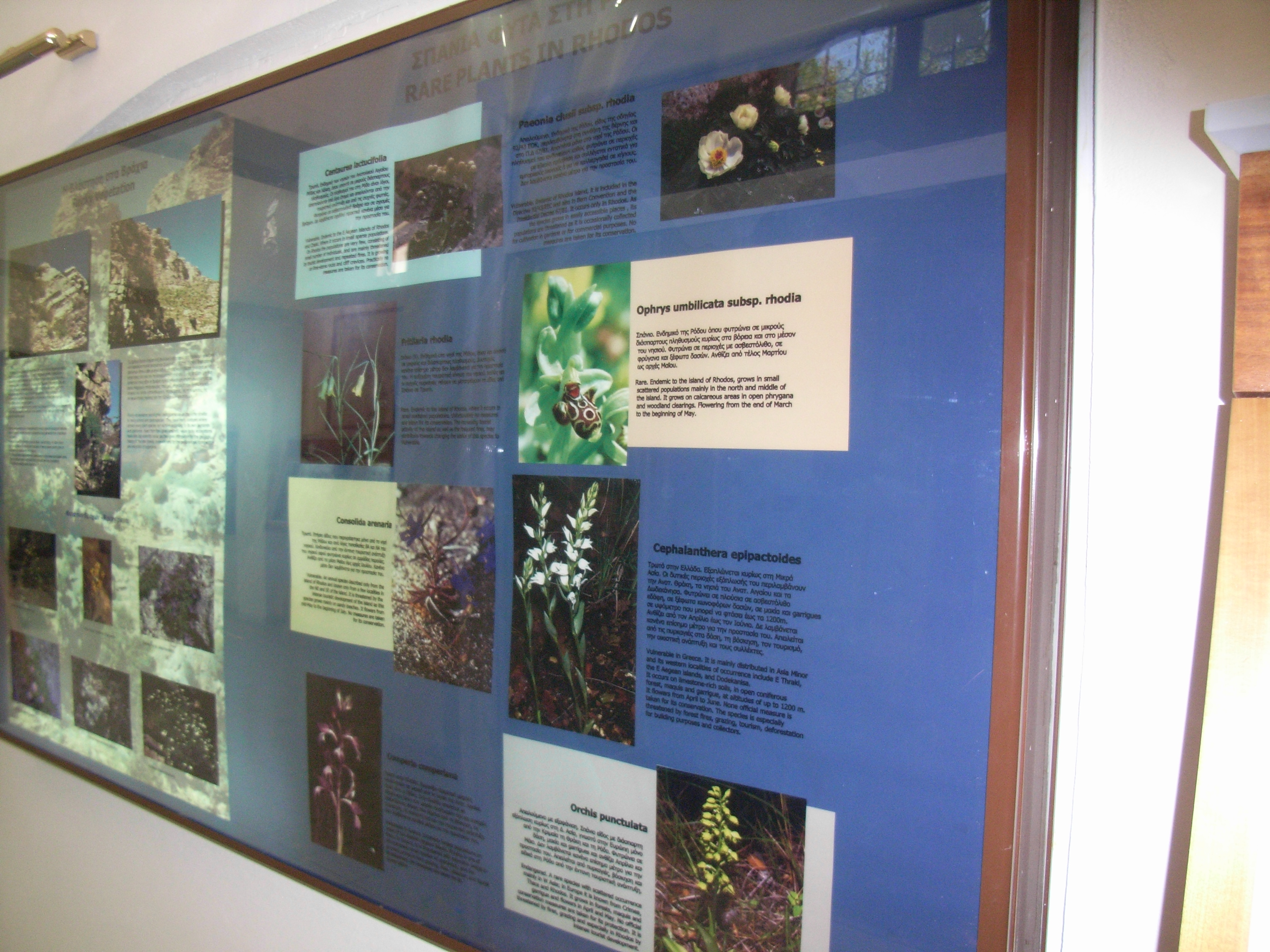
Educational display at Nature Museum Petaloudes concerning threatened rare plants.

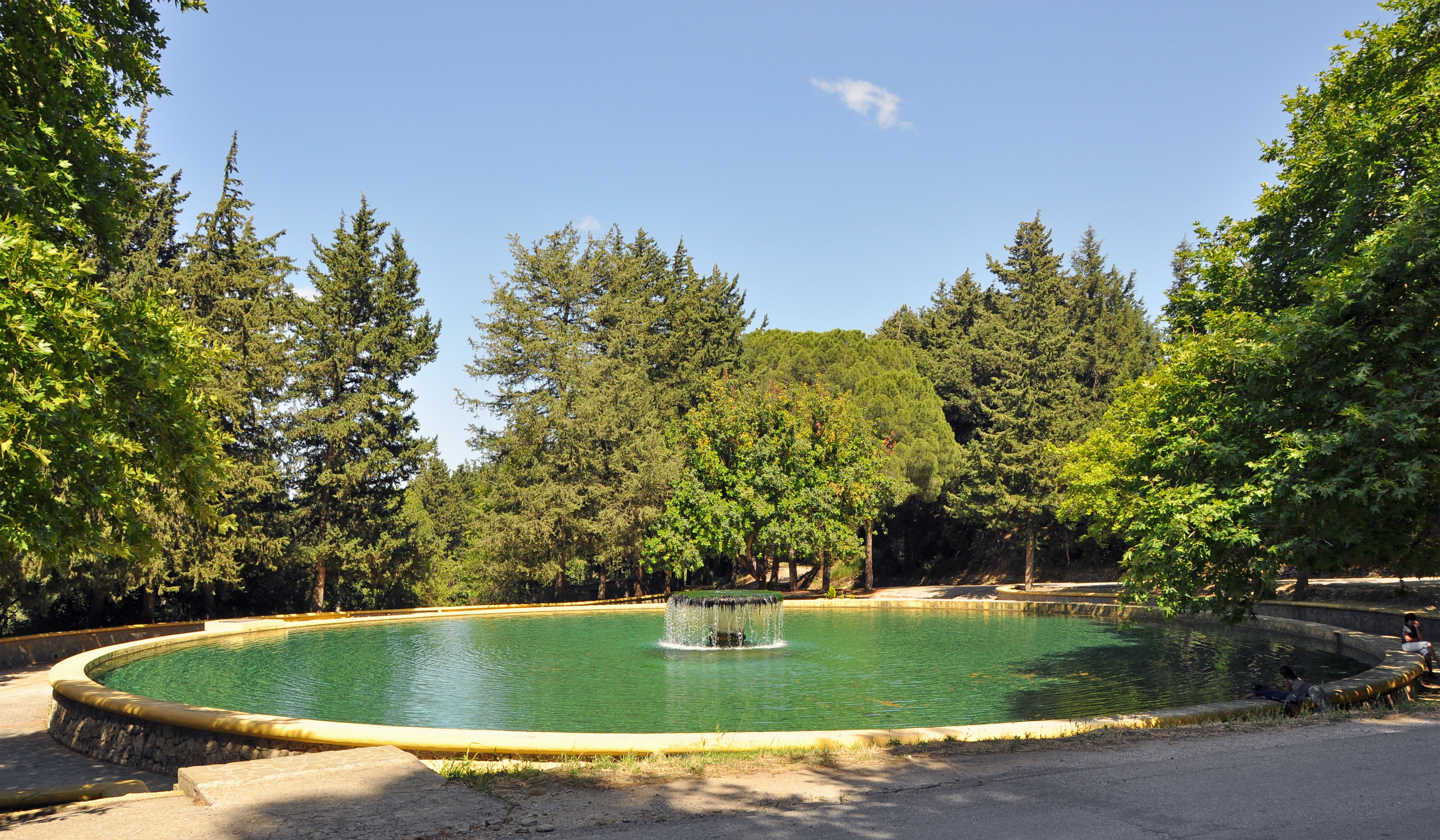
Habitat provided for Squalius ghigii at Eleousa

.

== Conservation ==
Greece is a signatory to the Berne Convention on the Conservation of European Wildlife and Natural Habitats and the Habitats Directive both affording protection to the fauna and flora of Rhodes.
