= Serapias lingua subsp. stenopetala =

Conservation status
- Critically Endangered (IUCN 3.1)

Scientific classification
- Kingdom: Plantae
- Clade: Tracheophytes
- Clade: Angiosperms
- Clade: Monocots
- Order: Asparagales
- Family: Orchidaceae
- Subfamily: Orchidoideae
- Genus: Serapias
- Species: S. lingua
- Subspecies: S. l. subsp. stenopetala

Trinomial name
- Serapias lingua subsp. stenopetala (Maire & T.Stephenson) Maire & Weiller

Synonyms
- Serapias stenopetala Maire & T.Stephenson

Subspecies of orchid

Serapias lingua subsp. stenopetala, synonym Serapias stenopetala, is a subspecies of orchid in the genus Serapias. The common name of the plant is sérapias à pétales étroits in French. The plant is native to Algeria and Tunisia.
