= Serapias perez-chiscanoi =

Scientific classification
- Kingdom: Plantae
- Clade: Tracheophytes
- Clade: Angiosperms
- Clade: Monocots
- Order: Asparagales
- Family: Orchidaceae
- Subfamily: Orchidoideae
- Genus: Serapias
- Species: S. perez-chiscanoi

Binomial name
- Serapias perez-chiscanoi Acedo
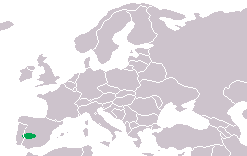
- Range of S. perez-chiscanoi in Europe

Synonyms
- Serapias viridis Pérez-Chisc.

Species of orchid

Serapias perez-chiscanoi is a species of orchid endemic to Portugal and western Spain.
