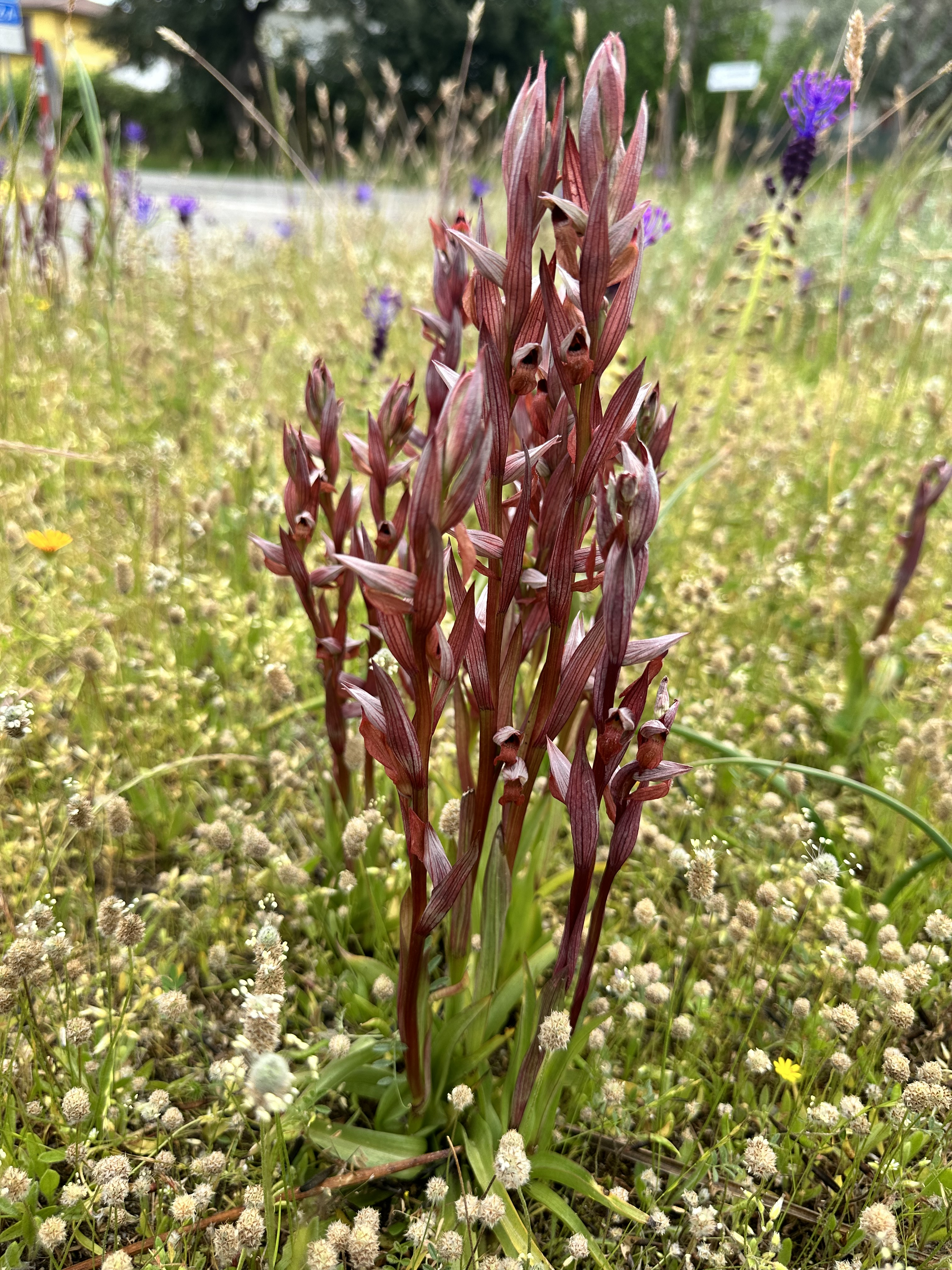
- Habitus of Serapias vomeracea

Scientific classification
- Kingdom: Plantae
- Clade: Tracheophytes
- Clade: Angiosperms
- Clade: Monocots
- Order: Asparagales
- Family: Orchidaceae
- Subfamily: Orchidoideae
- Genus: Serapias
- Species: S. vomeracea

Binomial name
- Serapias vomeracea (Burm.f.) Briq.

Synonyms
- Orchis vomeracea Burm.f. (basionym); Serapiastrum vomeraceum (Burm.f.) Schinz & Thell.; Serapias cordigera ssp. vomeracea (Burm.f.) H.Sund.; Helleborine longipetala Ten.; Serapias longipetala (Ten) Pollini

= Serapias vomeracea =

Species of orchid

Serapias vomeracea, common name long-lipped serapias or plow-share serapias, is a species of orchid in the genus Serapias.

== Etymology ==
The name Serapias of the genus derives from the Greek Sarapis, the Graeco-Egyptian god, already used in ancient times to name some orchids. The Latin name vomeracea of this species refers to the shape of the apical portion of the labellum (epichile) reminiscent of a ploughshare.

== Description ==
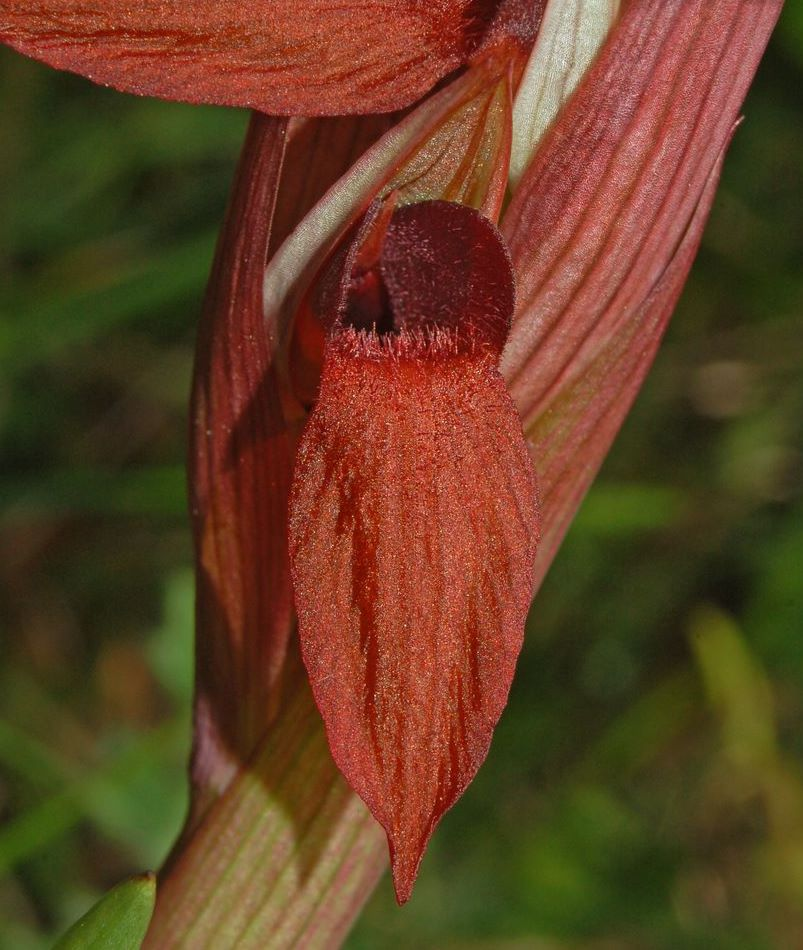
Close-up on a flowers of Serapias vomeracea

Serapias vomeracea is an herbaceous perennial plant with two ovoidal underground tubers. This species is highly variable in color and shape. It reaches a height of 20–40 centimetres (7.9–15.7 in), with a maximum of 60 centimetres (24 in). The stem is green, with two membranous basal leaves and 6-8 upper leaves, lanceolate and glossy green or reddish.

The inflorescence is composed by a narrow and elongated spike, with three to ten flowers. The relevant bracts are lanceolate and much longer than the tepals. Their color is red-purple, with darker longitudinal venation. The outer tepals are lanceolate and erect, forming a helmet-like structure. Their color is purple-red or pinkish, with veins of darker color. The internal lateral tepals are brownish-purple and almost entirely hidden by the helmet.

The labellum is brick red, trilobed and larger than the other tepals. The basal portion (hypochile) of the labellum is concave and enclosed in the helmet, with two raised and hairy lateral lobes. The apical portion of the labellum (epichile) is triangular-lanceolate, usually purple-red and quite hairy. The spur is missing. The flowering period extends from March to June.

== Reproduction ==
Serapias vomeracea is an entomophilous plant, but cannot offer floral rewards to pollinators as it does not produce nectar. Therefore, pollinators are just attracted by the shape of the flower, forming a small tube used by insects to rest by night or as a refuge against the rain. In this process pollen gets stuck to the pollinators' bodies. Once they leave their shelter, they will deposit the pollen on other flowers and fertilize them. These orchids are mainly pollinated by some beetles (families Oedemeridae and Lymexylidae) and by bees (genera Ceratina, Eucera and Osmia). Seeds are dispersed by the wind (anemochory).

== Subspecies ==
- Serapias vomeracea (Burm. f.) Briq. subsp. vomeracea
- Serapias vomeracea (Burm. f.) Briq. subsp. longipetala (Ten.) H. Baumann & Künkele
- Serapias vomeracea (Burm. f.) Briq. subsp. laxiflora (Soó) Gölz & H.R. Reinhard

== Distribution ==
The species has a Mediterranean- Atlantic distribution from Charente in the north and is widespread from south-central Europe, the Mediterranean Basin to Cyprus.

== Habitat ==
This orchid prefers dry and wet meadows, pastures, thickets, clearings and scrubland, frequently on clayey substrate, from full light to partial shade, at an altitude of 0–1,200 metres (0–3,937 ft) above sea level.

== Gallery ==
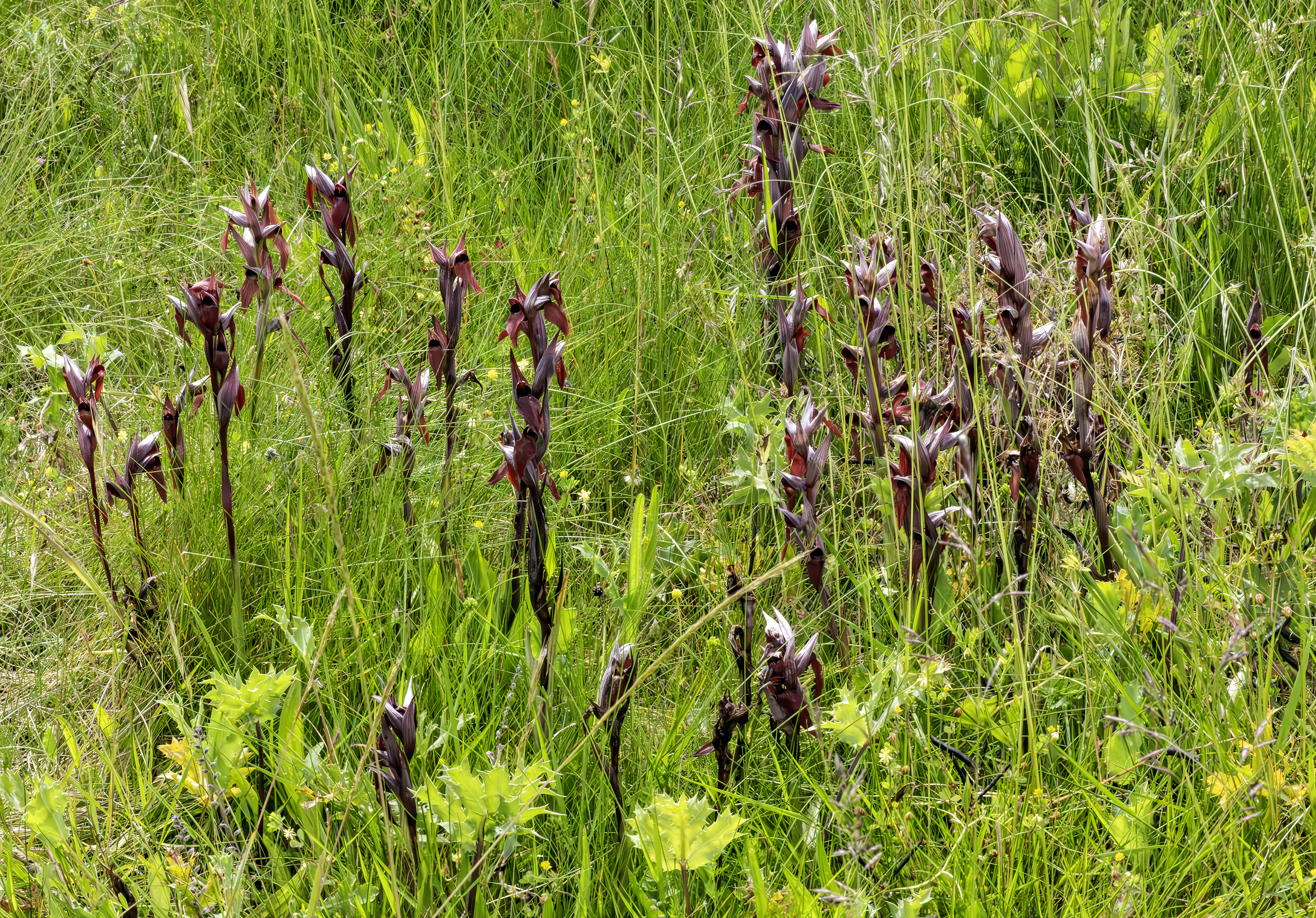
Plant of Serapias vomeracea

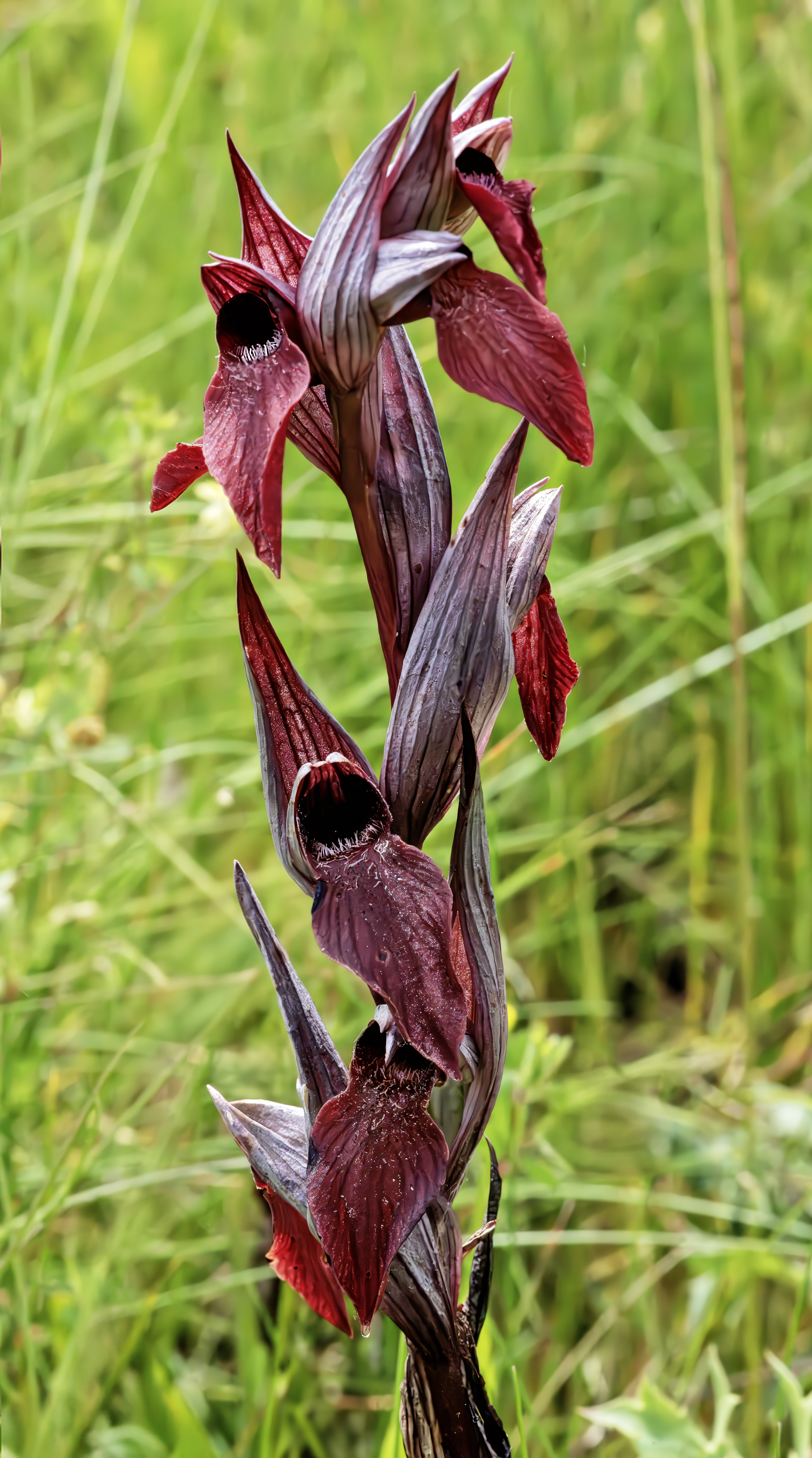
Flowers of Serapias vomeracea

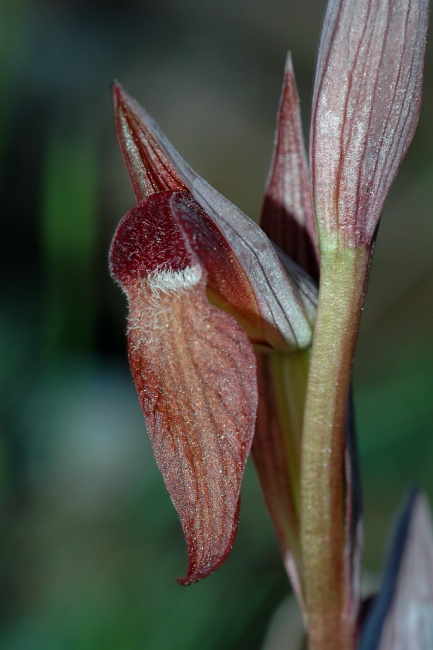
Close-up on a flowers of Serapias vomeracea

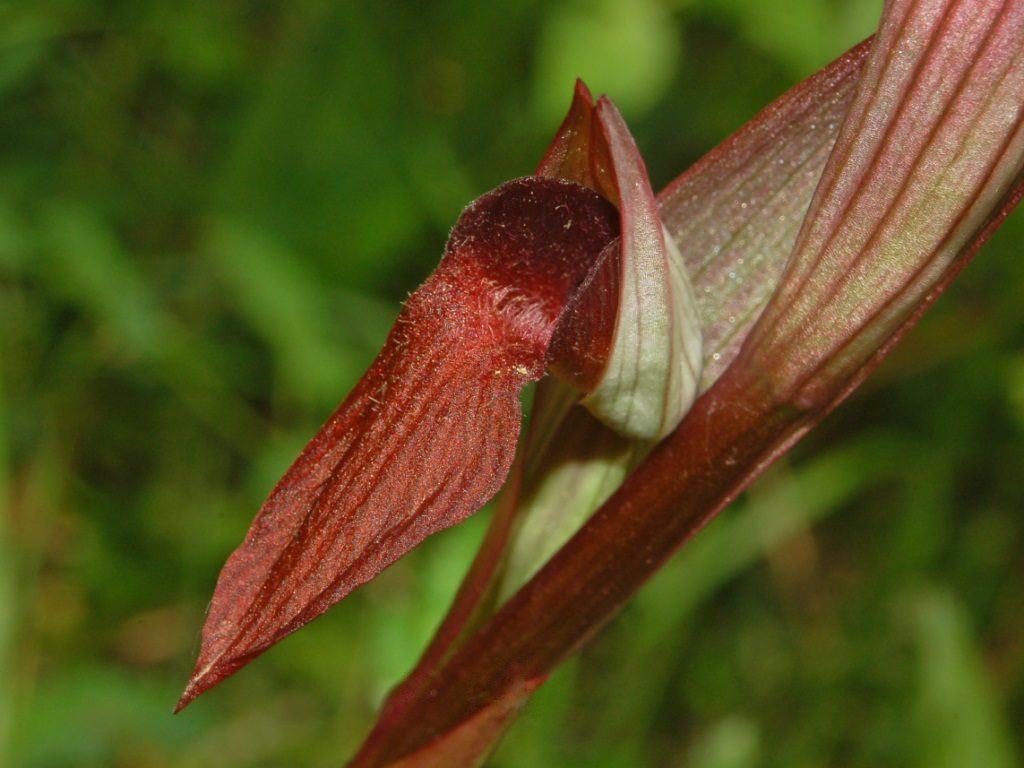
Close-up on a flowers of Serapias vomeracea

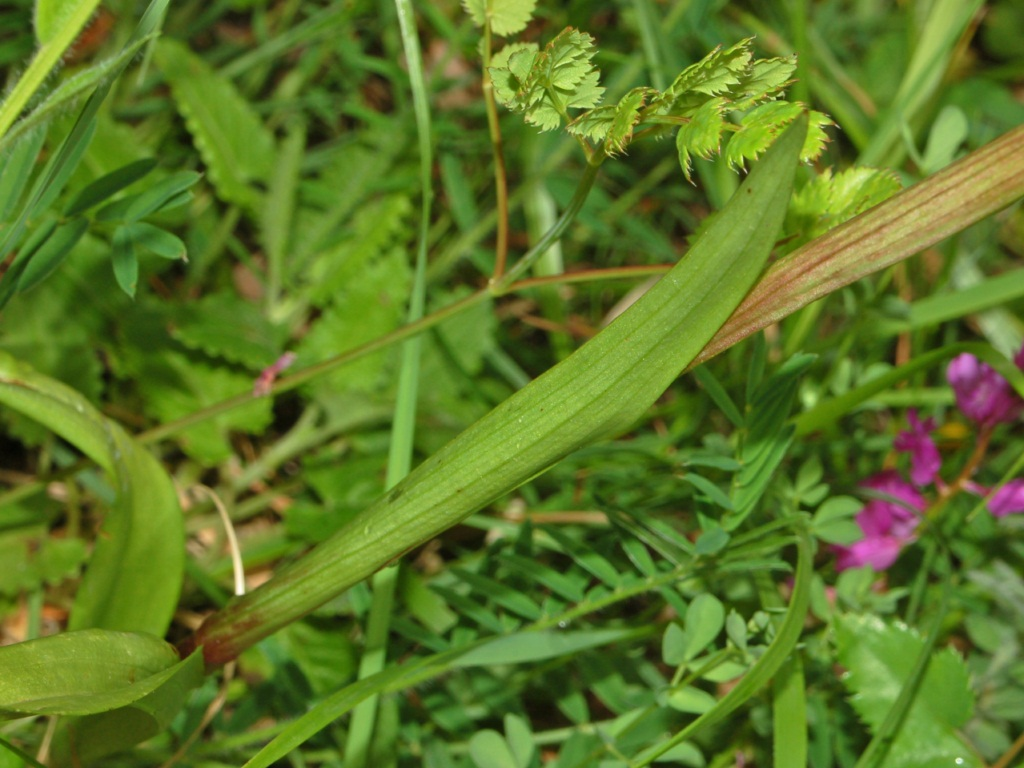
Leaf of Serapias vomeracea
