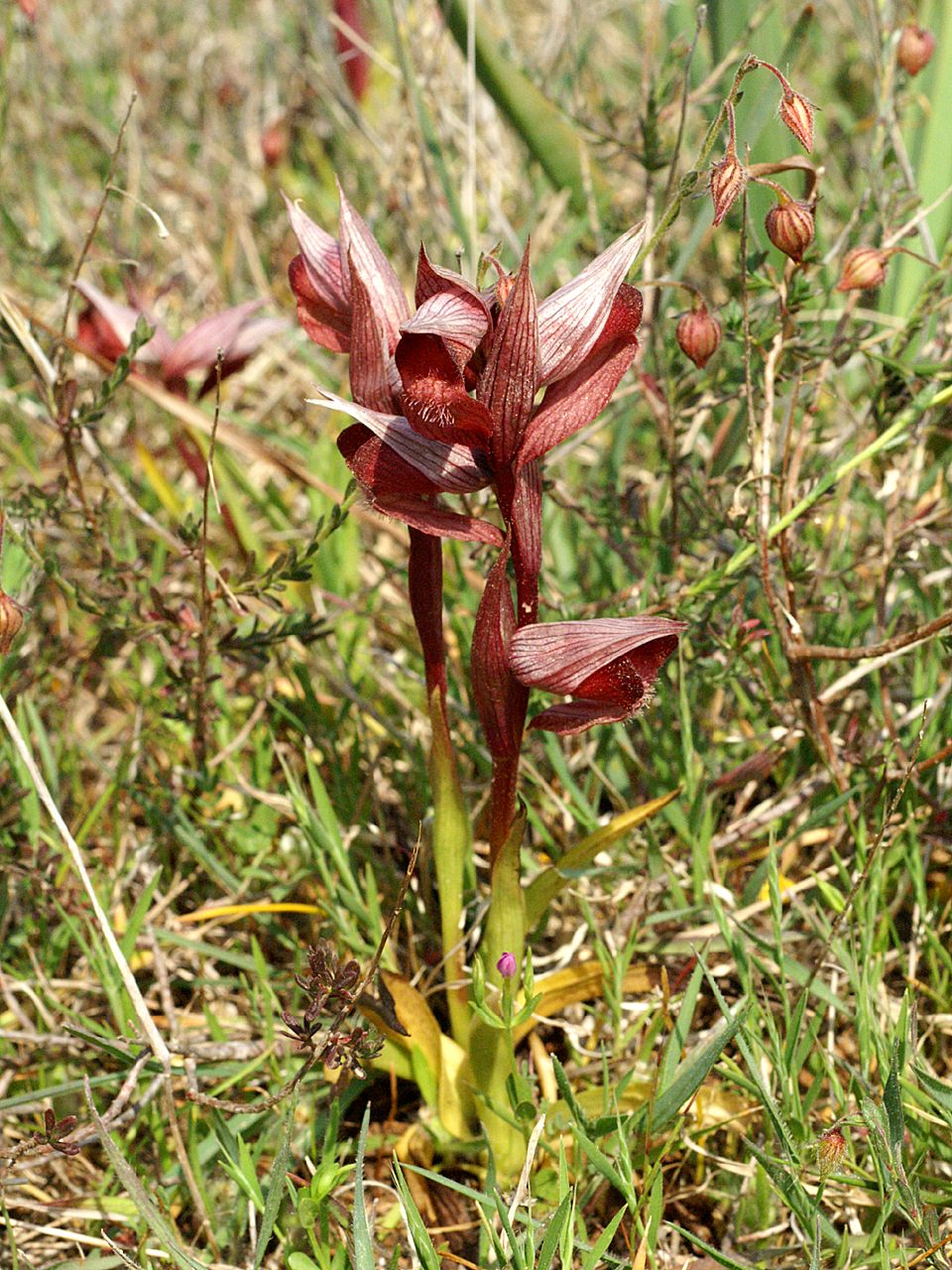
- Flower of Serapias orientalis

Scientific classification
- Kingdom: Plantae
- Clade: Tracheophytes
- Clade: Angiosperms
- Clade: Monocots
- Order: Asparagales
- Family: Orchidaceae
- Subfamily: Orchidoideae
- Genus: Serapias
- Species: S. orientalis

Binomial name
- Serapias orientalis (Greuter) H.Baumann & Künkele

Synonyms
- Serapias vomeracea ssp. orientalis Greuter (basionym)

= Serapias orientalis =

Species of orchid

Serapias orientalis is a species of orchids occurring from the east-central and eastern Mediterranean to the western Transcaucasus.

== Subspecies ==
- Serapias orientalis subsp. apulica H.Baumann & Künkele, 1989
- Serapias orientalis subsp. carica H. Baumann & Künkele, 1989
- Serapias orientalis subsp. levantina (H. Baumann & Künkele) Kreutz, 2004
- Serapias orientalis subsp. orientalis
- Serapias orientalis subsp. siciliensis Bartolo & Pulv., 1993
