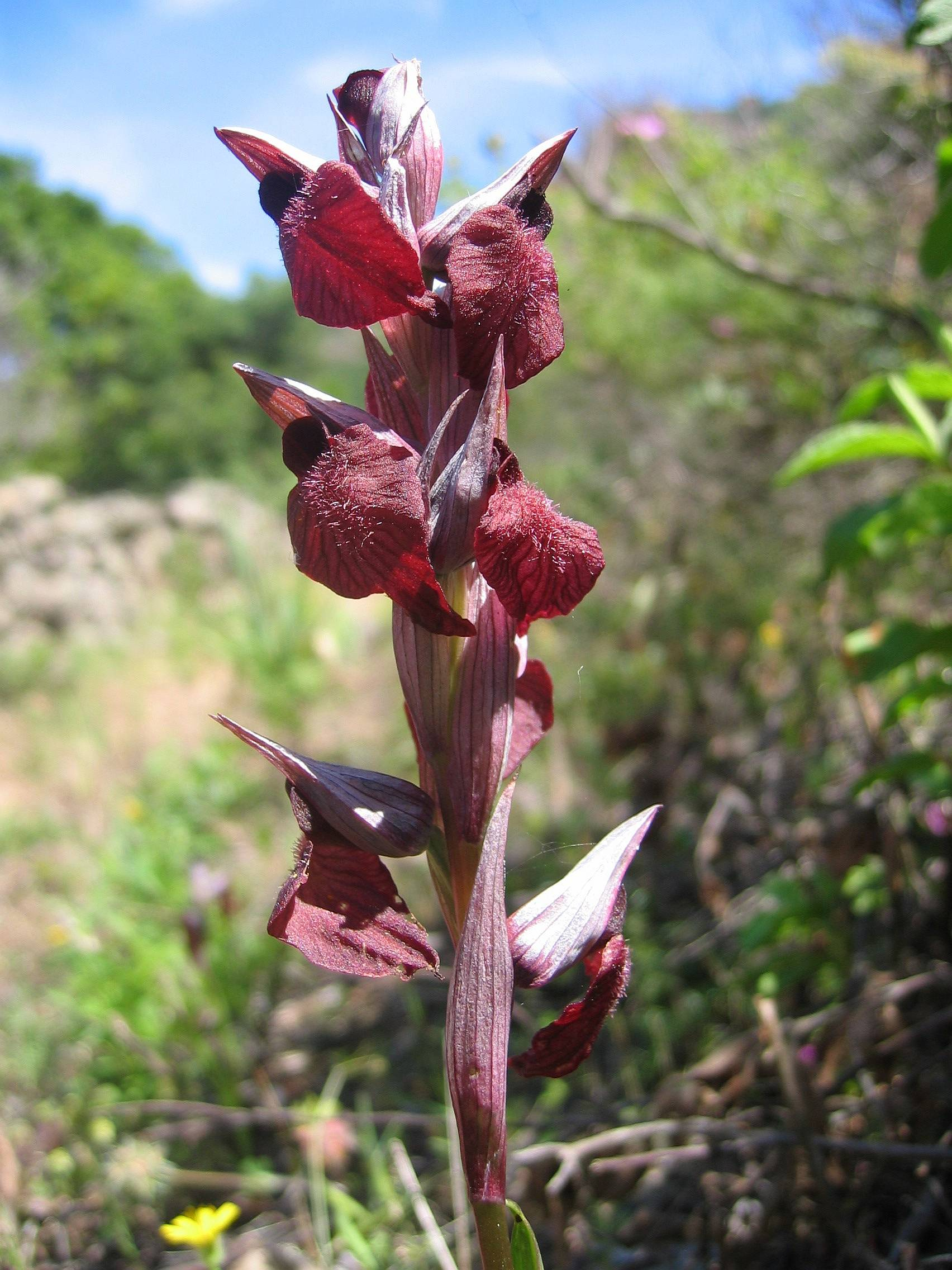
- Flower of Serapias cordigera

Scientific classification
- Kingdom: Plantae
- Clade: Tracheophytes
- Clade: Angiosperms
- Clade: Monocots
- Order: Asparagales
- Family: Orchidaceae
- Subfamily: Orchidoideae
- Genus: Serapias
- Species: S. cordigera

Binomial name
- Serapias cordigera L.

Synonyms
- Helleborine cordigera (L.) Pers.; Lonchitis cordigera (L.) Bubani; Serapiastrum cordigerum (L.) A.A.Eaton

= Serapias cordigera =

Species of orchid

Serapias cordigera is a species of orchids found from the Azores, south-central Europe to the Mediterranean.
