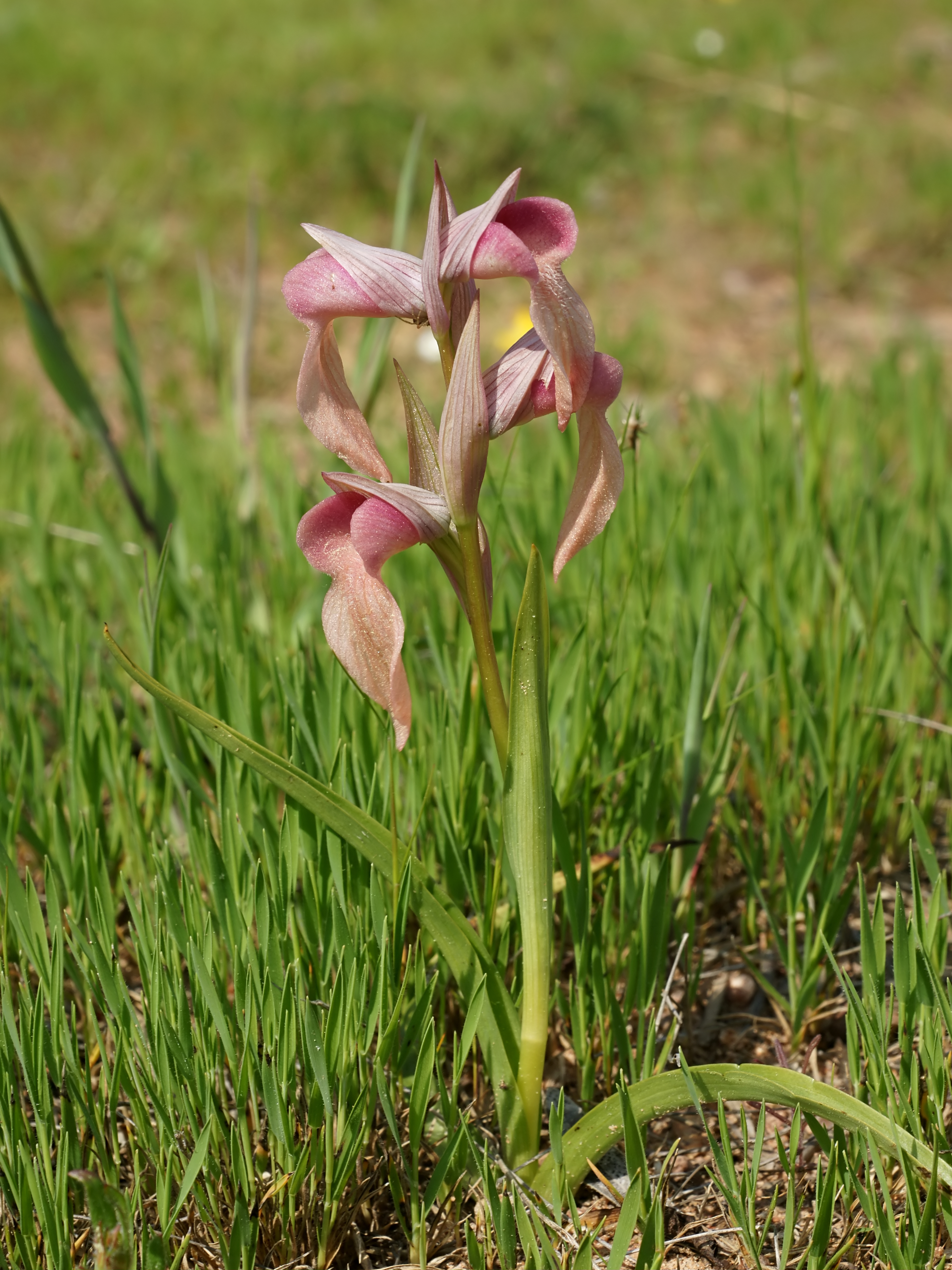
- Flower of Serapias neglecta

Scientific classification
- Kingdom: Plantae
- Clade: Tracheophytes
- Clade: Angiosperms
- Clade: Monocots
- Order: Asparagales
- Family: Orchidaceae
- Subfamily: Orchidoideae
- Genus: Serapias
- Species: S. neglecta

Binomial name
- Serapias neglecta De Not.

Synonyms
- Isias triloba De Not.; Serapias cordigera subsp. neglecta (De Not.) K.Richt.; S. c. var. neglecta (De Not.) Fiori & Paol.; Serapiastrum neglectum (De Not.) A.A.Eaton

= Serapias neglecta =

Species of orchid

Serapias neglecta, the scarce tongue-orchid, is a species of orchid endemic to southern Europe.
