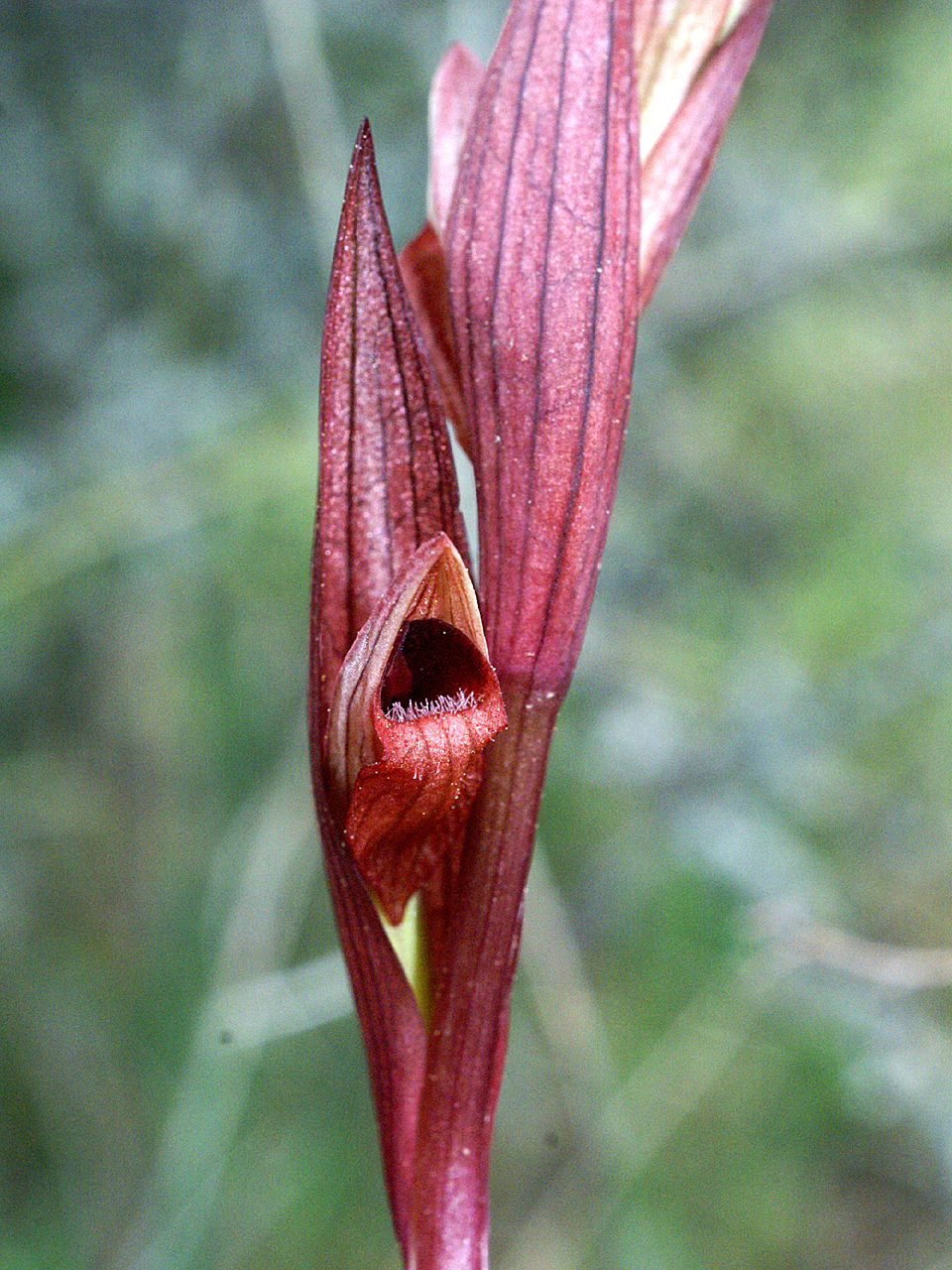
- Flower of Serapias bergonii

Scientific classification
- Kingdom: Plantae
- Clade: Tracheophytes
- Clade: Angiosperms
- Clade: Monocots
- Order: Asparagales
- Family: Orchidaceae
- Subfamily: Orchidoideae
- Genus: Serapias
- Species: S. bergonii

Binomial name
- Serapias bergonii E.G.Camus

Synonyms
- Serapias laxiflora Chaub.; Serapias pseudocordigera var. laxiflora Nyman; Serapias wettsteinii Fleischm.; Serapias hellenica Renz; Serapias parviflora ssp. laxiflora Soó; Serapias vomeracea ssp. laxiflora (Soó) Gölz & H.R.Reinhard; Serapias cordigera ssp. laxiflora (Soó) H.Sund.

= Serapias bergonii =

Species of orchid

Serapias bergonii is a species of orchids found from Italy to western and southern Turkey.

== Occurrence in the UK ==
In 2021, a tongue orchid was found growing in an undisclosed location in Suffolk, and assumed to be lesser tongue orchid. In 2022 after repeated visits by naturalists the ID was reassessed as Serapias bergonii, and suggested as such by Sean Cole, Kew Gardens, and an undisclosed academic. Considering it is native to the SE Mediterranean, it was assumed to have been deliberately planted here. However, in 2023 it emerged that it was not planted there. The orchid grows on private land with limited public access, and it is difficult to see where it could have originated from. There are plans to get the orchids further assessed in 2024 by other academics.
