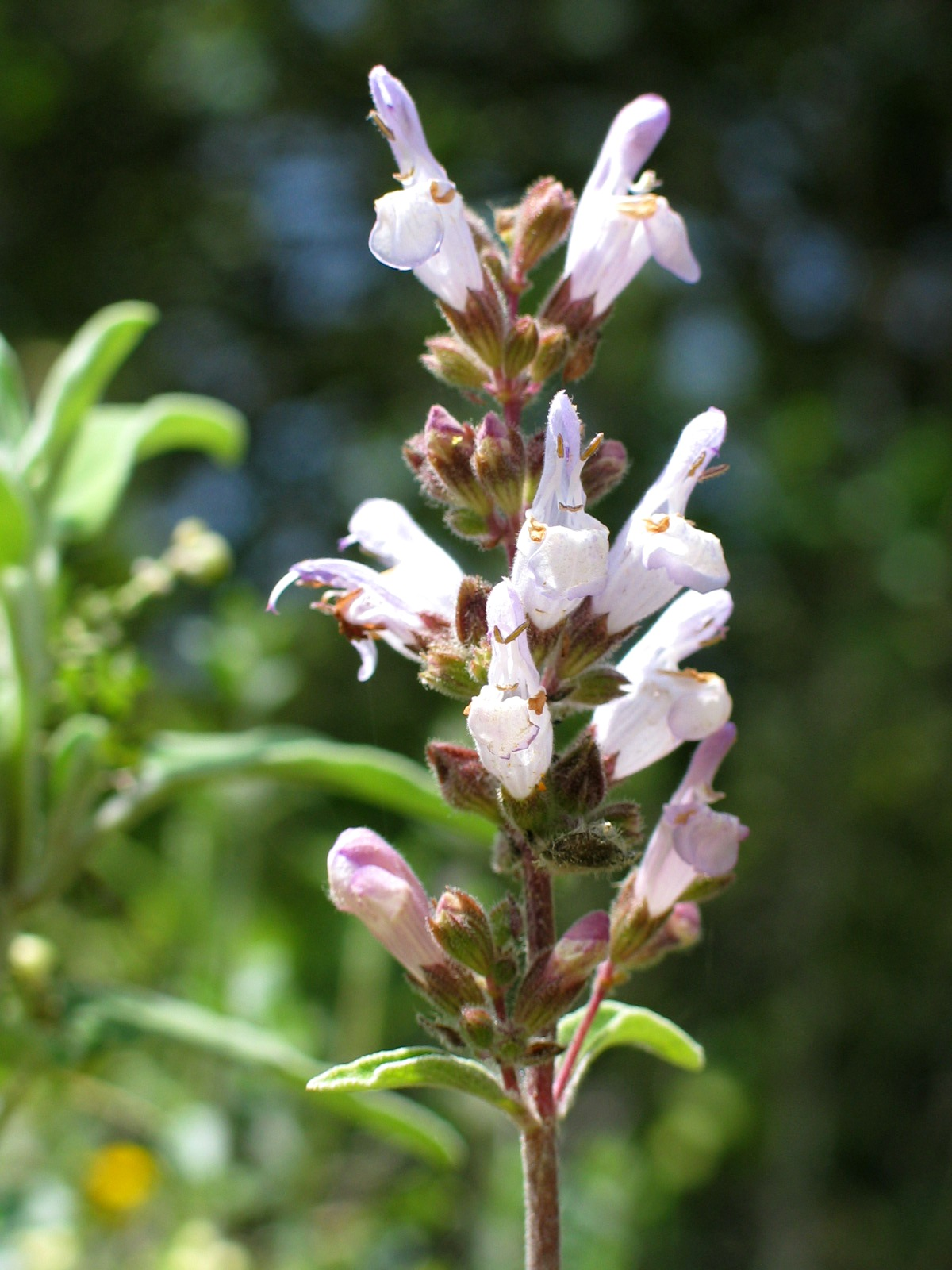

Scientific classification
- Kingdom: Plantae
- Clade: Tracheophytes
- Clade: Angiosperms
- Clade: Eudicots
- Clade: Asterids
- Order: Lamiales
- Family: Lamiaceae
- Genus: Salvia
- Species: S. fruticosa

Binomial name
- Salvia fruticosa Mill.

Synonyms
- Salvia libanotica Boiss. & Gaill.: Salvia triloba L.; Salvia cypria; Salvia lobryana Azn.; Salvia marrubioides J.Vahl; Salvia ovata F.Dietr.; Salvia sipylea Lam.; Salvia subtriloba Schrank; Salvia clusii Jacq.

= Salvia fruticosa =

Species of shrub

Salvia fruticosa, or Greek sage, is a perennial herb or sub-shrub native to the eastern Mediterranean, including Southern Italy, the Canary Islands and North Africa. It is especially abundant in Palestine, Israel, and Lebanon.

== Description ==
Greek sage grows 0.6 metres (2 ft) high and wide, with the flower stalks rising 0.3 m (1 ft) or more above the foliage. The entire plant is covered with hairs, with numerous leaves of various sizes growing in clusters, giving it a silvery and bushy appearance. The flowers are pinkish-lavender, about 1.3 centimetres (1/2 in) long, growing in whorls along the inflorescence and held in a small oxblood-red five-pointed hairy calyx.

== Taxonomy ==
Due its wide variation in leaf shape, there has been a great deal of taxonomic confusion over the years, with many of the leaf variations of S. fruticosa being named as distinct species. These include S. libanotica, S. triloba, S. lobryana, and S. cypria, which are now considered to be S. fruticosa. The variation in leaf depends on geographical area, with plants growing on the western part of Crete having entire leaves with flat blade and margins and dark green upper sides. Plants growing on the eastern side of the island have much smaller leaves, with deeply three-lobed yellowish-green blade and undulate margins. The variation continues throughout different parts of Greece.

Adding to the confusion over the name, the plant has also been called S. triloba, as named by Carl Linnaeus the Younger in 1781, until it was discovered that it was the same as the plant named by Philip Miller in 1768, with the earlier name receiving preference according to plant naming conventions. Local names include sage apple, Khokh barri, and Na’ama Hobeiq’es-sedr.

== Distribution and habitat ==
The species is native to the eastern Mediterranean, including Southern Italy, the Canary Islands and North Africa. It is especially abundant in Palestine, Israel, and Lebanon.

In its native environment it grows as part of the Maquis shrubland and several other open plant communities, but populations composed entirely of S. fruticosa are not uncommon.

== Ecology ==
In its native habitat, the plant frequently develops woolly galls about 2.5 cm in diameter which are called 'apples'. The formation of galls was originally thought to be limited to S. pomifera, which led to the misidentification of many gall-bearing S. fruticosa plants. In 2001, it was discovered that the galls on S. fruticosa were caused by a previously undiscovered genus of Cynipid gall wasp.

== Uses ==
It has a long tradition of use in Greece, where it is valued for its beauty, medicinal value, and culinary use, along with its sweet nectar and pollen. Salvia fruticosa was depicted in a Minoan fresco circa 1400 BCE at Knossos on the island of Crete. The ancient Phoenicians and Greeks likely introduced the plant for cultivation to the Iberian peninsula, with remnant populations of these introduced plants still found in some coastal areas. In Ottoman Palestine, the flower's pollen was harvested by honey bees in the production of honey.

It is grown as an ornamental flowering shrub, preferring full sun, well-draining soil, and good air circulation. Hardy to 20 °F (−7 °C), it is very drought resistant. The leaves have a high oil content, with some of the same chemicals as lavender.

Greek sage accounts for 50–95% of the dried sage sold in North America, and is grown commercially for its essential oil. It also has a long tradition of use in various Muslim rituals—for newborn children, at weddings, in funerals, and burnt as incense. A cross between S. fruticosa and S. officinalis developed in the middle east is called "silver leaf sage" or Salvia" Newe Ya'ar'", and is used in cooking.

The 'apples' are peeled and eaten when soft, described in The New Book of Salvias as fragrant, juicy, and tasty.
