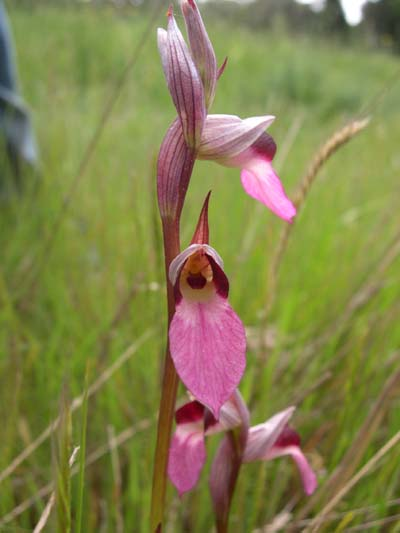
- Flower of Serapias lingua

Scientific classification
- Kingdom: Plantae
- Clade: Tracheophytes
- Clade: Angiosperms
- Clade: Monocots
- Order: Asparagales
- Family: Orchidaceae
- Subfamily: Orchidoideae
- Genus: Serapias
- Species: S. lingua

Binomial name
- Serapias lingua L.

Synonyms
- Helleborine lingua (L.) Pers.; Orchis lingua (L.) Scop.; Serapiastrum lingua (L.) A.A.Eaton

= Serapias lingua =

Species of orchid

Serapias lingua, commonly known as tongue-orchid or the tongue Serapias, is a species of orchid native to the Mediterranean.

== Habitat and distribution ==
Serapias lingua can be found in damp meadows, open fields, marshlands, and sometimes garrigue of Portugal, Spain, Malta, France, Italy, Yugoslavia, Albania, Greece, the Mediterranean islands west of Crete, and western North Africa. It has also been recorded from some sites in southern England, where it is unclear if it is naturally occurring.

== Flowering ==
Serapias lingua flowers from April to May or early June. The plant grows from 10 to 30 cm, with 2–8 flowers per spike. The labellum can be yellowish, pink, or magenta.
