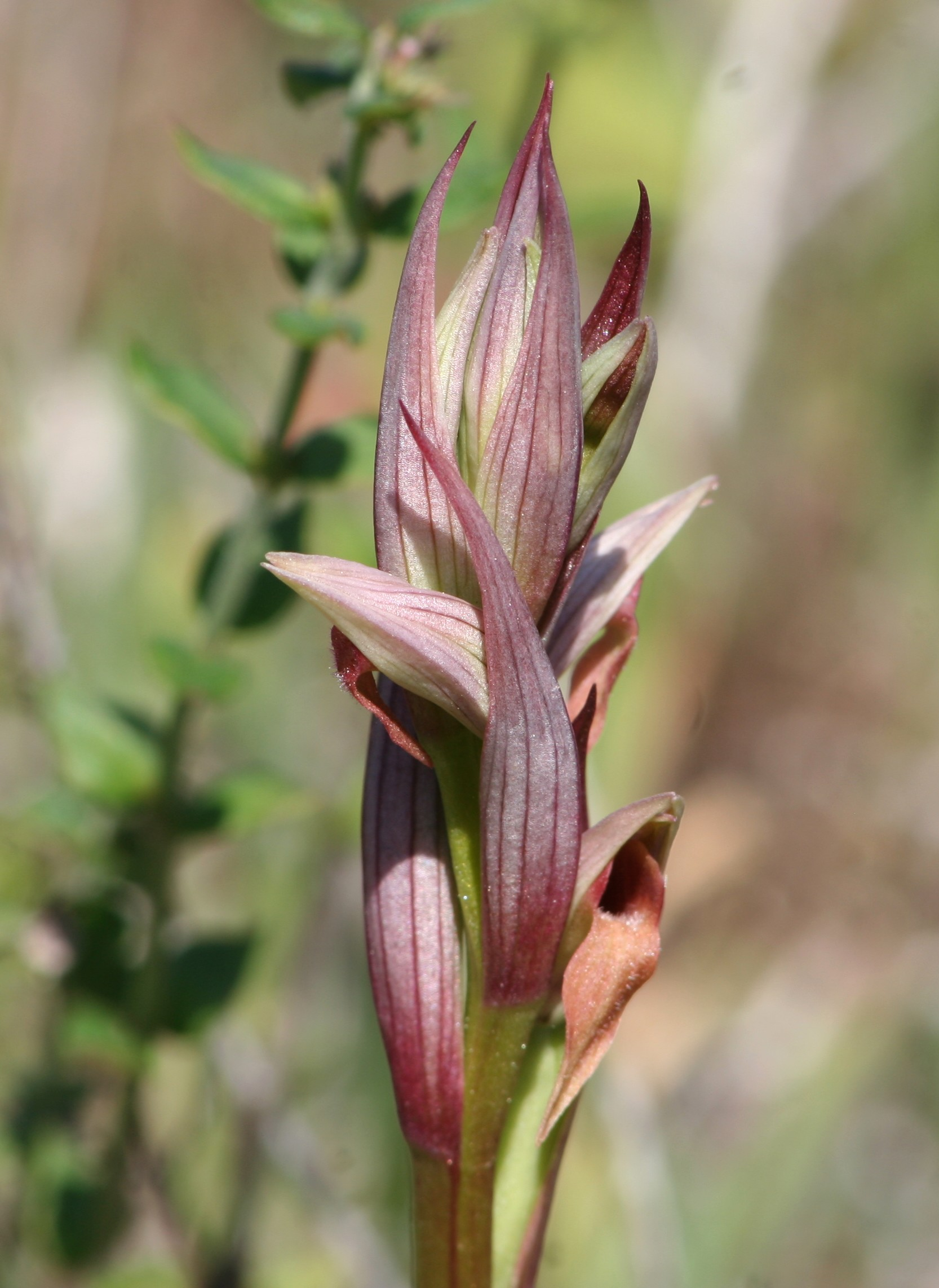
- Inflorescence of Serapias parviflora

Scientific classification
- Kingdom: Plantae
- Clade: Embryophytes
- Clade: Tracheophytes
- Clade: Spermatophytes
- Clade: Angiosperms
- Clade: Monocots
- Order: Asparagales
- Family: Orchidaceae
- Subfamily: Orchidoideae
- Genus: Serapias
- Species: S. parviflora

Binomial name
- Serapias parviflora Parl.

Synonyms
- Serapiastrum parviflorum (Parl.) A.A.Eaton; Serapias laxiflora Rchb.f.; Serapias columnae Aurnier; Serapias occultata J.Gay ex Willk.; Serapias elongata Tod.; Serapias mascaensis H.Kretzschmar, G.Kretzschmar & Kreutz

= Serapias parviflora =

Species of orchid

Serapias parviflora, the small-flowered tongue-orchid, is a species of orchid native to the Mediterranean Basin and the Atlantic coast of Europe.

== Description ==
Serapias parviflora grows to around 10–30 centimetres (4–12 in) high (occasionally up to 40 cm or 16 in). At the base of the stem, there are 4–7 keeled, linear leaves, and 1–3 bract-like leaves further up the stem. The 3–8 flowers (rarely up to 12) are arranged in a spike. The greyish-pink sepals and petals form a hood over the column and the lip, which is typically 14–19 mm (0.55–0.75 in) long.

== Distribution ==
Serapias parviflora is found natively across the Mediterranean Basin from the Iberian Peninsula to the Aegean Sea, as well as in the Canary Islands and along the Atlantic coast of France. It was discovered in 1989 at Rame Head in Cornwall (United Kingdom), and may have dispersed there naturally. That colony disappeared after 20 years, but in 2021, 16 plants were discovered growing on the 11th-floor biodiverse green roof at Nomura International's office building in the City of London.

The population of Orchids at NOMURA increased to over 29 individuals in 2022 and 40 in 2023. By early 2024 the Nomura colony had increased to over 300 individual plants thanks to sympathetic management of the green roof by the banks ecologist.

Origin of the NOMURA orchids. Examining the records of the source materials used in construction of the green roof reveal they were not sourced from anywhere near to the orchids natural range. The most plausible explanation for their arrival is wind blown seed on a weather phenomenon such as those which frequently bring Saharan dust storms to the city in spring. The timing of the orchids flowering in the southern Mediterranean and North Africa, going to seed and timings of Saharan dust storms over london in late spring happens to line up.

NOMURA are working with Kew Science laboratories and mycologists to study the orchids and hope to shed further light on their arrival in the future.
