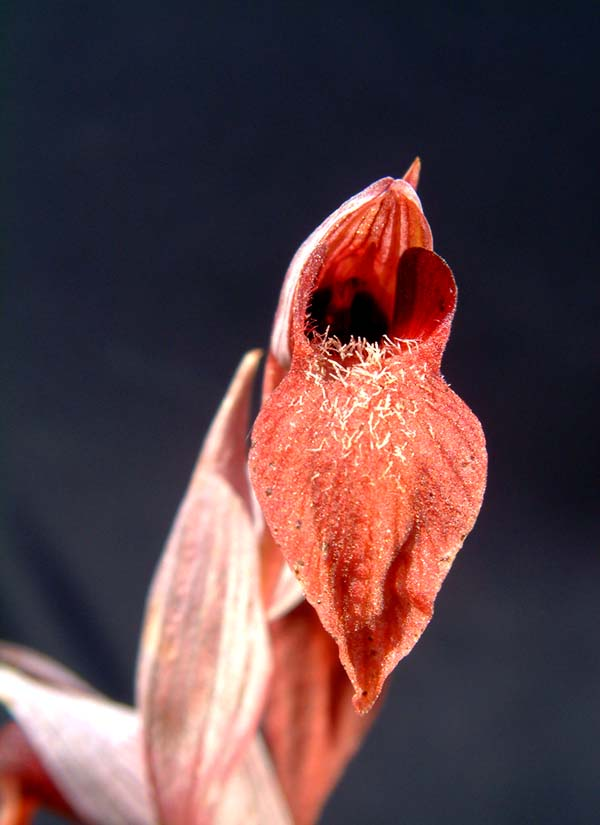
- Serapias istriaca

Scientific classification
- Kingdom: Plantae
- Clade: Tracheophytes
- Clade: Angiosperms
- Clade: Monocots
- Order: Asparagales
- Family: Orchidaceae
- Subfamily: Orchidoideae
- Tribe: Orchideae
- Subtribe: Orchidinae
- Genus: Serapias; L.

= Serapias =

Genus of terrestrial orchids

Serapias is a genus of terrestrial orchids that can be found all over southern Europe to Asia Minor. The genus was named after Serapis, a syncretic Hellenistic-Egyptian god in Antiquity. Serapias have spurless flowers and usually go dormant during the winter seasons.

== Species ==
- Serapias bergonii
- Serapias cordigera
- Serapias cossyrensis
- Serapias istriaca
- Serapias levantina
- Serapias lingua
- Serapias neglecta
- Serapias nurrica
- Serapias olbia
- Serapias orientalis
- Serapias parviflora
- Serapias perez-chiscanoi
- Serapias politisii
- Serapias strictiflora
- Serapias vomeracea

== Natural hybrids ==
- Serapias × albertii (S. neglecta × S. vomeracea)
- Serapias × ambigua (S. cordigera × S. lingua)
- Serapias × ambigua nothosubsp ambigua (S. cordigera × S. lingua)
- Serapias × ambigua nothosubsp panormosana (S. cordigera subsp. cretica × S. lingua)
- Serapias × cypria (S. bergonii × S. orientalis subsp. levantina)
- Serapias × euxina (S. bergonii × S. orientalis)
- Serapias × garganica (S. orientalis × S. vomeracea)
- Serapias × godferyi (S. cordigera × S. neglecta)
- Serapias × halacsyana (S. bergonii × S. cordigera)
- Serapias × halicarnassia (S. bergonii × S. orientalis subsp. carica)
- Serapias × intermedia (S. lingua × S. vomeracea)
- Serapias × kelleri (S. cordigera × S. vomeracea)
- Serapias × lupiensis (S. lingua × S. politisii)
- Serapias × meridionalis (S. lingua × S. neglecta)
- Serapias × oulmesiaca (S. lingua × S. cordigera subsp. cordigera)
- Serapias × provincialis (S. cordigera × S. olbia)
- Serapias × pulae (S. istriaca × S. lingua)
- Serapias × rainei (S. cordigera × S. parviflora)
- Serapias × todaroi (S. lingua × S. parviflora)
- Serapias × walravensiana (S. orientalis subsp. carica × S. lingua)
