= Alvah Augustus Eaton =

U.S. botanist (1865-1908)

Alvah Augustus Eaton (November 20, 1865 – September 29, 1908) was an American botanist who described many species of pteridophytes, orchids and grass.

== Early life ==
Eaton was born in Seabrook, New Hampshire, and moved to a family farm in Salisbury, Massachusetts when he was twelve. He finished a four-year high school education within two years at Putnam School in Newburyport.

== Career ==
He worked as a teacher for a year in Seabrook, and for three more in California, along with farming. After returning to New England, he decided to become a florist due to pressure from poor health. He went on three field trips to Florida and one to Europe for the Ames Botanical Laboratory in Easton, Massachusetts.

He was a member of the Linnean Fern Chapter, precursor to the American Fern Society. He frequently contributed to the Fern Bulletin and developed an Herbarium for the Society. Eaton issued the exsiccata-like series The genus Equisetum in North America. Fern Bulletin Distribution. Until his death in 1908, he was curator of the herbarium.

== Works ==
Much of his work is documented at the Gray Herbarium of Harvard University. The documents consist of sixteen notebooks written between approximately 1895 and 1906, four letters from 1899 to 1905, and a few undated manuscripts.
