= Geloi Wetland =

Nature conservation area in Sicilia

Coordinates: 37°06′09″N 14°20′24″E

A flamingo rests in Geloi Wetland at sunset. In the background, the skyline of Gela unfolds.

Geloi Wetland is a private nature conservation area located in the municipality of Gela, in the province of Caltanissetta (Southern Italy), created in 2017.

== History ==
In 2017, the German nonprofit organisation Stiftung Pro Artenvielfalt (Pro Biodiversity Foundation) launched a project for the protection and preservation of nature. The most important donor, next to the German one, is the homonymous sister foundation from Switzerland.https://www.stiftung-pro-artenvielfalt.ch/pdfs/2025.10.27_Taetigkeitsbericht_2024_FINAL03_LowRes.pdf

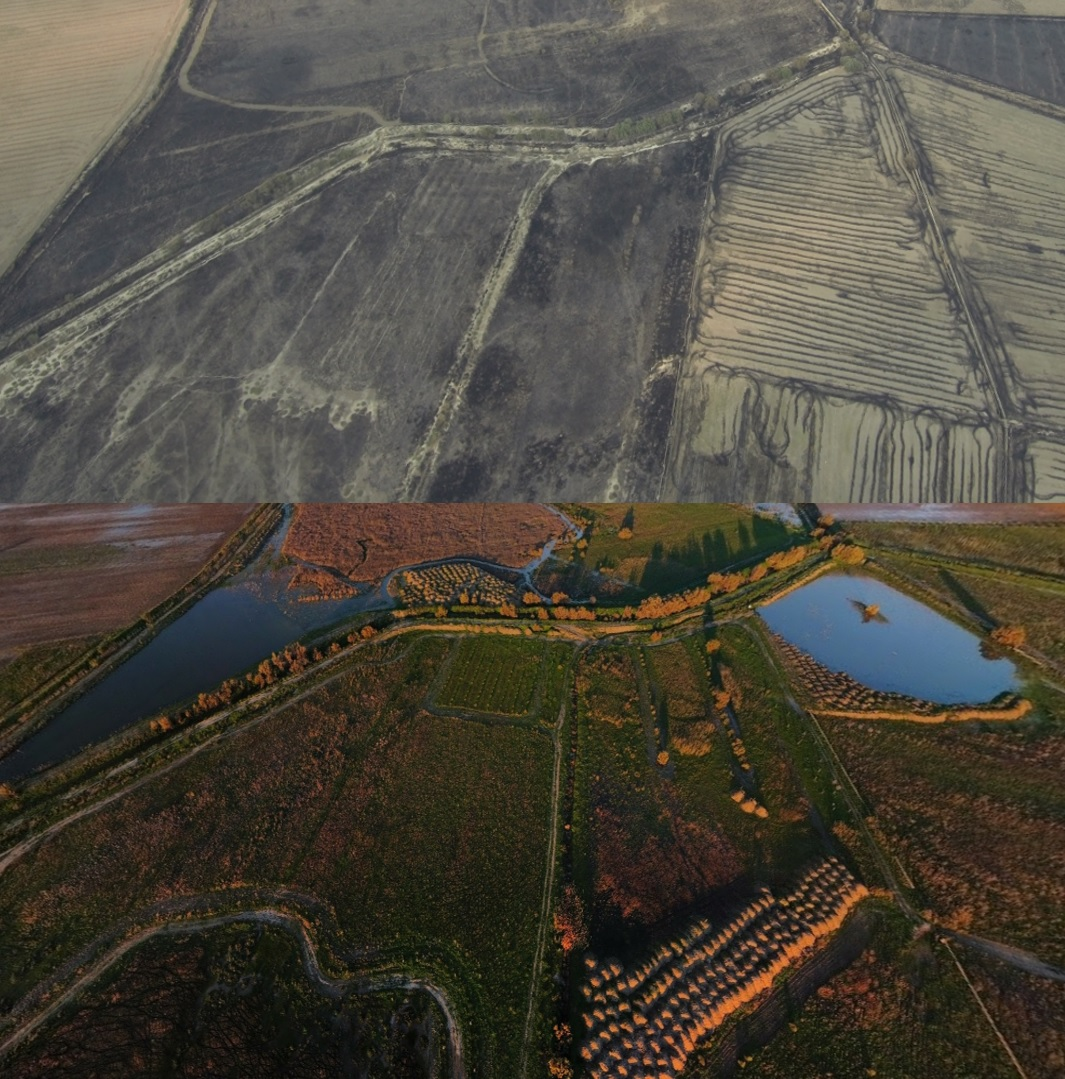
Overview of Geloi before the project, above (September 2017) and same shot in October 2020, below.

The project consists of restoring a wetland area for the conservation and protection of wild birds and, in particular, migratory birds. In addition, the strategic objectives include the creation of a buffer zone around the marshes, in which forms of local cooperation based on ethical, organic and eco-friendly agriculture are encouraged.

Its most societal and farsighted goal is "to become a stronghold of legality and virtuous model of action against desertification, pointing to the possibility to build an economical and ecological future in a way which differs from the industrial model.

== Territory ==
Geloi is located in the lowland piana di Gela, an integral part of the Special Protection Area ITA050012 " Torre Manfria, Biviere di Gela, Piana di Gela and the marine area in front ", established pursuant to the Birds Directive (2009/147 / EC). The piana di Gela is a post-Holocene coastal alluvial plain, formed by the Gela river and its tributaries Maroglio and Cimia. It borders to the north with the plain of Catania and separates the Hyblaean Mountains from the Erean Mountains, forming the gulf of Gela in the south.

"Geloi Wetland" is the original name of the project, even in Italian: the Center for Environmental Education decided to combine an English word with "Geloi", the ancient denomination of the area as it appeared in Vergil's Aeneid.

== Fauna ==
Due to its morphology and strategic geographical position, the gulf favors the crossing of Sicily by migratory birds from North Africa, particularly in spring, representing a "leading line", that is, an area located along the preferential transit route of migrating species; more than 45,000 aquatic birds were surveyed between February and April alone.

The birdlife is rich and consists of 154 observed species. The agricultural mosaic favors the nesting of some species of notable community interest such as the lesser kestrel (Falco naumanni), the Eurasian stone-curlew (Burhinus oedicnemus), the collared pratincole (Glareola pratincola), the calandra lark (Melanocorypha calandra), the greater short-toed lark (Calandrella brachydactyla), the European roller (Coracias garrulus) and the white stork (Ciconia ciconia). The size of these populations is of strategic importance for conservation on a national level, as is the presence of pseudo-steppe habitats now rare in Sicily.

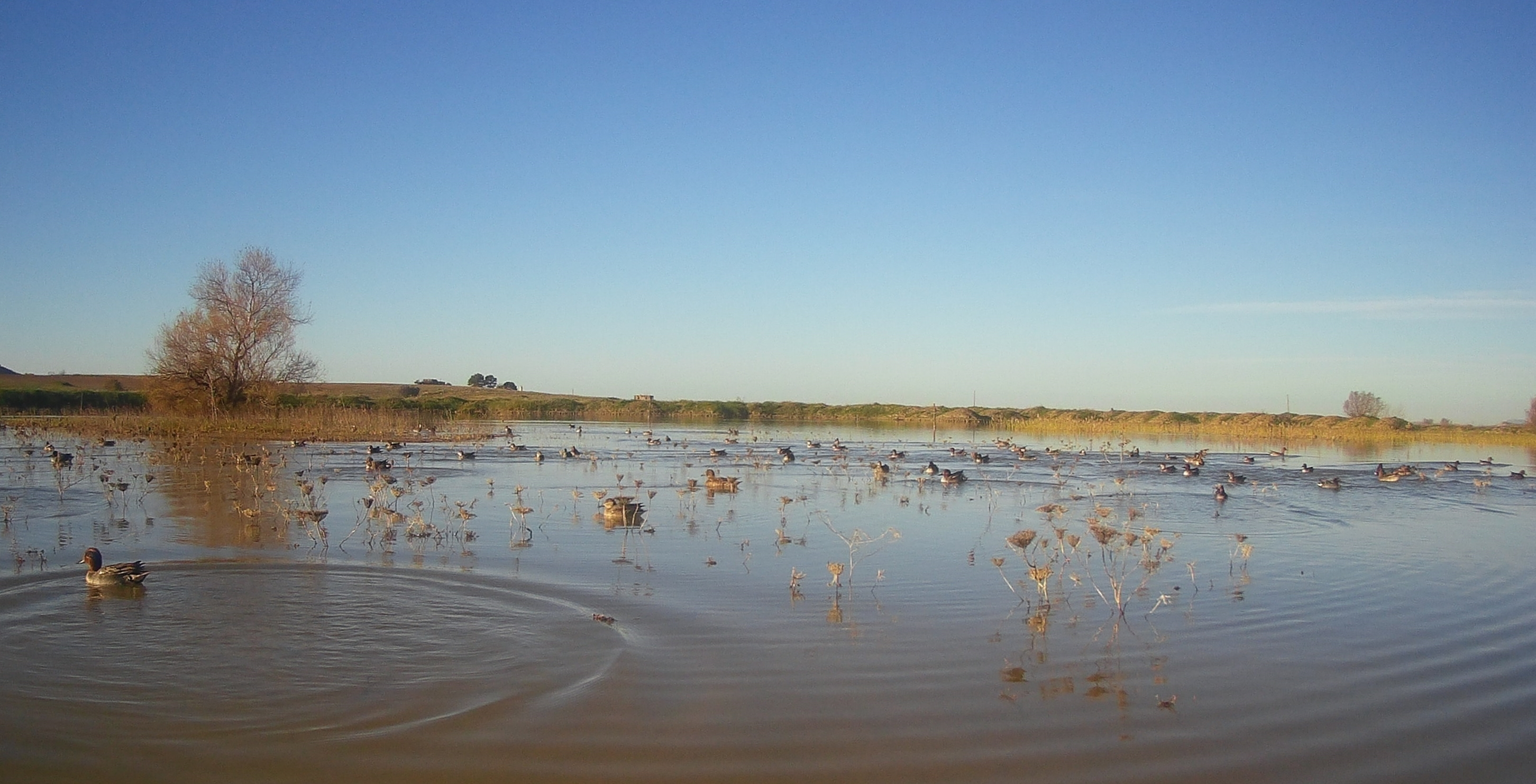
After the environmental restoration interventions of the summer of 2020, the wetland stores more water and has begun to host hundreds of aquatic bird species.

During winter, the formation of temporary marshes favors the presence of wintering water birds such as northern lapwing (Vanellus vanellus) and European golden plover (Pluvialis apricaria).

Small animals find refuge in the stone heaps created by the guardians of the nature reserve, thus providing precious macro-habitats for reptiles such as the Italian Aesculapian snake (Zamenis lineatus), the European ratsnake (Zamenis situla) and the Sicilian wall lizard (Podarcis waglerianus). Other noteworthy reptiles in the area are the European green lizard (Lacerta viridis) and the ocellated skink (Chalcides ocellatus). Furthermore, in Geloi there are 80 species of beetles, including the rare Spanish fly (Lytta vesicatoria) and the Anthicidae member Anthelephila caeruleipennis, reported for the first time in Italy precisely in Geloi. Among the mammals, Geloi hosts a large population of garden dormouse (Eliomys quercinus) and European hedgehog (Erinaceus europaeus).

== Flora ==
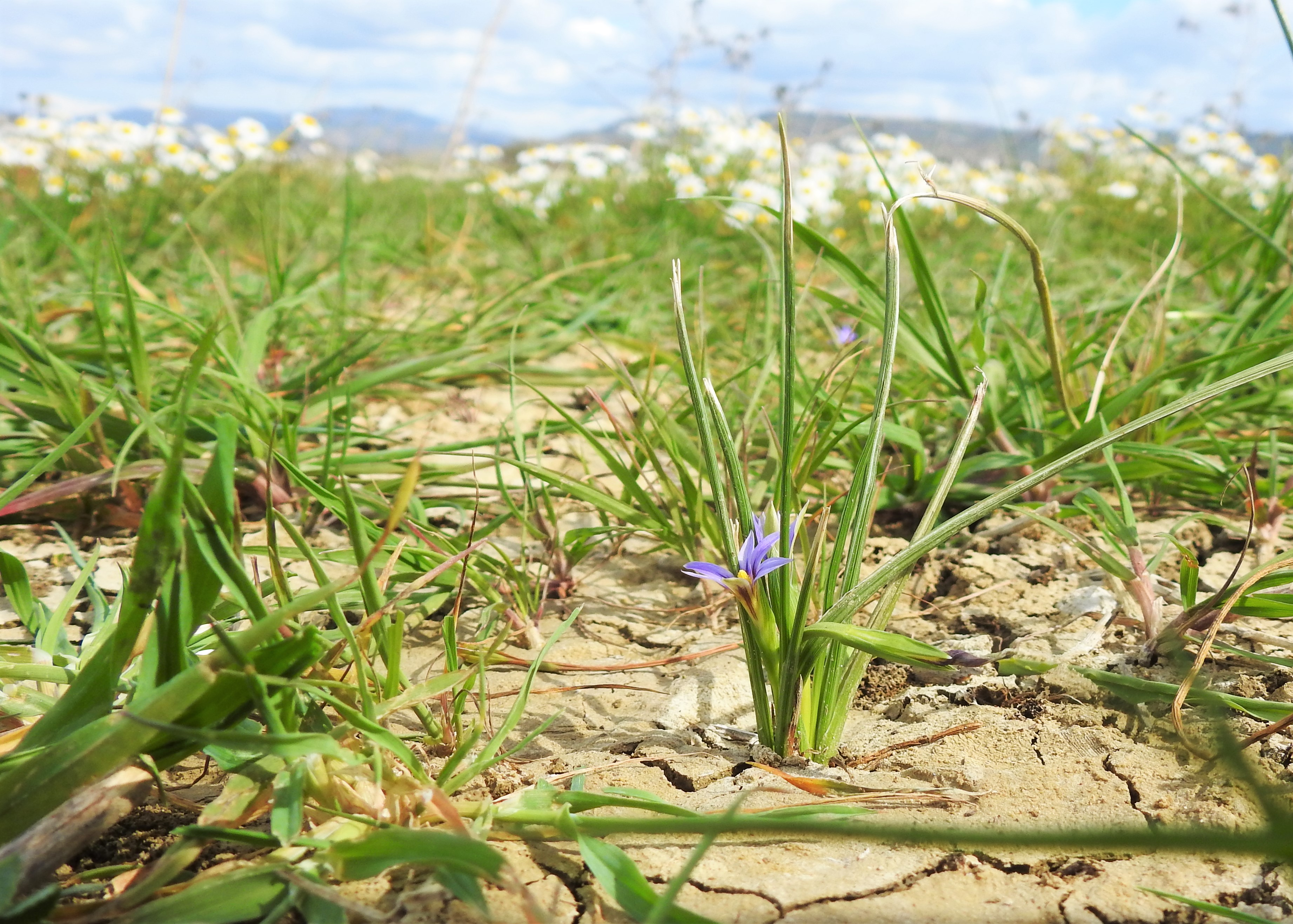
Romulea ramiflora subsp. ramiflora with Chamaemelum fuscatum in the background. The species grow on clayey soils.

The site has a diversified semi-natural biotope, which also includes the now rare environment of temporary brackish marshes on Holocene alluvial soils of a predominantly clayey nature. These environments are located within an agricultural mosaic with extensive crops and steppe-cereal expanses. There are draining channels, torrential streams, puddles, ditches, artificial lakes and watering points, in which the halophilous vegetation has very specialized formations and represented by perennial associations of the Sarcoconietea fruticosae, from annual succulent associations of Thero-Suaedetea Rivas-Martínez 1972 and from ephemeral spring lawns of Saginetea maritimae.

Until late spring the persistent marshes are home to a rich migratory avifauna that are resting or wintering and have a vegetation with thick rushes dominated by Juncus subulatus and reeds of Phragmites australis.

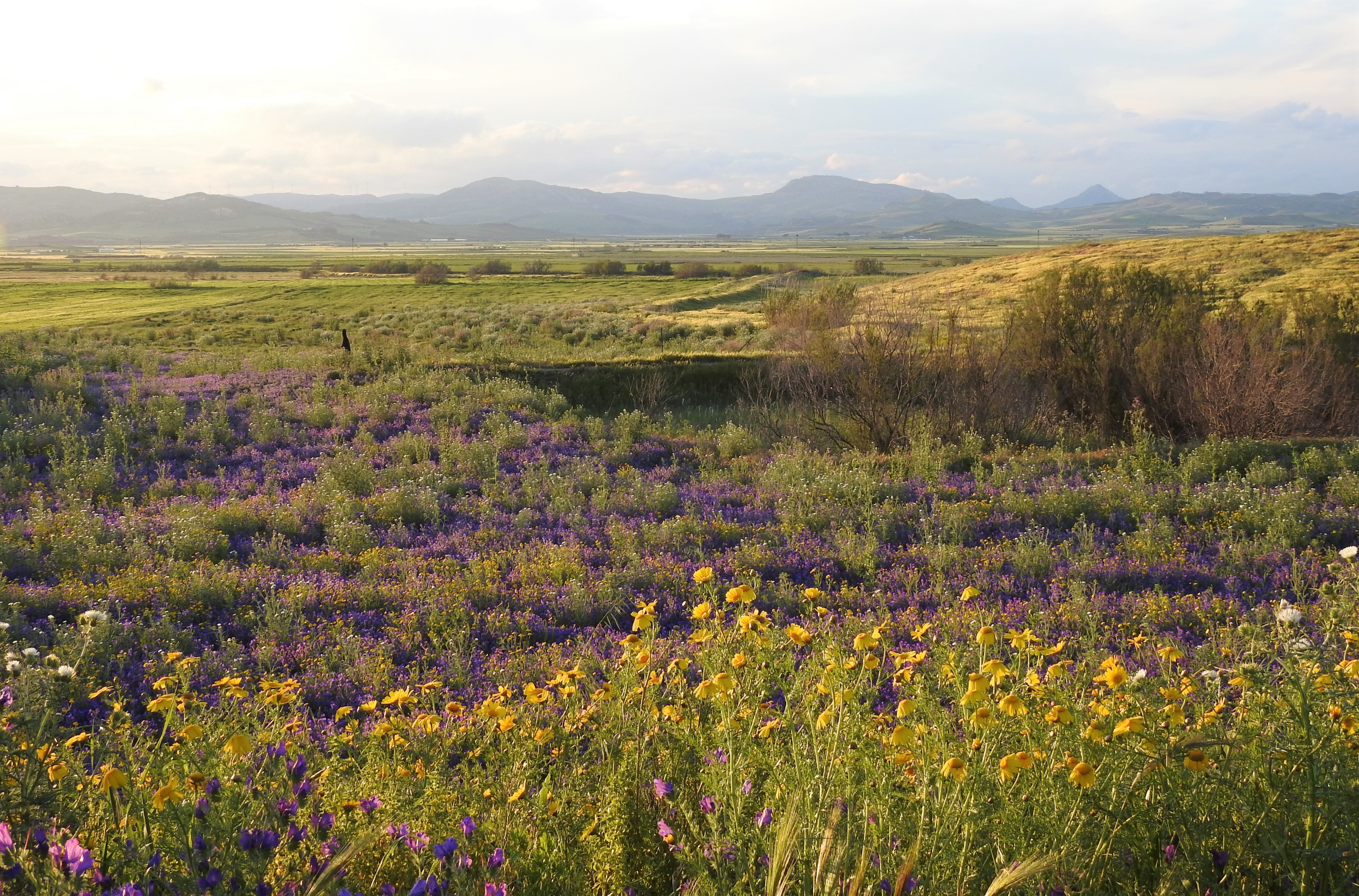
Geloi Wetland panorama in spring, with Echium blooms in purple and crown daisy chrysanthemum flowers in yellow.

In the marshy areas, rare flowers grow, such as Damasonium bourgaei (Alismataceae), Romulea ramiflora (Iridaceae) and, with late flowering, Lythrum tribracteatum and L. hyssopifolia (Lythraceae).

In the prairie areas, hygrophilous communities vegetate, marked by the presence of spontaneous phanerophytes such as Tamarix gallica and Tamarix africana (Tamaricaceae), which alternate with nitrophilic elements, both bushy and herbaceous ones, of the genera Suaeda, Salsola (Chenopodiaceae), Atriplex (Amaranthaceae), Spergularia (Caryophyllaceae) and Frankenia (Frankeniacea). The flat expanses that dry up in early spring are home to abundant meadows of Chamaemelum fuscatum (Asteraceae) and Ranunculus trilobus (Ranunculaceae). The hills, which geographically limit the territory of Geloi, host mixed orchards, olive groves, rows of shrubs in Olea europaea var. sylvestris and other Mediterranean species planted following European funding promoted by the European Agricultural Fund for Rural Development (EAFRD).

The uncultivated, hilly fields, on the other hand, see rare species of wild orchids grow, such as the endemic Serapias orientalis subsp. siciliensis, and Orchis italica.

== Accommodation facilities ==
The piana di Gela lowland is crossed by the Via Francigena Fabaria, a pilgrimage route which leads from the fortress of the Norman cathedral of Agrigento, continues along the coast to Gela and from there towards the piana di Lentini and the Simeto river, proceeding through natural parks such as the Oasi del Simeto, for a 300 km long walking path, overlooking the Mediterranean and towered over by the profile of Mount Etna.

The welcome committee "Via Fabaria - stages Gela, Niscemi and Caltagirone" is responsible for the signage, maintenance and cleaning of this area, and organizes the reception of pilgrims.

== Curiosities ==
In Geloi the Cicogna Days are organized, events during which volunteers of the Italian League for Bird Protection (LIPU) invite the participants to closely observe, without disturbing, the nesting of the white stork. These CicoDays represent the highlight of the LIPU section of Niscemi, which organizes walks, trekking, excursions, workshops and even bike rides.
