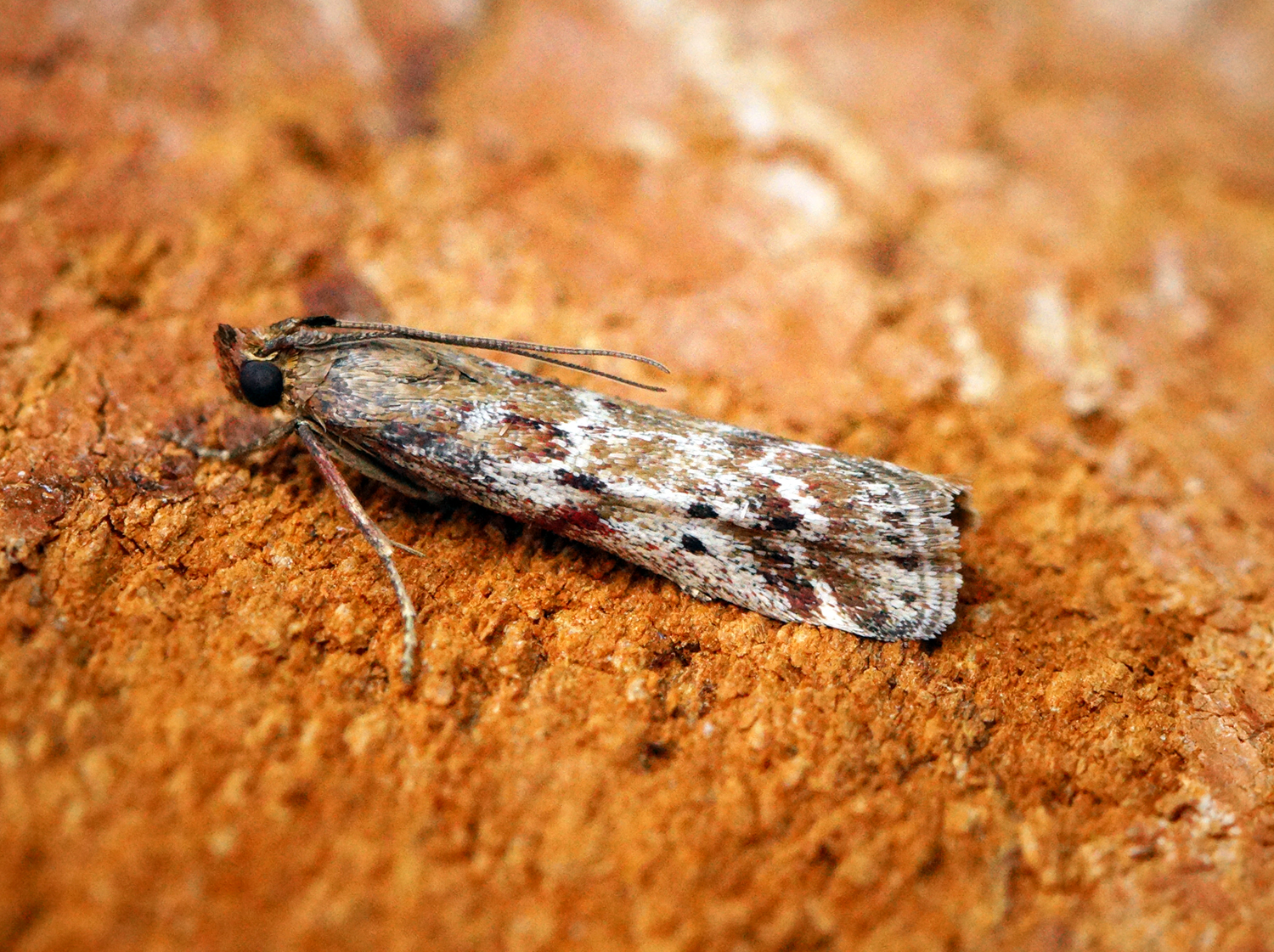

Scientific classification
- Kingdom: Animalia
- Phylum: Arthropoda
- Clade: Pancrustacea
- Class: Insecta
- Order: Lepidoptera
- Family: Pyralidae
- Genus: Delplanqueia
- Species: D. dilutella

Binomial name
- Delplanqueia dilutella (Denis & Schiffermuller, 1775)

Synonyms
- Tinea dilutella Denis & Schiffermüller, 1775; Pempeliella dilutella; Phycis adornatella Treitschke, 1835; Pempelia diffusa Staudinger, 1881; Phycis diluta Haworth, 1811; Phycis dilutalis Hübner, 1825; Tinea dilutella Hubner, 1796; Pempelia integella Staudinger, 1859; Pempelia integrella Wocke, 1871; Pempelia serpylletorum Zeller, 1839; Phycis subornatella Duponchel, 1837; Pempelia dilutella magna Amsel, 1954; Pempelia dilutella f. extincta Müller-Rutz, 1920; Pempelia dilutella omonlunella Roesler, 1970

= Delplanqueia dilutella =

Species of moth

Delplanqueia dilutella is a species of moth in the family Pyralidae. It was described by Michael Denis and Ignaz Schiffermüller in 1775. It is found in most of Europe (except Norway), east to Russia, Turkey, Iran and Mongolia.

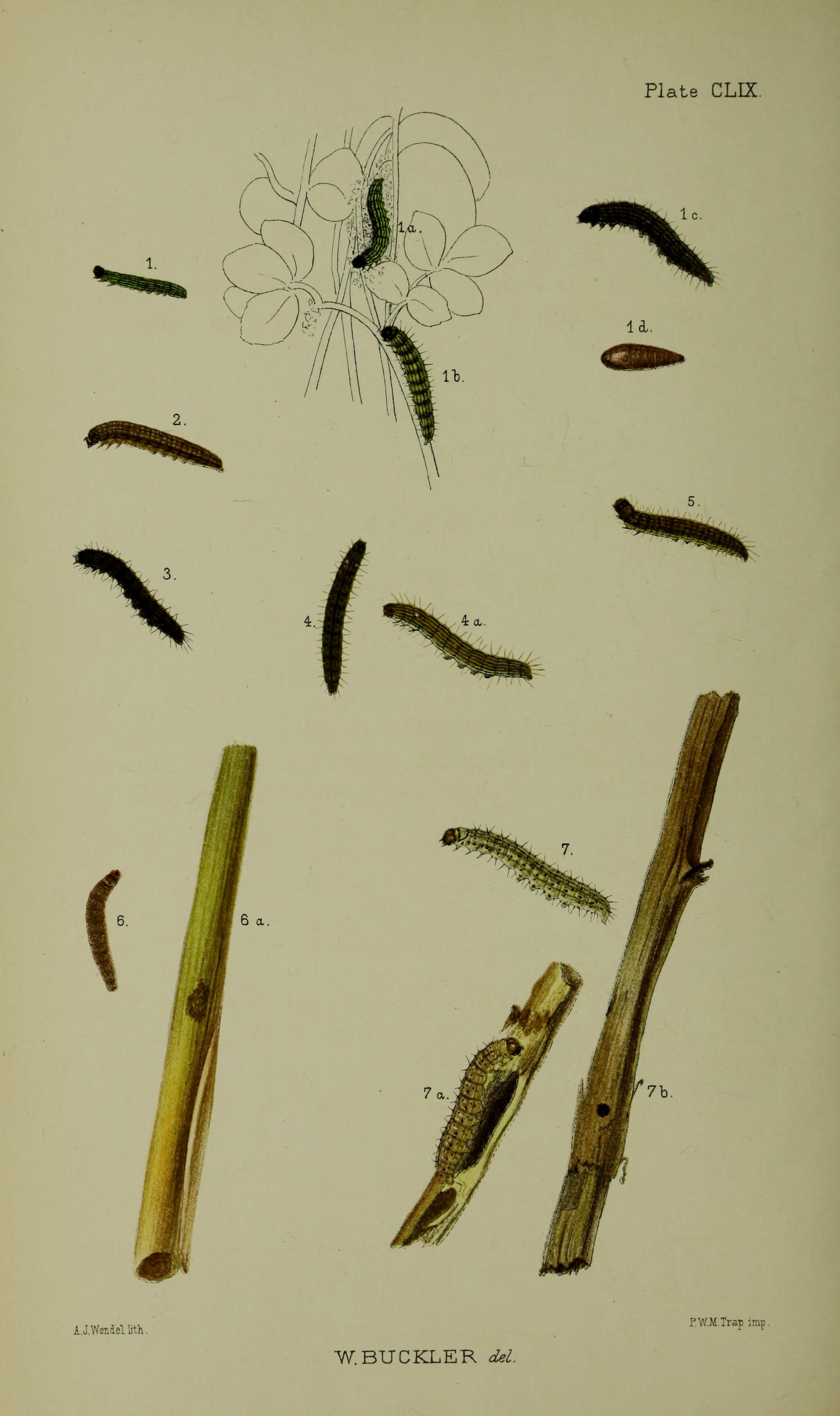
Fig. 3 larva after final moult

The wingspan is 18–26 mm. The forewings are ferruginous-ochreous, more or less suffusedly mixed with dull crimson and sometimes in disc with blackish; costal half and sometimes a subbasal fascia suffusedly mixed with white; lines whitish, first dark-edged posteriorly, second on both sides; two black transversely placed discal dots; some indistinct blackish terminal dots. Hindwings fuscous or light fuscous, darker terminally. The larva isgreenish-grey, dorsally yellowish-tinged; dorsal and subdorsal lines darker; head and plate of 2 black: in silken galleries amongst Thymus

Adults are on wing from May to June in one generation per year.

The larvae feed on Thymus serpyllum, Thymus drucei and Polygala species.
