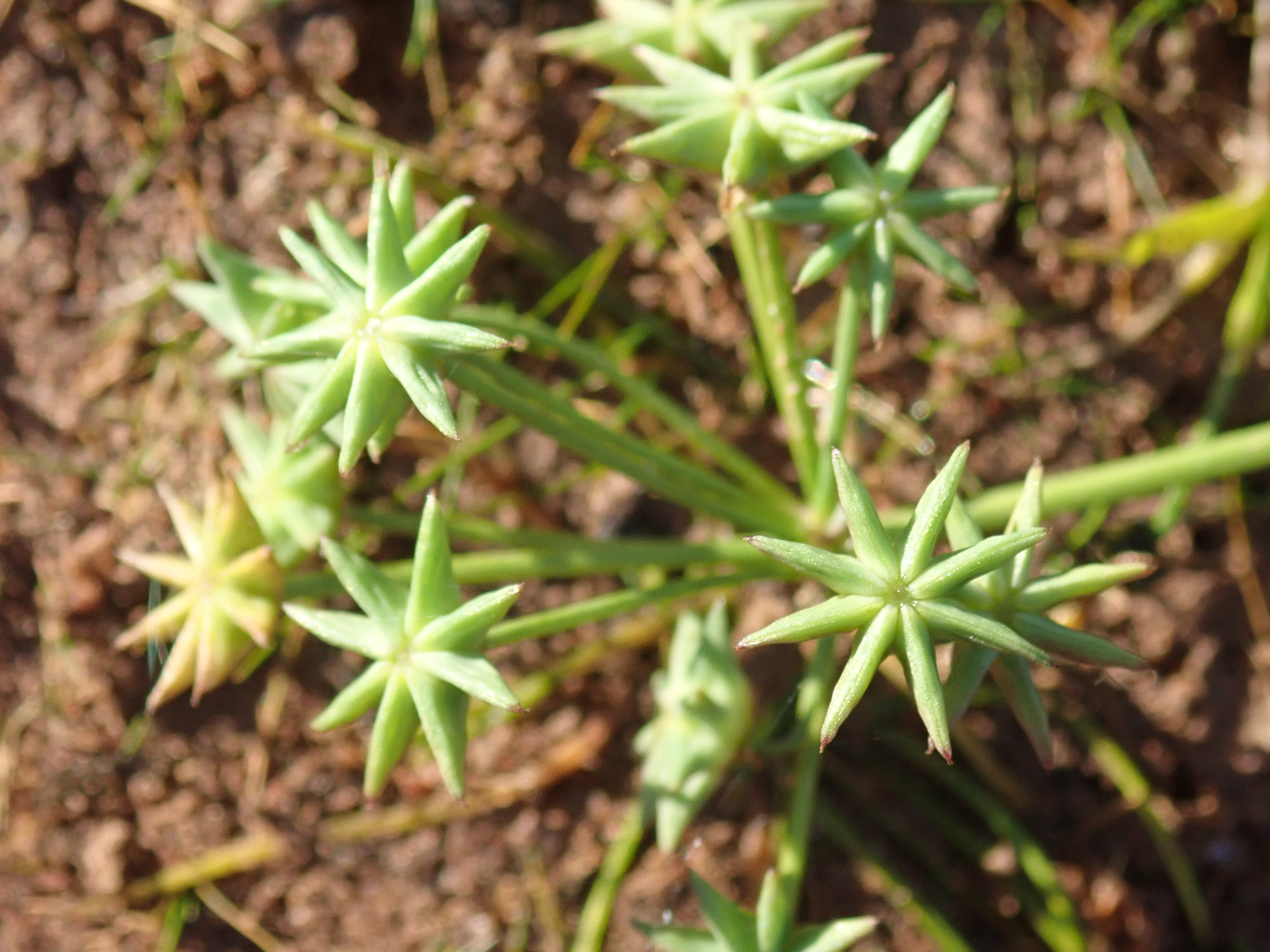

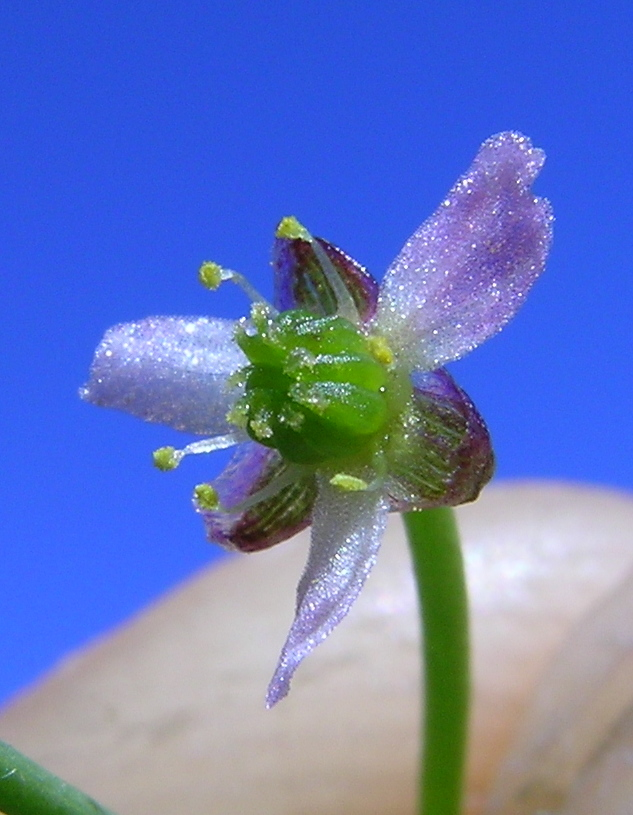

Scientific classification
- Kingdom: Plantae
- Clade: Tracheophytes
- Clade: Angiosperms
- Clade: Monocots
- Order: Alismatales
- Family: Alismataceae
- Genus: Damasonium
- Species: D. minus

Binomial name
- Damasonium minus (R.Br.) Buchenau

Synonyms
- Damasonium australe Salisb. (nom. illeg.) nom. superfl.

= Damasonium minus =

Species of aquatic plant

Damasonium minus is a species of flowering plant in the water-plantain family known by the common names starfruit and star-fruit (not to be confused with the cultivated starfruit). It is native to Australia, where it occurs everywhere except the Northern Territory. It is perhaps best known as an agricultural weed. It is a major weed of Australian rice crops.

This species is an emergent aquatic plant. It is an annual or short-lived perennial herb growing up to a meter tall. The floating or emergent leaves have blades up to 10 centimeters long by 4 wide and lance-shaped to heart-shaped. They are borne on petioles up to 30 centimeters long. The branching inflorescence has whorls of flowers. Each flower has tiny green sepals and white or pink petals a few millimeters long. The star-shaped aggregate fruit is made up of follicles containing seeds.

This plant grows in habitat with slow-moving and still water, such as swamps.

In agriculture, this plant has been called "the most important broadleaf weed in the Australian rice crop." Most rice is grown in Victoria and New South Wales. This weed has been controlled with the herbicide bensulfuron-methyl, but it has become less effective as herbicide-resistant strains have evolved. A pathogenic fungus, Rhynchosporium alismatis, was discovered on the plant, and it has become an option for biological control as a mycoherbicide. The fungus causes chlorosis and necrosis of the leaves on the mature plant and stunting of immature individuals. If immature weeds in a paddy are stunted, the rice plants may have a competitive advantage. The fungus can kill seedlings, and if it infects the inflorescence of the weed it can reduce seed weight and viability. The fungus can also help control another rice weed, Alisma lanceolatum.
