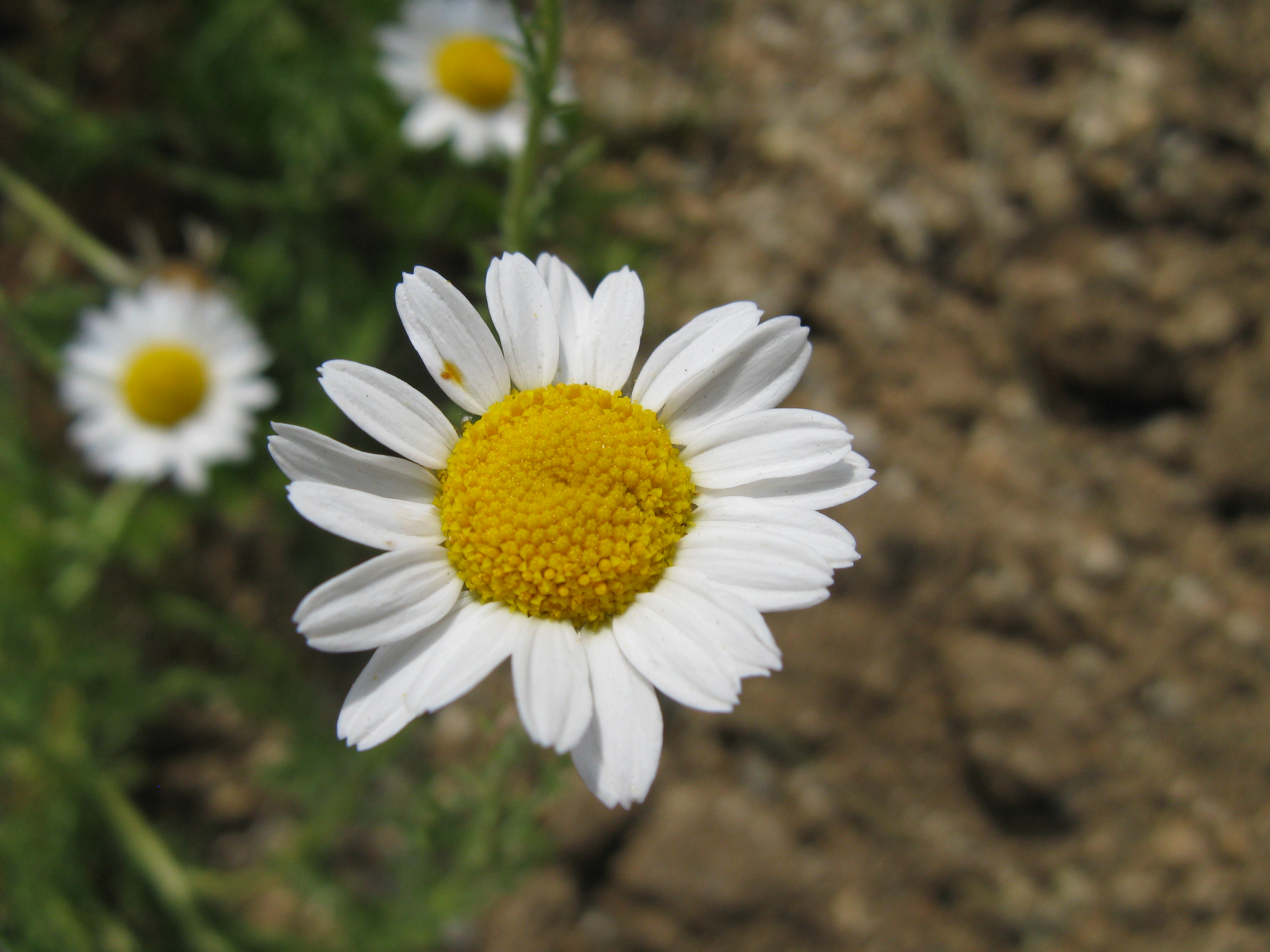
- Roman chamomile Chamaemelum nobile

Scientific classification
- Kingdom: Plantae
- Clade: Embryophytes
- Clade: Tracheophytes
- Clade: Spermatophytes
- Clade: Angiosperms
- Clade: Eudicots
- Clade: Asterids
- Order: Asterales
- Family: Asteraceae
- Subfamily: Asteroideae
- Tribe: Anthemideae
- Genus: Chamaemelum; Mill. 1754 not Vis. 1845

Type species
- Chamaemelum nobile (L.) All.

Synonyms
- Ormenis (Cass.) Cass.; Perideraea Webb; Marcelia Cass.

= Chamaemelum =

Genus of flowering plants

Chamaemelum is a small genus of plants in the daisy family commonly known as chamomiles or dogfennels. Perhaps the best-known species is Roman chamomile, Chamaemelum nobile. These are annual or perennial herbs, rarely exceeding half a meter in height and usually bearing solitary white daisylike flowers with yellow centers. They are native to Europe but most species can be found scattered in other continents where they have been introduced. The genus consists of only two species and is of the Asteraceae family.

== Species ==
- Chamaemelum fuscatum (Brot.) Vasc. – dusky dogfennel – Spain, France, Italy, Portugal, Channel Islands (UK), Malta, Tunisia, Algeria, Morocco
- Chamaemelum nobile (L.) All. – Roman chamomile – much of Europe, Western Asia, and North Africa from Azores + Ireland to Algeria + Kazakhstan
