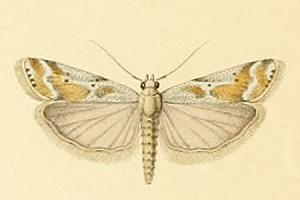

Scientific classification
- Kingdom: Animalia
- Phylum: Arthropoda
- Class: Insecta
- Order: Lepidoptera
- Family: Pyralidae
- Genus: Delplanqueia
- Species: D. cortella

Binomial name
- Delplanqueia cortella (Constant, 1884)

Synonyms
- Pempelia cortella Constant, 1884; Pempeliella cortella

= Delplanqueia cortella =

Species of moth

Delplanqueia cortella is a species of moth in the family Pyralidae. It was described by Alexandre Constant in 1884. It is found in Italy and on Sardinia and Corsica.

The wingspan is 22–24 mm.
