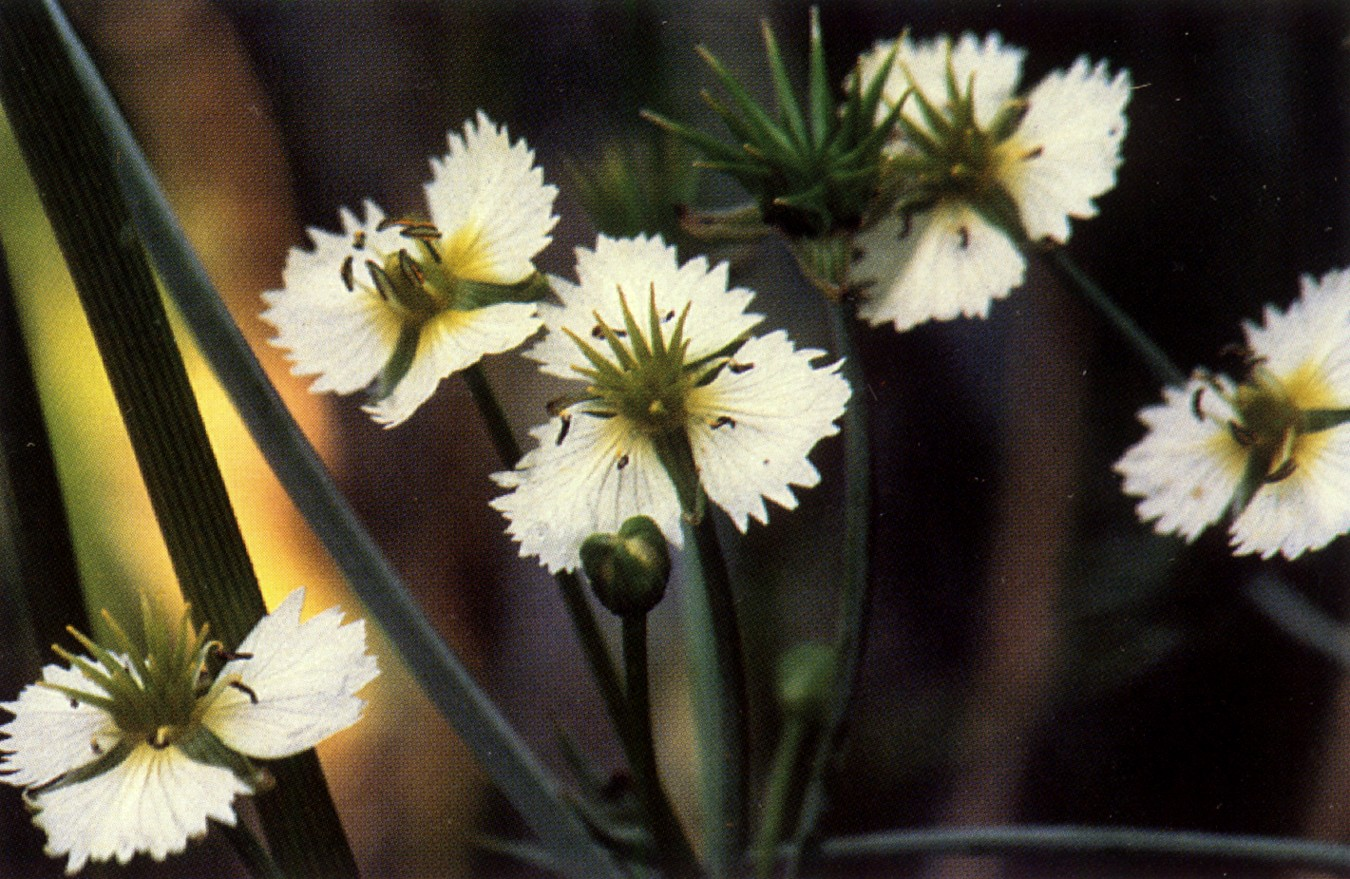

Conservation status
- Apparently Secure (NatureServe)

Scientific classification
- Kingdom: Plantae
- Clade: Tracheophytes
- Clade: Angiosperms
- Clade: Monocots
- Order: Alismatales
- Family: Alismataceae
- Genus: Damasonium
- Species: D. californicum

Binomial name
- Damasonium californicum Torr. ex Benth.

Synonyms
- Alisma californicum Micheli; Machaerocarpus californicus (Torr. ex Benth.) Small

= Damasonium californicum =

Species of aquatic plant

Damasonium californicum is a species of perennial wildflower in the water plantain family which is known by the common name fringed water-plantain, or star water-plantain.

D. californicum is a plant of wet environments in the western United States including Washington state, Oregon, northern California, Idaho, Nevada, and Montana. It is a resident of ponds, riversides, and vernal pools.

This is a tough-stemmed plant which may live submersed in water or erect on mud or moist soils. It grows to 20–45 centimeters (8–17 1/2 inches) above water. It has narrow basal leaves consisting of a thin blade, 2.5–7.5 cm (1–3 in) long, at the end of a long petiole. The inflorescence yields a flower at the end of each of several long peduncles. The flower has three white or pink petals, each with toothed or fringed ends and sometimes a yellow spot at the base. At the center are six short stamens. After the flower withers the narrow fruits within develop into flat, beaked achenes, several achenes gathered into a star-shaped bunch.
