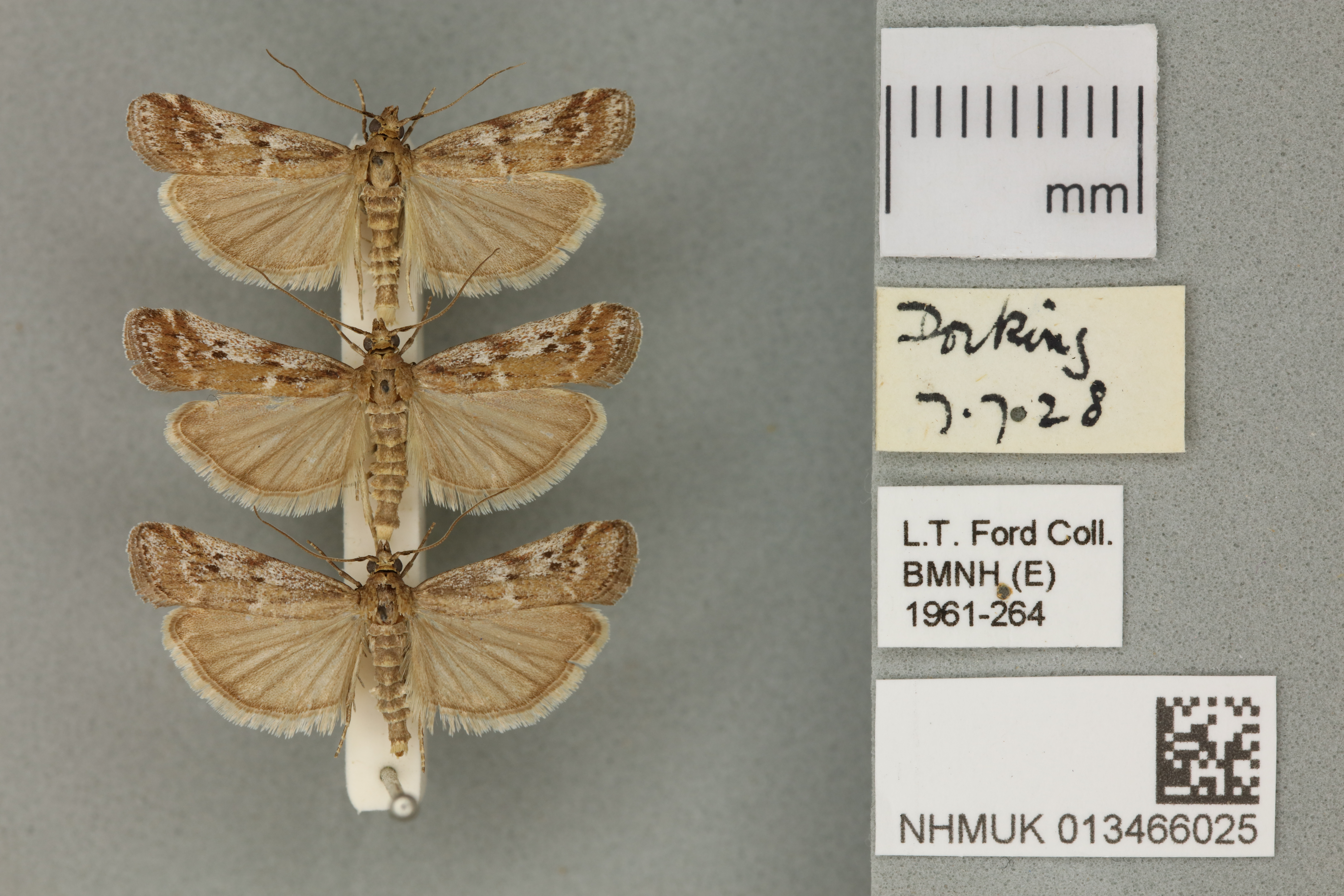

Scientific classification
- Domain: Eukaryota
- Kingdom: Animalia
- Phylum: Arthropoda
- Class: Insecta
- Order: Lepidoptera
- Family: Pyralidae
- Genus: Delplanqueia
- Species: D. inscriptella

Binomial name
- Delplanqueia inscriptella (Duponchel, 1836)

Synonyms
- Phycis inscriptella Duponchel, 1837; Pempeliella inscriptella

= Delplanqueia inscriptella =

Species of moth

Delplanqueia inscriptella is a species of moth in the family Pyralidae. It was described by Philogène Auguste Joseph Duponchel in 1836. It is found in France, Spain, the United Kingdom and Malta.
