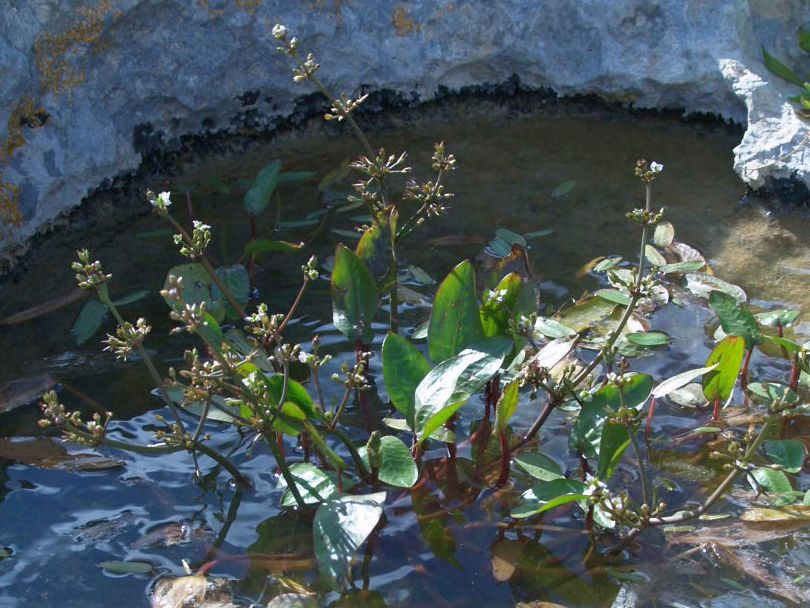

Conservation status
- Near Threatened (IUCN 3.1)

Scientific classification
- Kingdom: Plantae
- Clade: Tracheophytes
- Clade: Angiosperms
- Clade: Monocots
- Order: Alismatales
- Family: Alismataceae
- Genus: Damasonium
- Species: D. alisma

Binomial name
- Damasonium alisma Mill.

Synonyms
- Actinocarpus damasonium (L.) Sweet; Actinocarpus europaeus Spreng.; Actinocarpus maior Bercht. & J.Presl; Actinocarpus stellatus Bubani; Alisma damasonium L.; Alisma stellatum Lam.; Damasonium dalechampii Gray; Damasonium damasonium (L.) Asch. & Graebn.; Damasonium stellatum Thuill.; Damasonium vulgare Coss. & Germ.

= Damasonium alisma =

Starfruit

Species of aquatic plant

Damasonium alisma, commonly known as starfruit, is a species of flowering marsh plant. Its native range includes parts of Great Britain, France, Portugal, Spain, Italy, Greece, Russia, Ukraine, Moldova, and Kazakhstan.

Damasonium alisma is native to the British Isles and was at one time commonly found in south and central England. Numbers have declined as a result of the loss of pond habitats. It was not recorded in the wild in 2006 and is classified as endangered within the United Kingdom. Seeds from the (extinct) Headley Heath population were germinated in undisturbed ponds managed by Surrey Wildlife Trust in 2013, and have grown there each year since (at least up to 2018).

== Ecology ==
Damasonium alisma grows in acidic ponds. In Great Britain it went into decline along with the village pond. It once grew in many English counties from Sussex north to Shropshire, but by 1900 was reduced to two ponds in Buckinghamshire and one in Surrey. It is gradually starting to make a comeback due to intense conservation efforts. It requires open, well-lit, shallow water to grow in and regularly churned-up mud for its seeds to germinate.

It is very variable in form according to the depth of the water it is growing in. Dwarf plants with aerial leaves occur growing sub-terrestrially on mud. The number of ovules vary. Usually there are two in each carpel, but carpels with four to many occur over the range. Multi-ovulate forms from southwestern Europe and Sicily were originally described as D. polyspermum.

The shape of the follicles depends on the number of seeds; the beak (empty upper part) of the carpel is elongated in two-seeded plants, whereas in many-seeded plants the seeds occupy more of the follicle and the beak is relatively shorter and less well defined.

== Taxonomy ==
It was first described by Carl Linnaeus as Alisma damasonium in 1753, but was assigned to the genus, Damasonium, in 1768 by Philip Miller.
