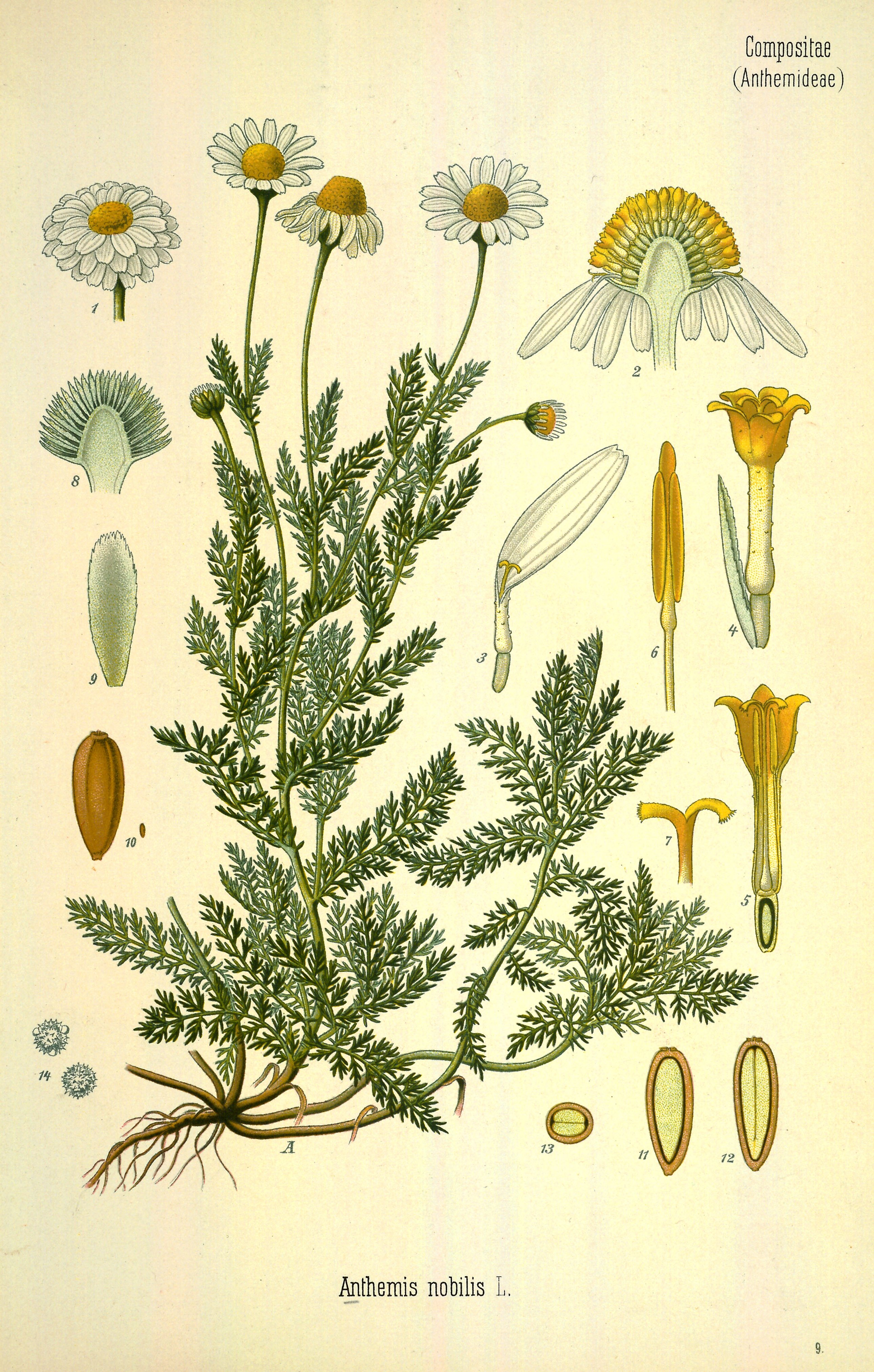
- Chamaemelum nobile

Conservation status
- Least Concern (IUCN 3.1)

Scientific classification
- Kingdom: Plantae
- Clade: Tracheophytes
- Clade: Angiosperms
- Clade: Eudicots
- Clade: Asterids
- Order: Asterales
- Family: Asteraceae
- Genus: Chamaemelum
- Species: C. nobile

Binomial name
- Chamaemelum nobile (L.) All.

Synonyms
- Anthemis nobilis L.

= Chamaemelum nobile =

Chamomile

Species of plants

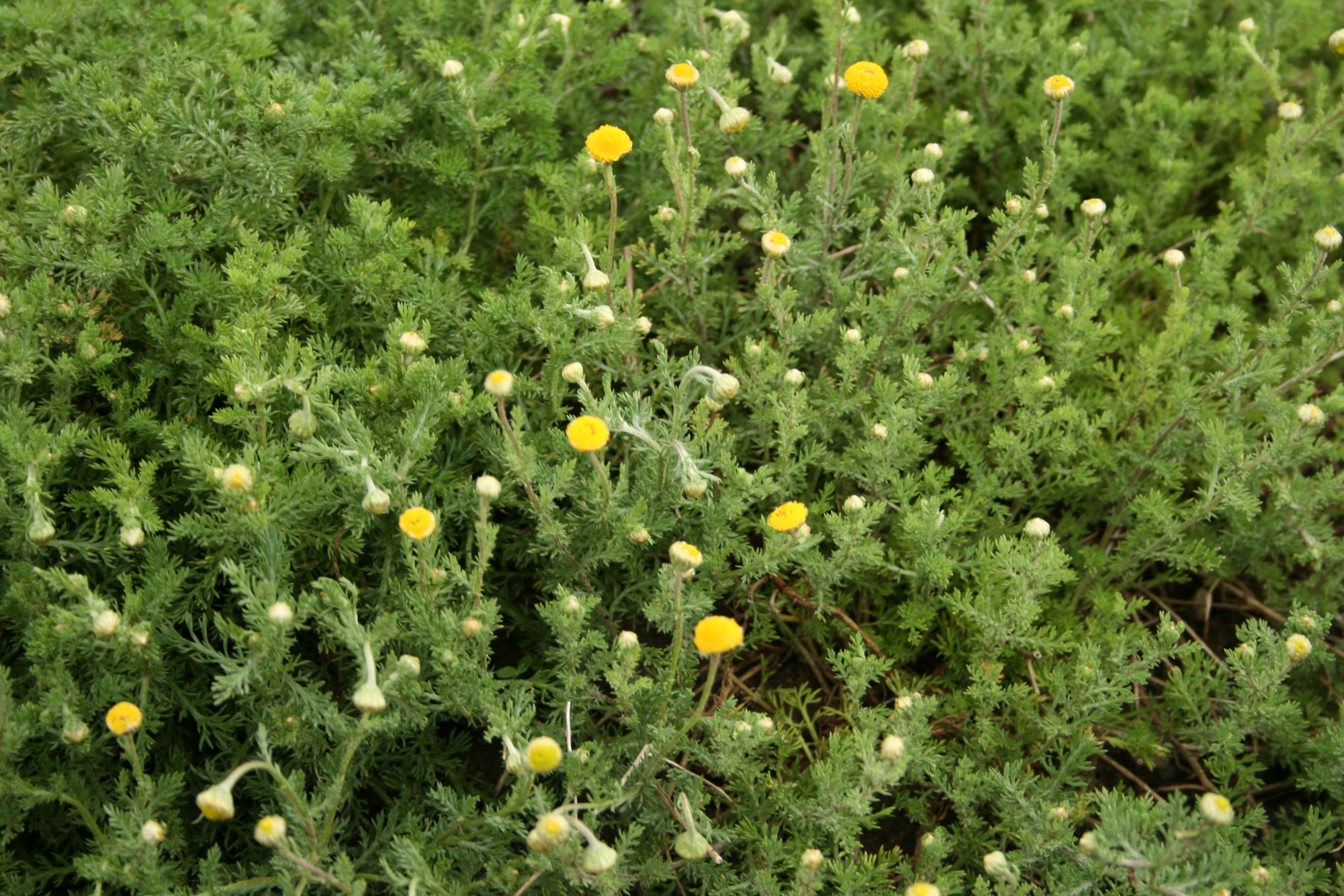
Cultivated C. nobile at the Botanischer Garten Mainz

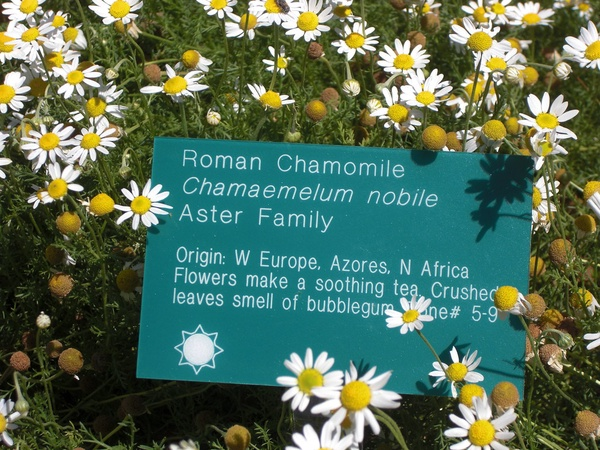
Roman chamomile

Chamaemelum nobile, commonly known as chamomile (also spelled camomile), is a low perennial plant found in dry fields and around gardens and cultivated grounds in Europe, North America, and South America. Its synonym is Anthemis nobilis, with various common names, such as Roman chamomile, English chamomile, garden chamomile, ground apple, low chamomile, mother's daisy or whig plant.

C. nobile is one source of the herbal product known as chamomile using dried flowers for flavoring teas or as a fragrance used in aromatherapy. Chamomile has no established medicinal properties.

== Description ==
Chamaemelum nobile has daisy-like white flowers and procumbent stems; the leaves are alternate, bipinnate, finely dissected, and downy to glabrous. The solitary, terminal flowerheads, rising 20–30 cm (8–12 in) above the ground, consist of prominent yellow disk flowers and silver-white ray flowers. The flowering time in the Northern Hemisphere is June and July, and its fragrance is sweet, crisp, fruity and herbaceous.

Although the plant is often confused with German chamomile (Matricaria chamomilla), its morphology, properties and chemical composition are markedly different.

== Etymology ==
The word chamomile and the genus name Chamaemelum derive from the Greek χαμαίμηλον (chamaimēlon), "earth-apple", from χαμαί (chamai), "on the ground" + μήλον (mēlon), "apple", so-called because of the apple-like scent of the plant.

The plant obtained the name "nobile" (Latin "noble" NEU) because of its putative therapeutic properties, which were thought to be better than those of the German chamomile (Matricaria chamomilla L.).

== Distribution ==
Roman chamomile is native to Western Europe and the northwestern Maghreb, but has been introduced to a variety of areas outside its native range, where it has become naturalised. Its native range includes the United Kingdom, Ireland, France, Spain, Portugal, Morocco, Algeria and the Azores. In Great Britain, it grows wild in Southern England and portions of Wales – primarily in Cornwall, Dartmoor, the New Forest and the Welsh coastline – with populations found north of Derbyshire considered to be naturalised.

== Conservation ==
Chamaemelum nobile is listed as least concern on the Red List but the plant population trend in the UK is decreasing at a significant rate. This decline in the Chamaemelum nobile population was caused by the drainage of wet grasslands, decrease in grazing, and the reduction of pasture that was used as arable fields. There is speculation that wild plant collecting may also be a cause of this species population decline.

Although the species population is declining there are a few plants placed in at least one land and water protected area. There is no educational awareness program, international legislation, or international management for this species.

== Adverse effects ==
Chamomile is likely unsafe for use during pregnancy, and its topical use for skin disorders may cause contact dermatitis. Consuming chamomile tea may adversely affect anticoagulant drugs.

== Uses ==
Extracts or dried flowers of Chamaemelum nobile are used in hair care and skincare products. The plant may be used to flavor foods and in herbal teas, perfumes, and cosmetics. It is used in aromatherapy in the assumption that it is a calming agent to reduce stress and promote sleep. Chamomile essential oil contains sesquiterpenes, terpene lactones (including the blue compound chamazulene), acetylene derivatives, and polyphenols, which contribute to the fragrance and may be extracted individually.

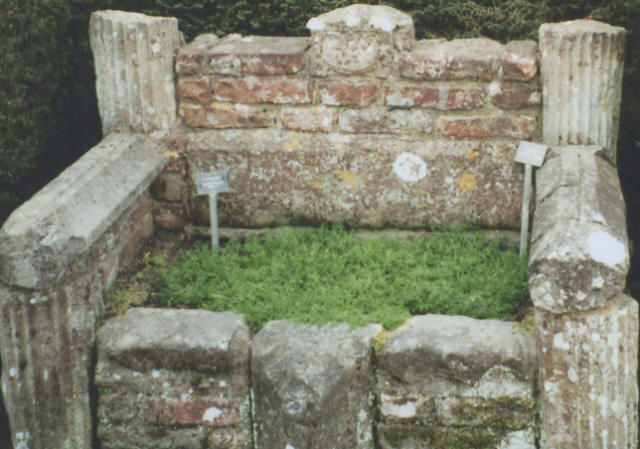
Fragrant herb seat in Sissinghurst Castle Garden, United Kingdom

Chamomile can be planted as a fragrant chamomile lawn. A chamomile lawn needs light soil, adequate moisture, and sun to thrive. Each square meter contains 83–100 plants. The lawn is only suitable for light foot traffic; stepping-stones can be set into the lawn if more traffic is needed (with at least 10 cm between them to allow the chamomile to grow). Because they do not need mowing, they are often used in places where mower access is difficult, though trimming may help make it denser. If a flowering variety is used, it will need to be deadheaded, so non-flowering varieties are lower-maintenance. Dwarf varieties are also commonly used. Chamomile lawns were popular in England in the reign of Elizabeth I (1558-1603). Chamomile seats, smaller raised areas of fragrant lawn meant to be sat upon, were also popular, and are still used as garden features. There is a chamomile seat in the Queen's Garden at Kew Gardens. Herb seats planted with other species, such as creeping thyme, also exist.

=== Folk medicine ===
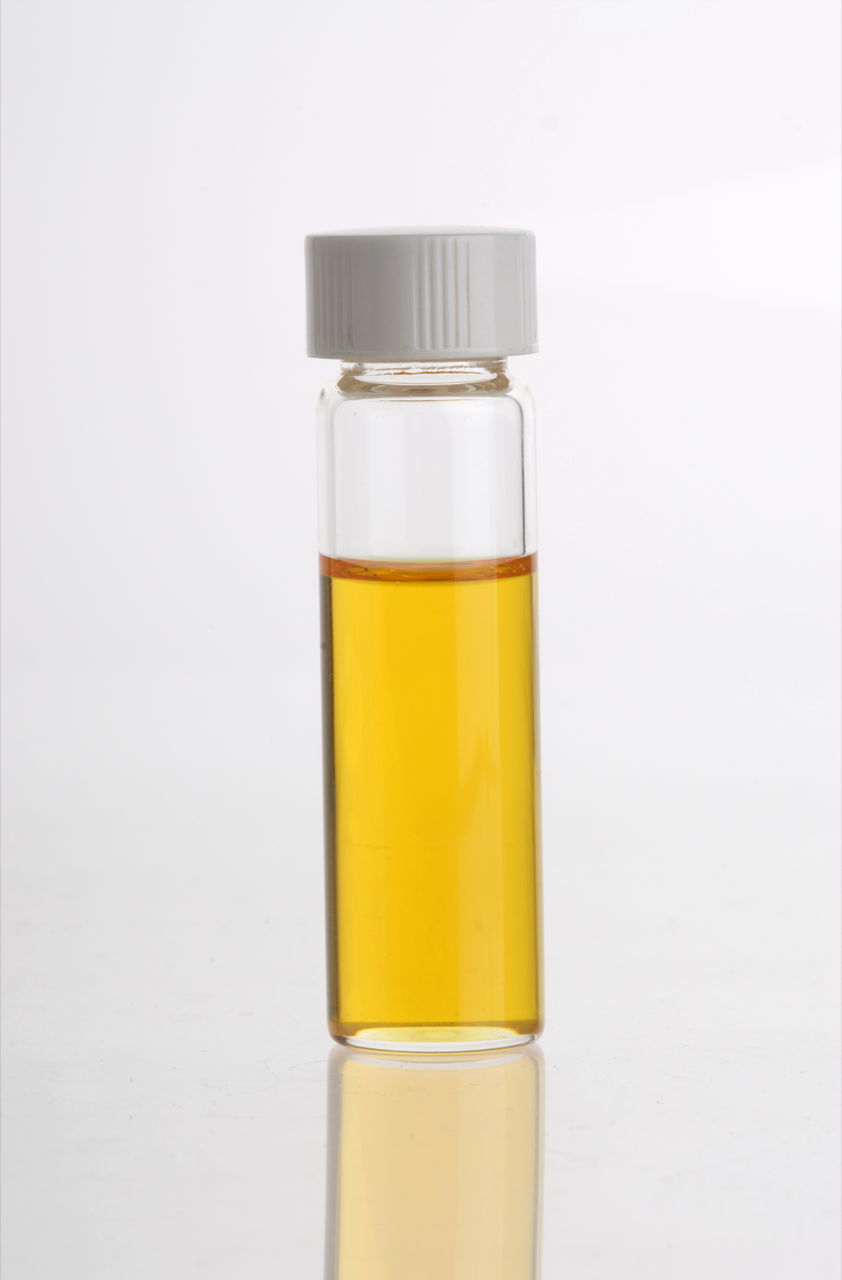
Roman chamomile (Chamaemelum nobile) essential oil

Although used in folk medicine, there are no studies confirming its medicinal efficacy. Alternative medicine practices approved in Germany include use of chamomile as a topical medication or inhalant for mouth and respiratory tract irritations.

== In culture ==
Roman chamomile (C. nobile L.) has a history of use in traditional medicine since the Middle Ages. The European cultivation of the plant started in England in the 16th century. Its fragrant smell and soft leaves made it popular with Elizabethan gardeners, and the plant became a mainstay of herb gardens across the British Isles. C. nobile was listed first in the pharmacopoeia of Würtenberg as a carminative, painkiller, diuretic and digestive aid. Joachim Camerarius was the first to discover and name chamaemelum nobile in 1598 in Rome. In Egypt, chamaemelum nobile was used as a symbol of dedication to their gods.

The plant has diverse common names, among which Roman chamomile or sweet chamomile are used during the 21st century.
