= Delplanqueia nobilella =

Scientific classification
- Domain: Eukaryota
- Kingdom: Animalia
- Phylum: Arthropoda
- Class: Insecta
- Order: Lepidoptera
- Family: Pyralidae
- Genus: Delplanqueia
- Species: D. nobilella

Binomial name
- Delplanqueia nobilella (Ragonot, 1887)

Synonyms
- Nephopteryx nobilella Ragonot, 1887

Species of moth

Delplanqueia nobilella is a species of moth in the family Pyralidae. It was described by Émile Louis Ragonot in 1887. It is found in Turkmenistan.
