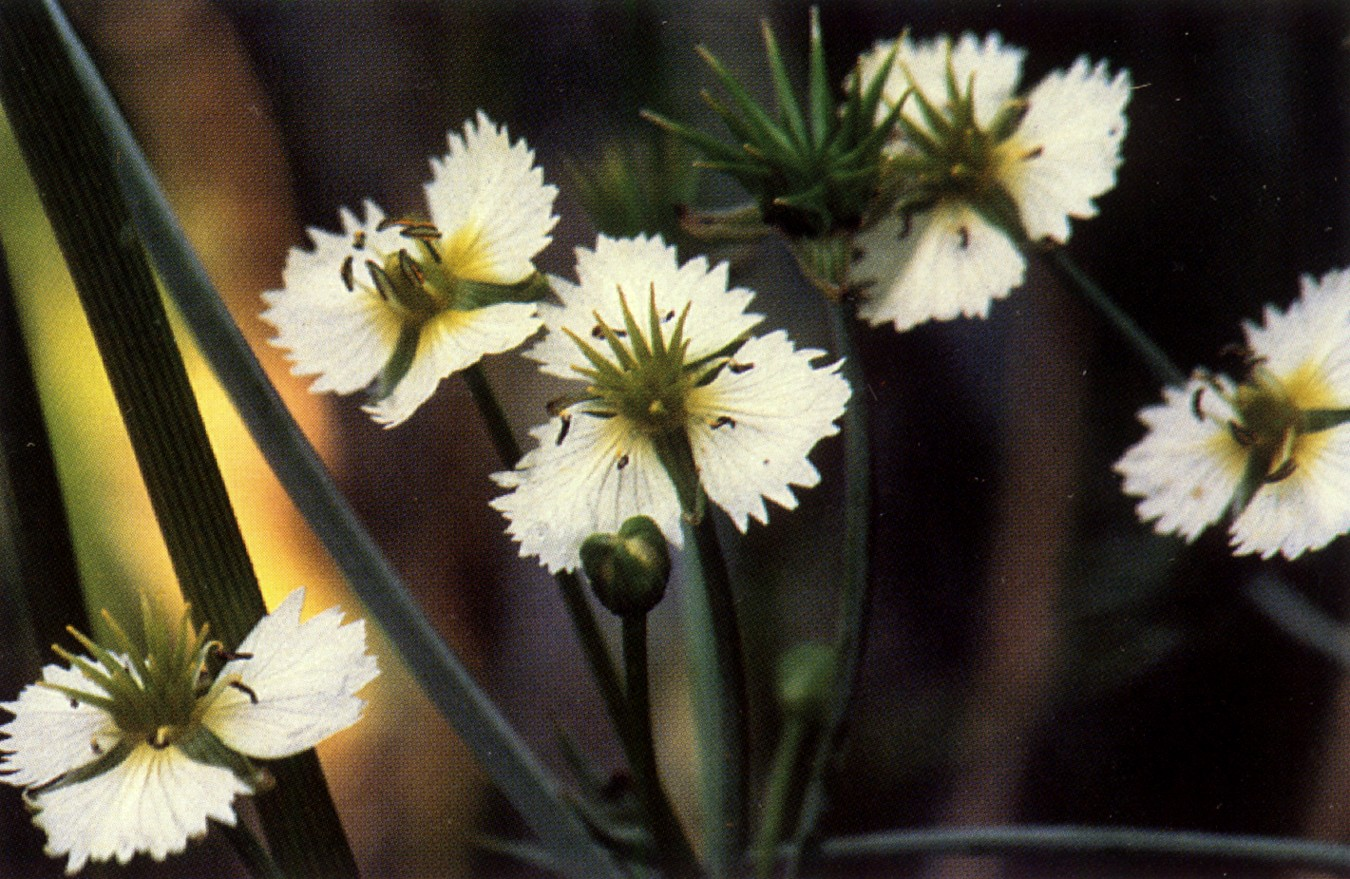
- Damasonium californicum
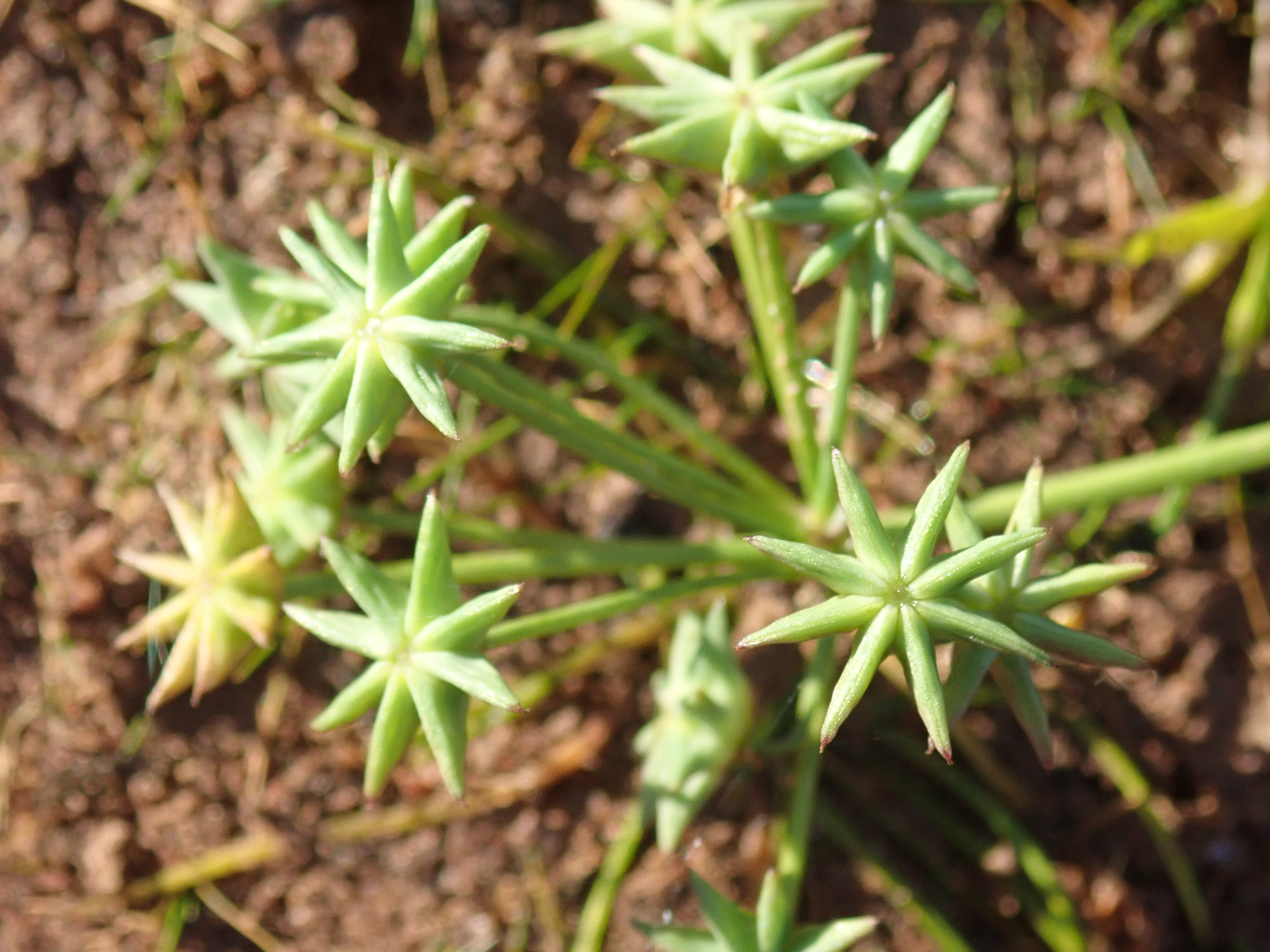
- Damasonium minus (fruit)

Scientific classification
- Kingdom: Plantae
- Clade: Tracheophytes
- Clade: Angiosperms
- Clade: Monocots
- Order: Alismatales
- Family: Alismataceae
- Genus: Damasonium; Mill.

Species
- See text

= Damasonium =

Starfruit

Genus of aquatic plants

Damasonium is a genus of six species of flowering plants in the family Alismataceae, commonly known as starfruit and by the older name thrumwort. The genus has a subcosmopolitan but very patchy distribution.

They are aquatic perennial herbaceous plants growing in shallow water or mud beside ponds. The leaves are all basal, floating, or aerial in plants on pond margins. The flowers are hermaphrodite, in one to many whorls, in umbels, racemes or panicles; they have six stamens, and six to nine carpels arranged in a whorl, connate at the base, each with two to many ventral ovules; The styles are terminal. The fruit is a whorl of follicles; the follicles are laterally compressed, radiating in stellate fashion, with a more or less elongated apical beak.

== Taxonomy ==
The genus was first described by Philip Miller in 1754. No type species was designated.

== Species ==
As of May 2014, there are six accepted species:

- Damasonium alisma Mill. (syn. D. stellatum Thuill.; D. polyspermum Cosson; D. constrictum Juz.). - Great Britain, France, Portugal, Spain, Italy, Greece, Russia, Ukraine, Moldova, Kazakhstan
- Damasonium bourgaei Coss. - Mediterranean Basin and India
- Damasonium californicum Torr. ex Benth. - western United States (Idaho, Oregon, Nevada, California, Montana, Washington state)
- Damasonium constrictum Juz. - Kazakhstan and Altay region of Siberia
- Damasonium minus (R. Br.) Buchenau (syn. D. australe Salisb.). Australia.
- Damasonium polyspermum Coss. - Spain, France, Portugal, Greece, Sicily, Algeria, Libya, Morocco
