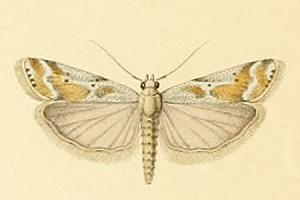
- Delplanqueia cortella

Scientific classification
- Kingdom: Animalia
- Phylum: Arthropoda
- Class: Insecta
- Order: Lepidoptera
- Family: Pyralidae
- Subfamily: Phycitinae
- Tribe: Phycitini
- Genus: Delplanqueia; Leraut, 2001

= Delplanqueia =

Genus of moths

Delplanqueia is a genus of snout moths. It was described by Patrice J.A. Leraut in 2001.

== Species ==
- Delplanqueia cortella (Constant, 1884)
- Delplanqueia dilutella (Denis & Schiffermuller, 1775)
- Delplanqueia enderleini (Rebel, 1934)
- Delplanqueia inscriptella (Duponchel, 1836)
- Delplanqueia nobilella (Ragonot, 1887)
