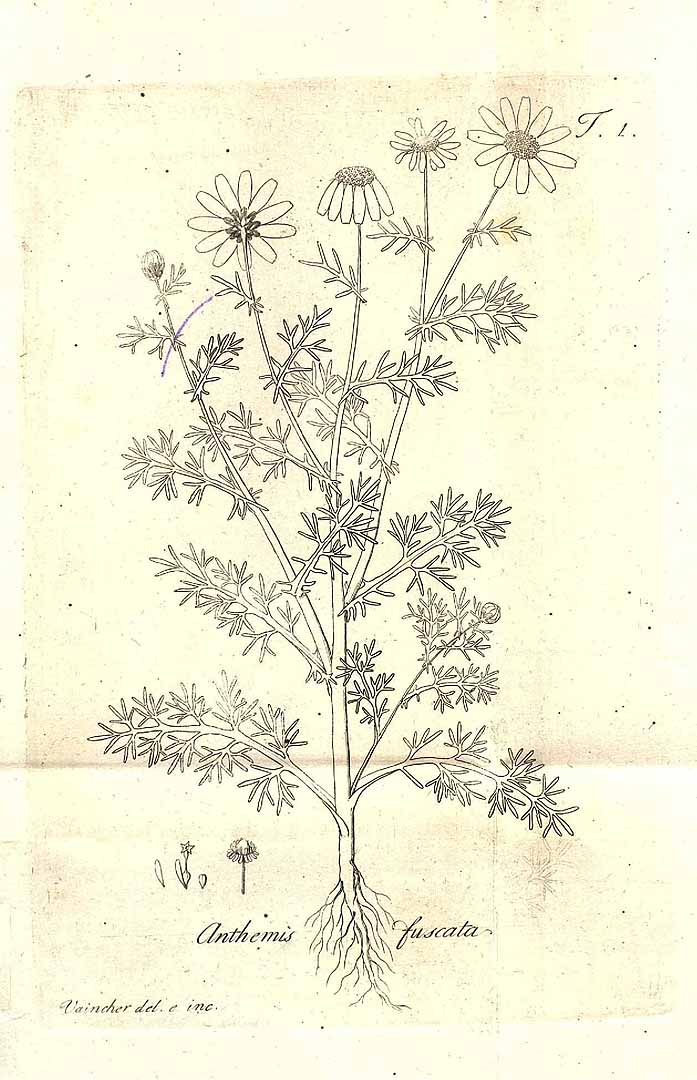

Scientific classification
- Kingdom: Plantae
- Clade: Tracheophytes
- Clade: Angiosperms
- Clade: Eudicots
- Clade: Asterids
- Order: Asterales
- Family: Asteraceae
- Genus: Chamaemelum
- Species: C. fuscatum

Binomial name
- Chamaemelum fuscatum (Brot.) Vasc.

Synonyms
- Anthemis fuscata Brot.; Chamomilla fuscata (Brot.) Gren. & Godr.; Maruta fuscata (Brot.) DC.; Perideraea fuscata (Brot.) Webb

= Chamaemelum fuscatum =

Flowering chamomile plant species

Chamaemelum fuscatum, commonly known as dusky dogfennel or dark chamomile, is an annual herb in the family Asteraceae, native to Europe and introduced to California.

C. fuscatum typically grows from 5 to 20 cm tall, but some specimens have reached over 35 cm. Leaves are pinnately divided and between 1 and 4 centimetres long. They are rounded into ellipses, with those closer to the stem sized smaller and more ovate. Like other members of the Asteraceae family, the flowers are actually composite flowers. The outer ray flowers are the largest at 8 to 15 mm long, while the inner disk flowers measure between 2.5 and 3 mm long. Both flowers produce similar-sized fruits and, in California, bloom between March and April.
