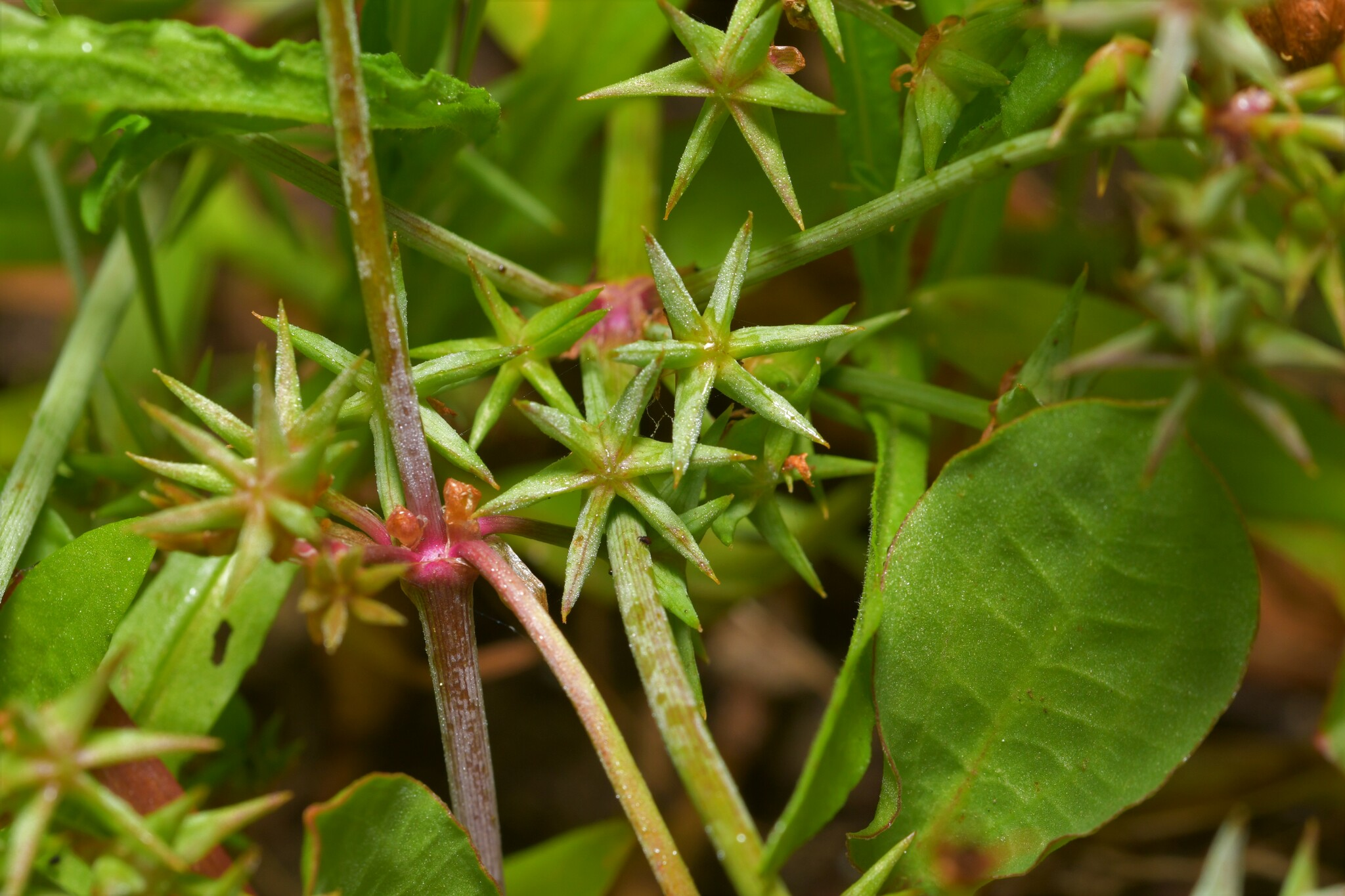
- In Portugal

Conservation status
- Least Concern (IUCN 3.1)

Scientific classification
- Kingdom: Plantae
- Clade: Tracheophytes
- Clade: Angiosperms
- Clade: Monocots
- Order: Alismatales
- Family: Alismataceae
- Genus: Damasonium
- Species: D. bourgaei

Binomial name
- Damasonium bourgaei Coss.

Synonyms
- Alisma bourgaei

= Damasonium bourgaei =

Species of plant

Damasonium bourgaei is a species of plant in the family Alismataceae.

== Distribution ==
Damasonium bourgaei has a scattered distribution in the Mediterranean Basin, occurring in Algeria, Cyprus, Egypt, Greece, Israel, Syria, Sicily and Sardinia, Malta, Morocco, Portugal, Spain, Tunisia, and India.

== Ecology ==
D. bourgaei is an amphibious annual plant associated with habitats that undergo seasonal changes in the water level, usually on nutrient-rich substrates. The species produces different types of leaves depending on the water depth, including grass-like submerged leaves, floating spoon-shaped leaves or, in its terrestrial phase, emergent lanceolate leaves.

Contrary to most other Damasonium species, the flowers of D. bourgeai have anthers that touch the carpels, facilitating self-pollination.
