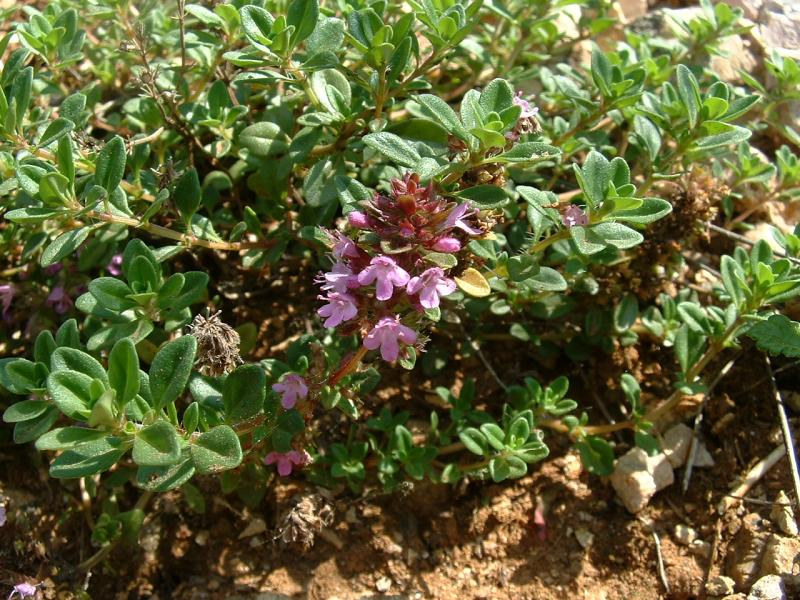

Scientific classification
- Kingdom: Plantae
- Clade: Embryophytes
- Clade: Tracheophytes
- Clade: Spermatophytes
- Clade: Angiosperms
- Clade: Eudicots
- Clade: Asterids
- Order: Lamiales
- Family: Lamiaceae
- Genus: Thymus
- Species: T. serpyllum

Binomial name
- Thymus serpyllum L.

Synonyms
- List: Cunila thymoides L.; Hedeoma thymoides (L.) Pers.; Origanum serpyllum (L.) Kuntze; Serpyllum angustifolium (Pers.) Fourr.; Serpyllum citriodora Pall.; Serpyllum vulgare Fourr.; Thymbra ciliata Ten. nom. illeg.; Thymus acicularis Besser nom. illeg.; Thymus adscendens Bernh. ex Link; Thymus affinis Vis.; Thymus albidus Opiz; Thymus angulosus Dulac; Thymus angustifolius Pers. nom. illeg.; Thymus angustifolius var. empetroides Wimm. & Grab.; Thymus angustifolius var. ericoides Wimm. & Grab.; Thymus angustifolius var. inolens Dumort.; Thymus angustifolius var. intermedius Becker; Thymus angustifolius var. linearifolius Wimm. & Grab.; Thymus angustifolius var. pycnotrichus Uechtr.; Thymus angustifolius var. rigidus Wimm. & Grab.; Thymus angustifolius var. silvicola Wimm. & Grab.; Thymus angustus Opiz ex Déségl.; Thymus apricus Opiz; Thymus aureus auct.; Thymus azoricus Lodd. nom. inval.; Thymus barbatus Opiz; Thymus beneschianus Opiz; Thymus borbasii Borbás; Thymus caespitosus var. castriferrei (Borbás) Soó; Thymus calcicolus Schur; Thymus campestris Salisb. nom. illeg.; Thymus carstiensis (Velen.) Ronniger; Thymus caucasicus Willd. ex Benth.; Thymus chamaedrys var. rotundifolius Nyman; Thymus ciliatus Lam.; Thymus citratus Dumort.; Thymus citriodorus Schreb.; Thymus communis Kitt.; Thymus concolor Opiz; Thymus dalmaticus var. carstiensis Velen.; Thymus decumbens Bernh. ex Rchb.; Thymus deflexus Benth.; Thymus elatus Schrad. ex Rchb.; Thymus ellipticus Heinr.Braun nom. illeg.; Thymus ellipticus Opiz; Thymus elongatus Opiz; Thymus erioclados Borbás; Thymus exserens Ehrh. ex Link; Thymus flogellicaulis A.Kern.; Thymus gizellae Borbás; Thymus glabrescens Benth. nom. illeg.; Thymus gratissimus Dufour ex Willk. & Lange; Thymus hackelianus Opiz; Thymus hausmannii Heinr.Braun; Thymus hornungianus Opiz; Thymus incanus Grossh. nom. illeg.; Thymus incanus Willd. ex Benth. nom. illeg.; Thymus includens Ehrh. ex Rchb.; Thymus inodorus Lej. nom. illeg.; Thymus interruptus Opiz; Thymus jaquetianus (Ronniger) M.Debray; Thymus kollmunzerianus Opiz ex Benth.; Thymus kratzmannianus Opiz; Thymus laevigatus Vahl; Thymus linearifolius Heinr.Braun; Thymus longistylus Opiz; Thymus lucidus Willd.; Thymus macrophyllus Heinr.Braun; Thymus majoranifolius Desf.; Thymus micranthus Wierzb. ex Opiz; Thymus minutus Opiz; Thymus muscosus Zaver.; Thymus oblongifolius Heinr.Braun nom. illeg.; Thymus ovatus var. concolor (Opiz) Formánek; Thymus ovatus var. subcitratus (Schreb.) Formánek; Thymus procerus Opiz ex Benth.; Thymus procumbens Benth. ex Opiz; Thymus pseudoserpyllum Rchb. ex Benth.; Thymus pulegioides var. jaquetianus Ronniger; Thymus pumilus Gueldenst. ex Ledeb.; Thymus pusillus Gueldenst. ex Ledeb.; Thymus pusio Dichtl; Thymus pycnotrichus (Uechtr.) Ronniger; Thymus radoi Borbás; Thymus raripilus Dichtl; Thymus reflexus Lej.; Thymus reichelianus Opiz; Thymus repens Gilib. nom. inval.; Thymus rigidulus Kerguélen; Thymus rigidus Rchb. ex Besser; Thymus rotundifolius Schur nom. illeg.; Thymus sanioi Borbás; Thymus serbicus Petrovic; Thymus serratus Opiz; Thymus simplex Kitt.; Thymus spathulatus var. castriferrei Borbás; Thymus subcitratus Schreb.; Thymus subhirsutus Borbás & Heinr.Braun; Thymus variabilis Hoffmanns. & Link; Thymus villosus Pall. ex M.Bieb. nom. illeg.; Thymus wierzbickianus Opiz; Thymus wondracekianus Opiz; Ziziphora thymoides (L.) Roem. & Schult.

= Thymus serpyllum =

Species of plant

Thymus serpyllum, known by the common names of Breckland thyme, Breckland wild thyme, wild thyme, creeping thyme, or elfin thyme, is a species of flowering plant in the mint family, Lamiaceae. It is a low, usually prostrate subshrub forming creeping stems up to 10 cm (4 in) tall. The oval evergreen leaves are up to 8 mm. The strongly scented flowers are either lilac, pink-purple, or magenta, are up to 6 mm long and produced in clusters.

The species is native to most of Europe and North Africa. The hardy plant tolerates some pedestrian traffic and produces odors ranging from heavily herbal to lightly lemon, depending on the variety.

== Description ==
Wild thyme is a creeping dwarf evergreen shrub, growing to 10 centimetres (4 in) tall. It has woody stems up to 10 cm long and a taproot. It forms matlike plants that root from the nodes of the squarish, limp stems. The leaves are 3–8 mm long in opposite pairs, nearly stalkless, with linear elliptic round-tipped blades and untoothed margins. The plant sends up erect flowering shoots in summer. The flowers are 4–6 mm long and usually pink or mauve, rarely white, with a tube-like calyx and an irregular straight-tubed, hairy corolla. The upper petal is notched and the lower one is larger than the two lateral petals and has three flattened lobes which form a lip. Each flower has four projecting stamens and two fused carpels. The fruit is a dry, four-chambered schizocarp.

=== Chemistry ===
The oils of T. serpyllum contain thymol, carvacrol, limonene, paracymene, gamma-terpinene and beta-caryophyllene.

== Distribution and habitat ==
Wild thyme is native to the Palearctic realm of Europe and Asia. It is a plant of thin soils and can be found growing on sandy-soiled heaths, rocky outcrops, hills, banks, roadsides and riverside sand banks.

== Ecology ==
Wild thyme is one of the plants on which both the common blue butterfly and large blue butterfly larvae feed and it is also attractive to bees.

== Cultivation ==
Creeping and mounding variants of T. serpyllum are used as border plants and ground cover around gardens and stone paths. It may also be used to replace a bluegrass lawn to xeriscape low to moderate foot traffic areas due to its tolerance for low water and poor soils.

Creeping thyme has also been used to "upholster" herb seats, similar to camomile seats, and provide a fragrant surface to sit on.

Several cultivars have been produced, of which 'Pink Chintz' has gained the Royal Horticultural Society's Award of Garden Merit. A miniature creeping form is 'Elfin'.

== Uses ==
Wild thyme can be used as a herb much as domestic thyme, with a milder flavor.

== Gallery ==
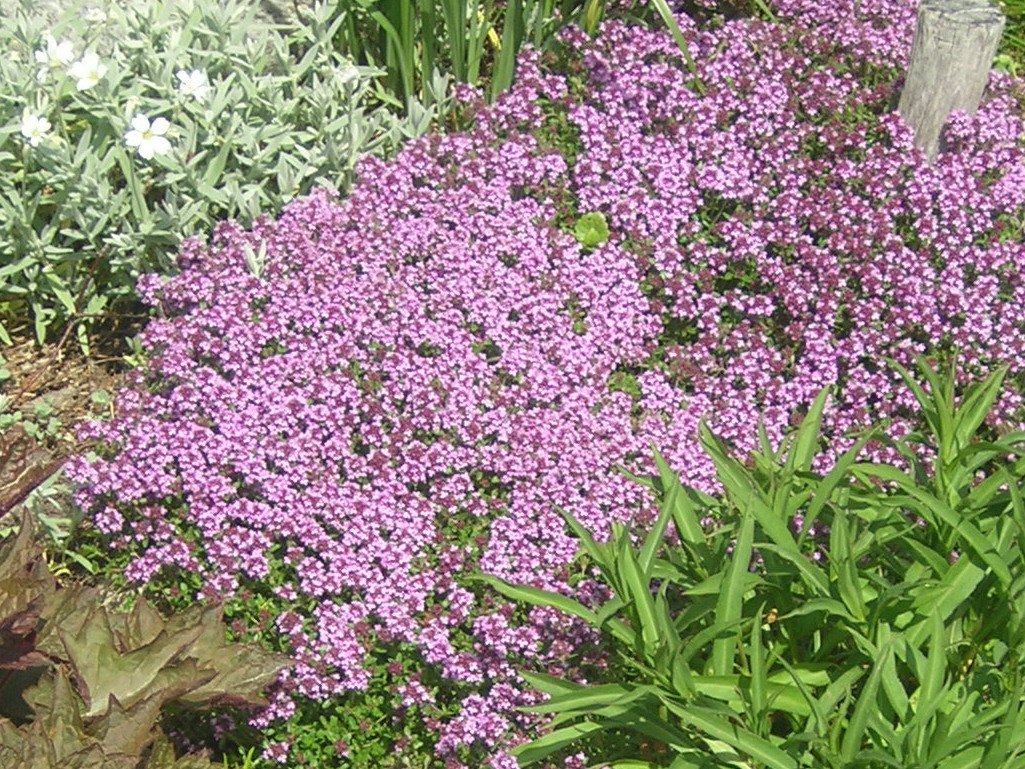

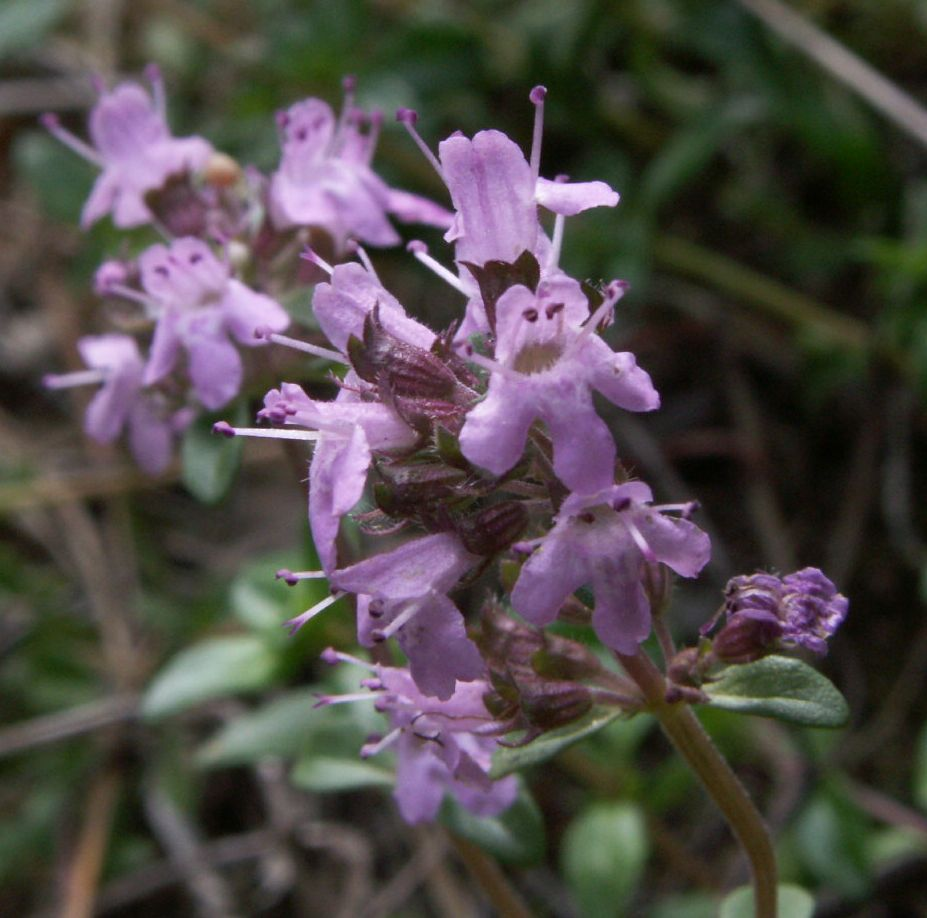

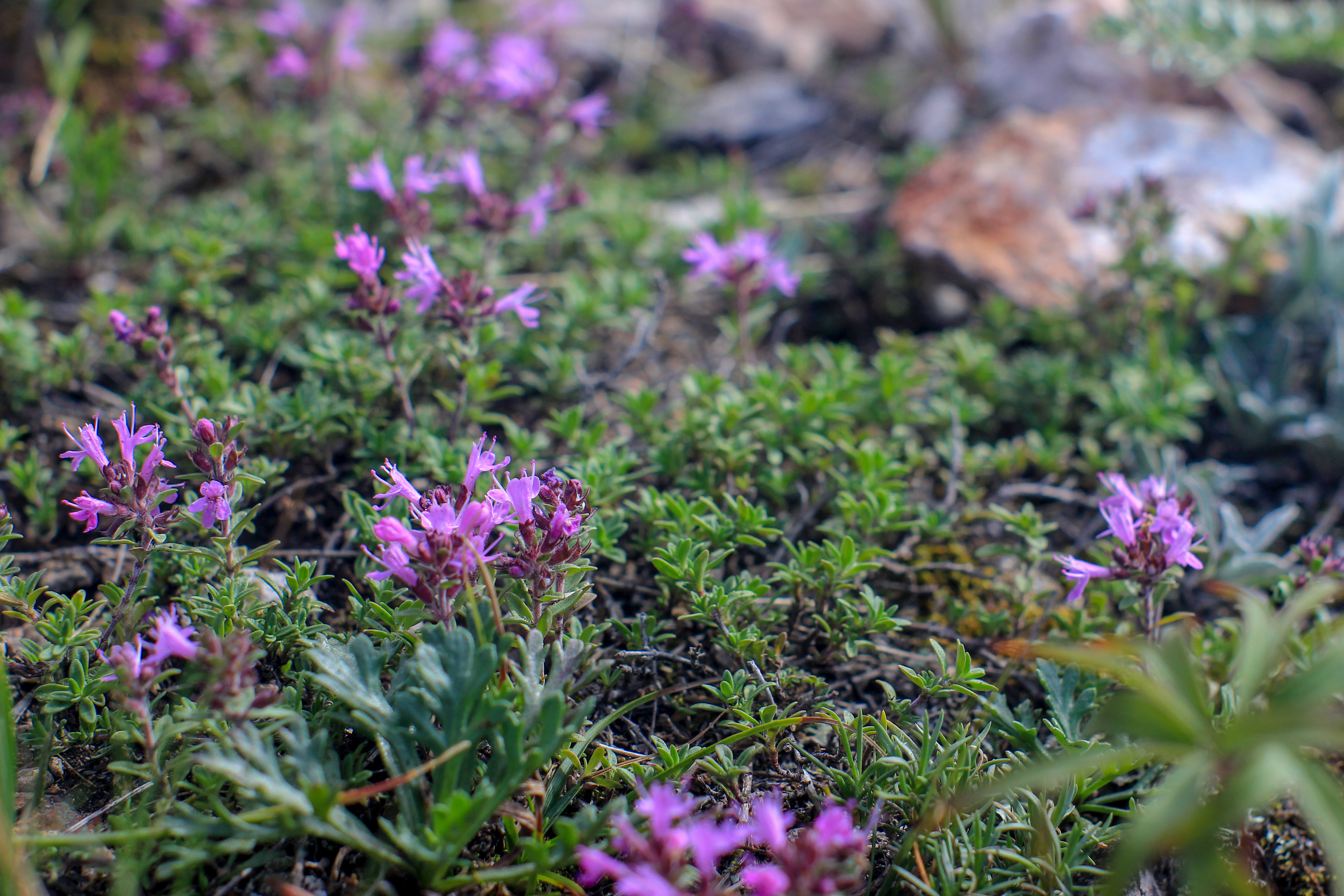

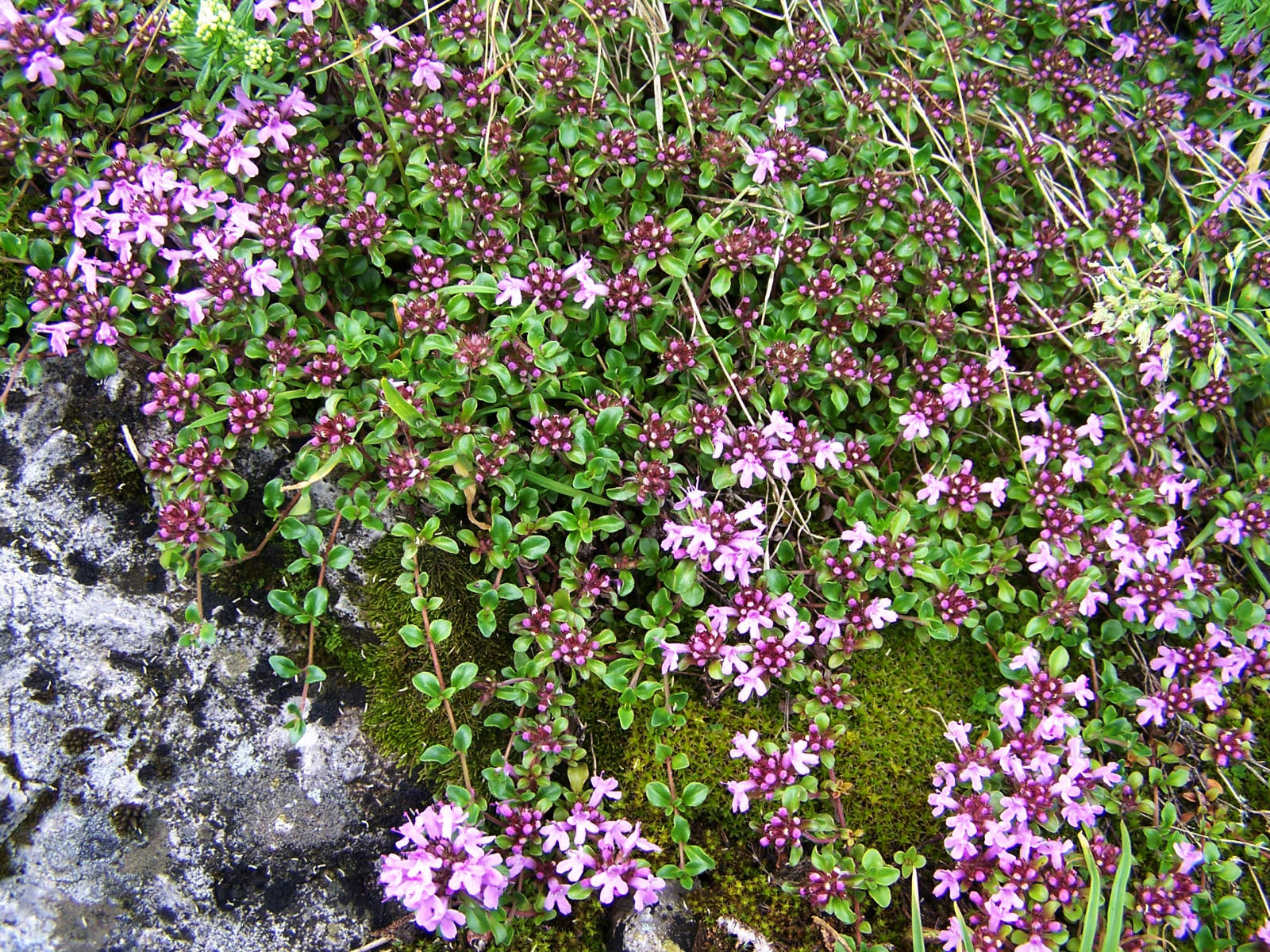

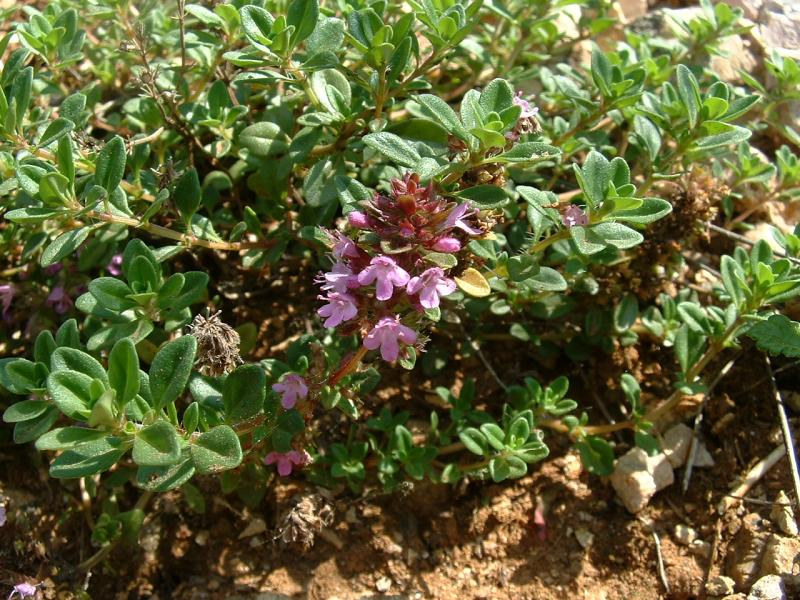

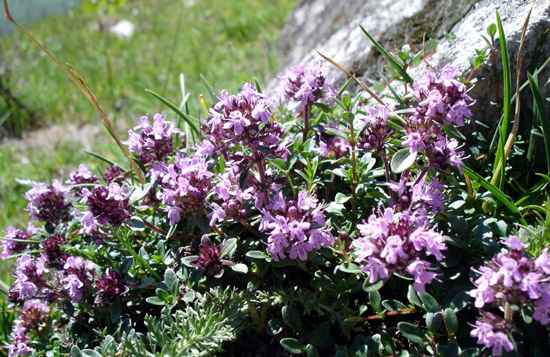

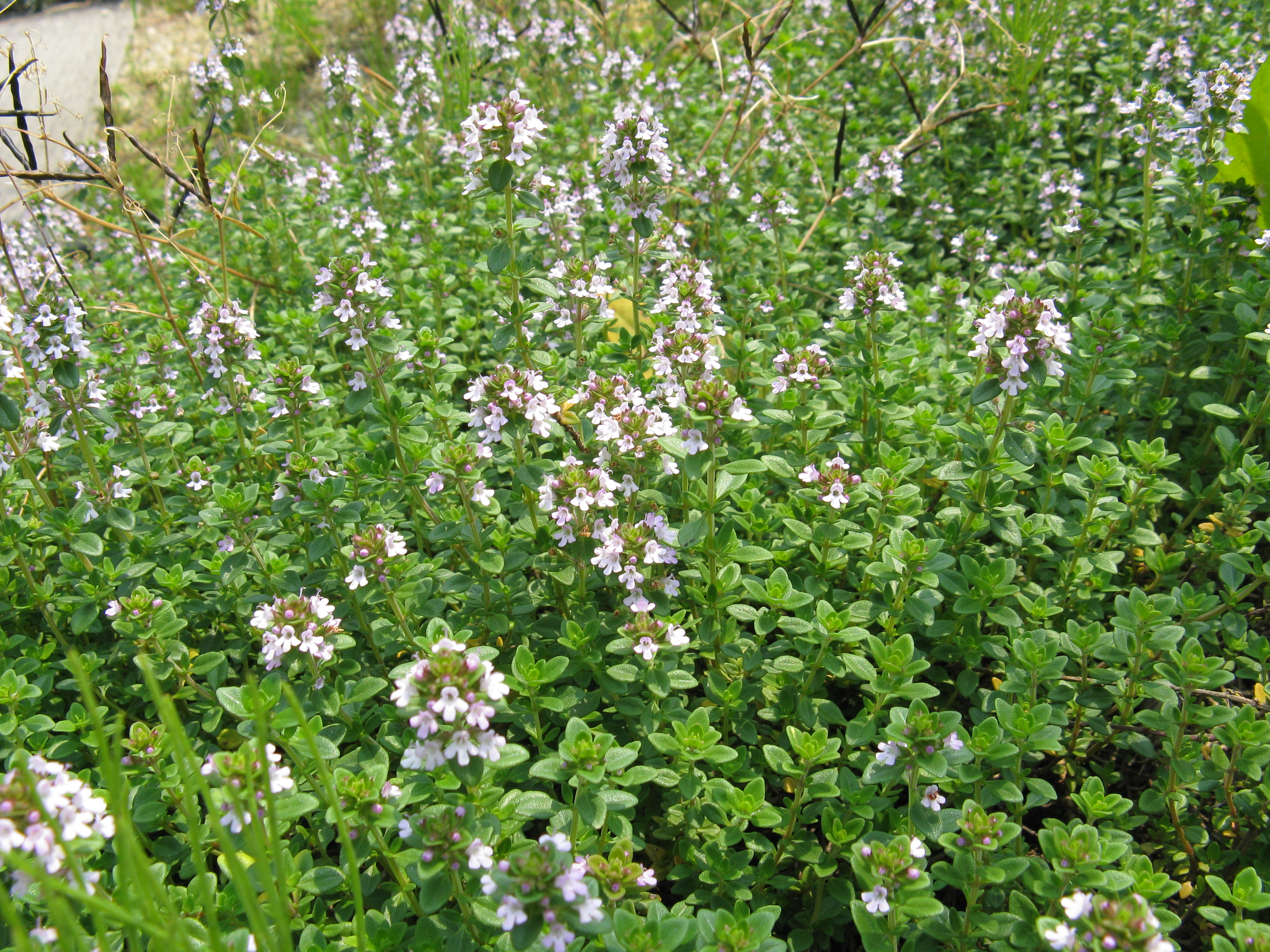
var. albus

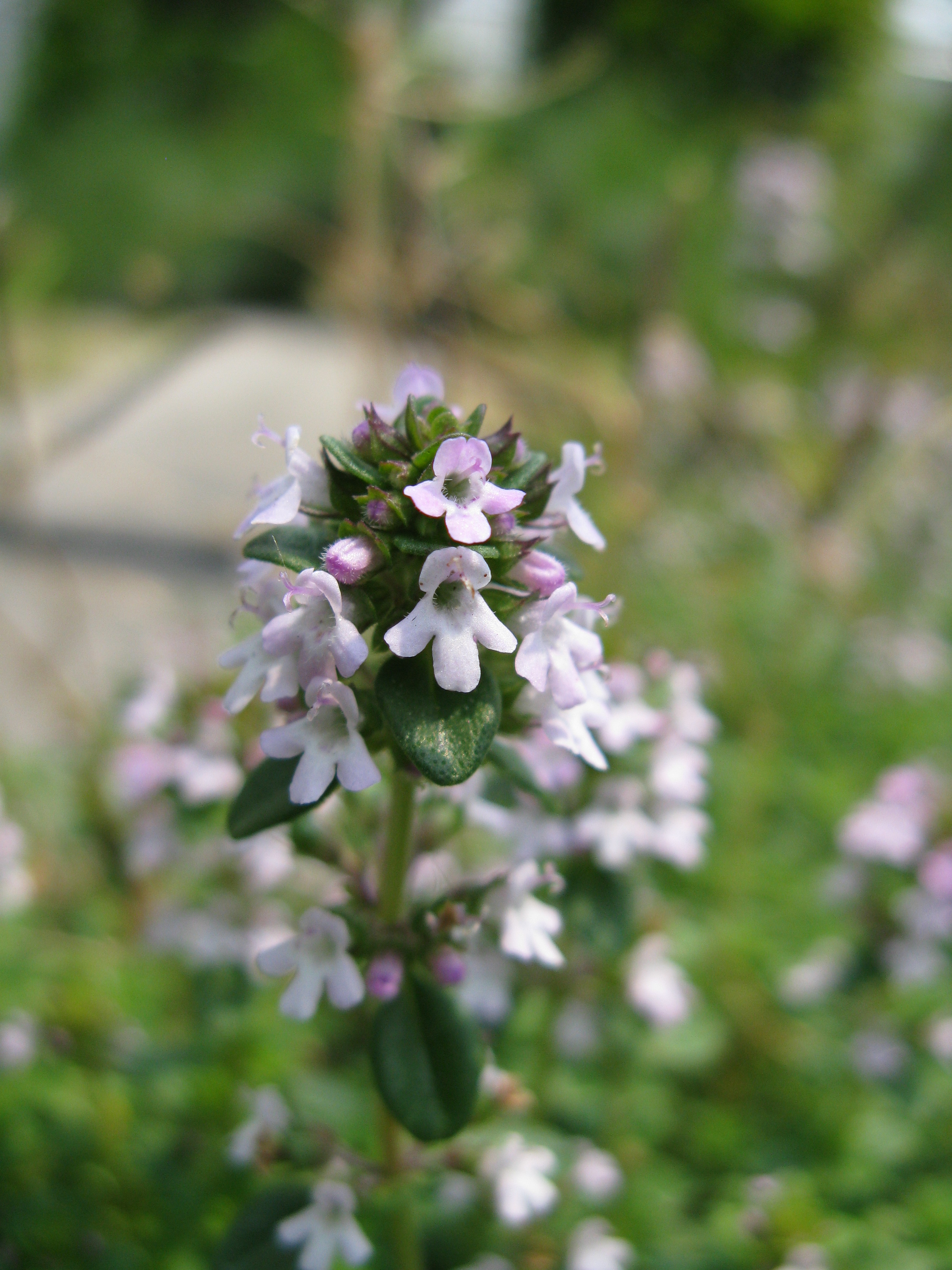
var. albus

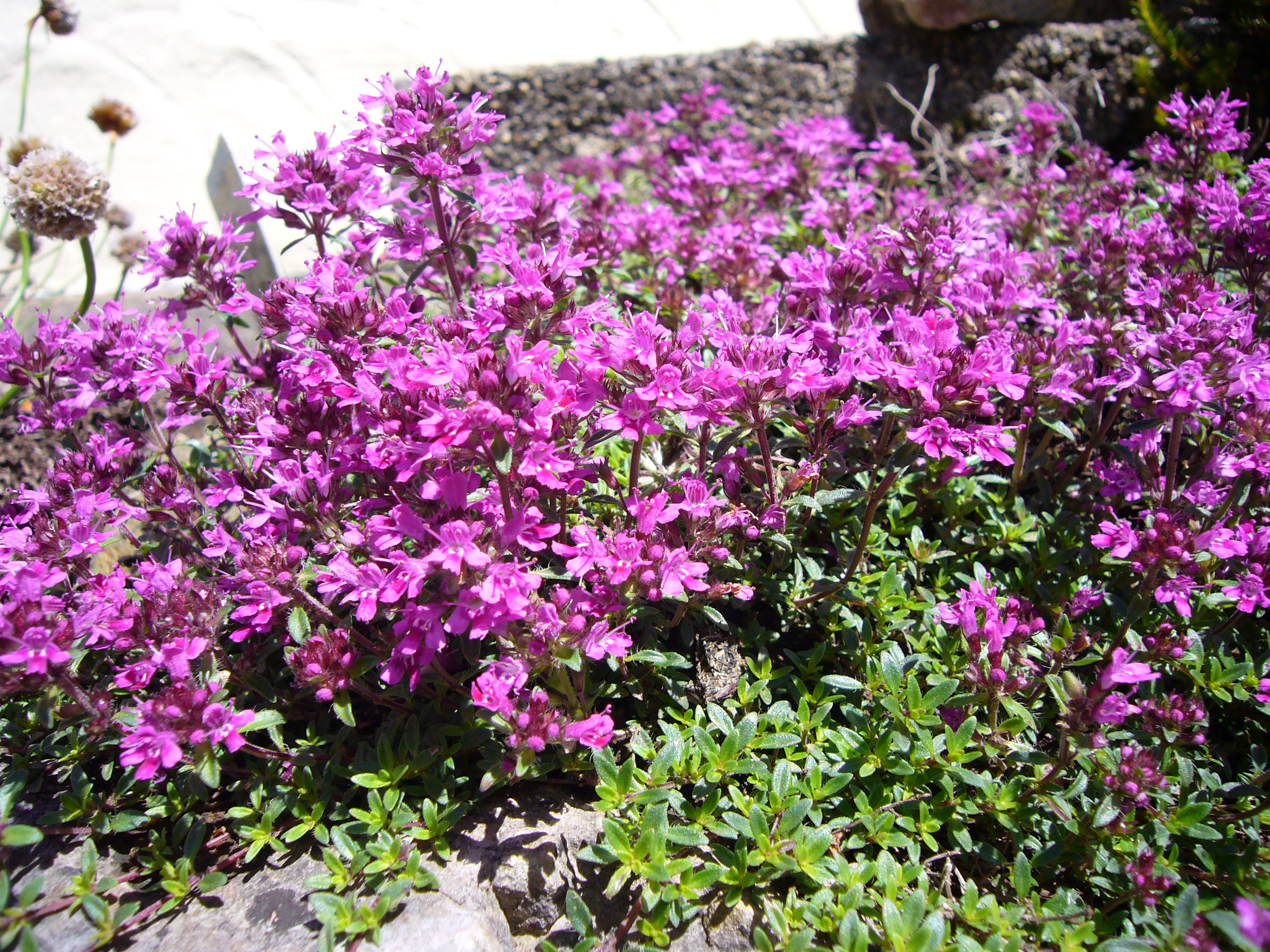
Thymus serpyllum coccineus

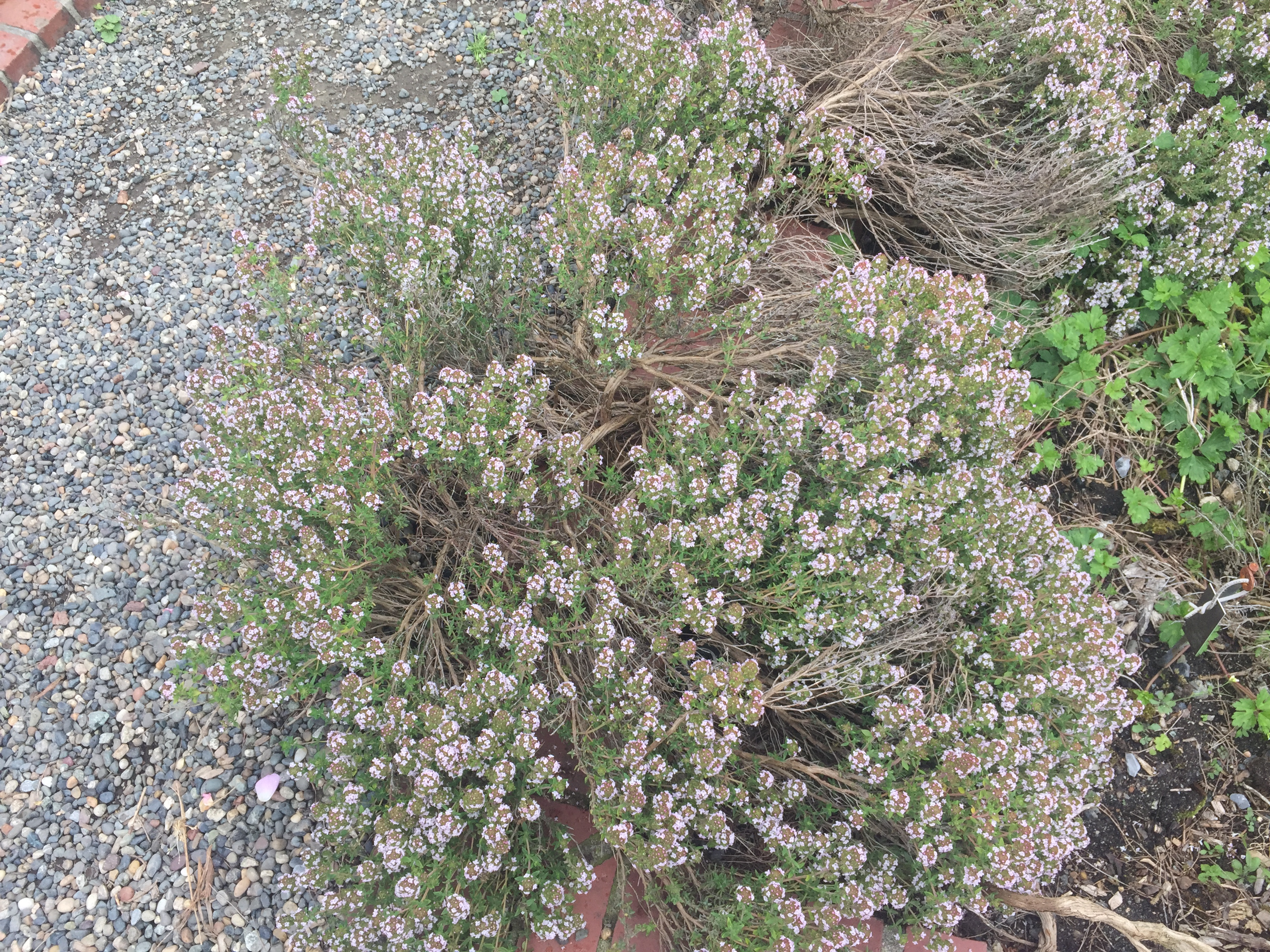
Wild thyme in the UBC Botanical Garden

=== Illustrations ===
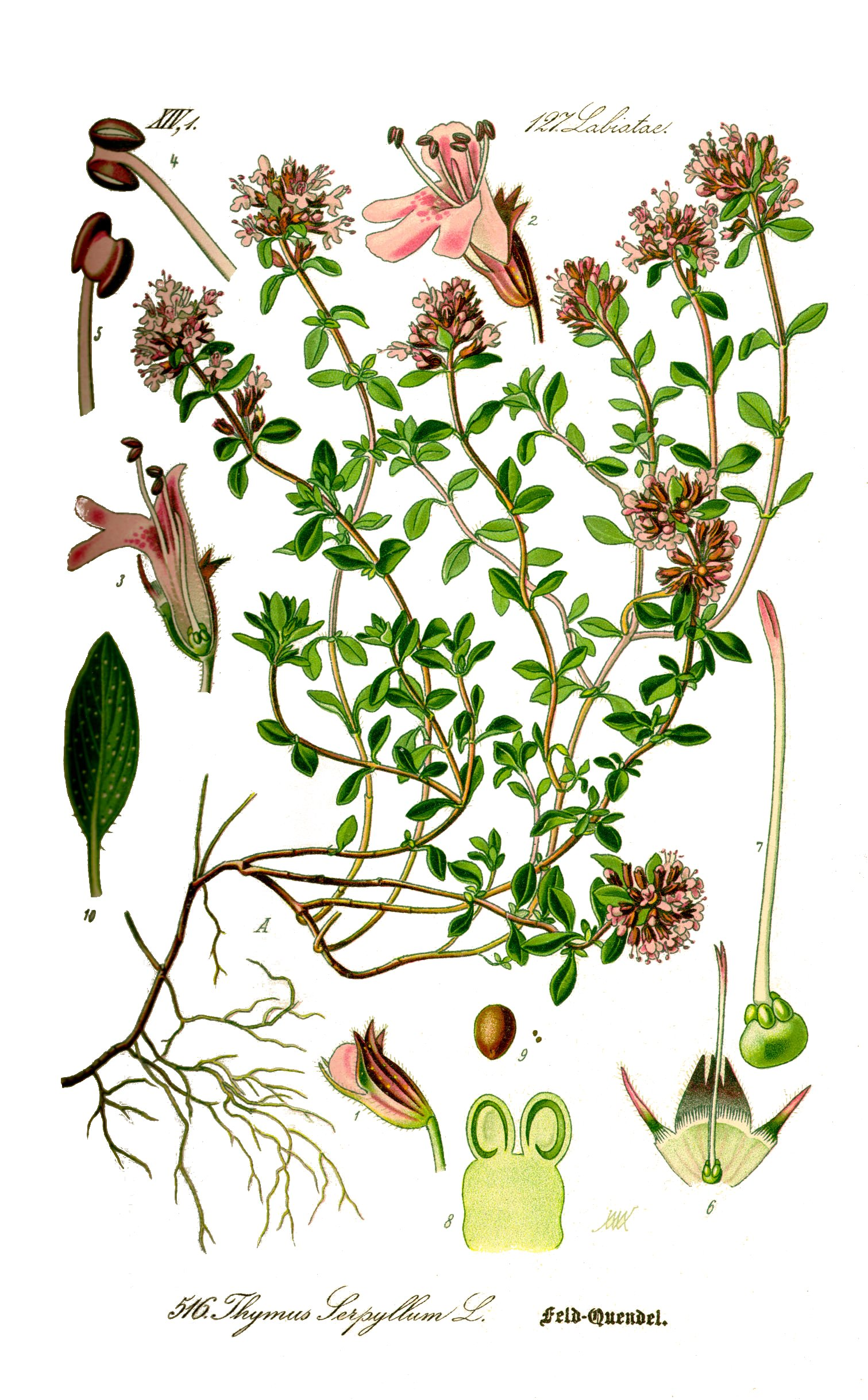

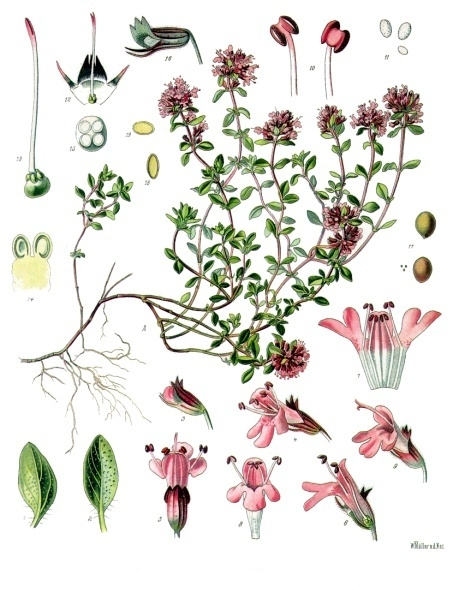

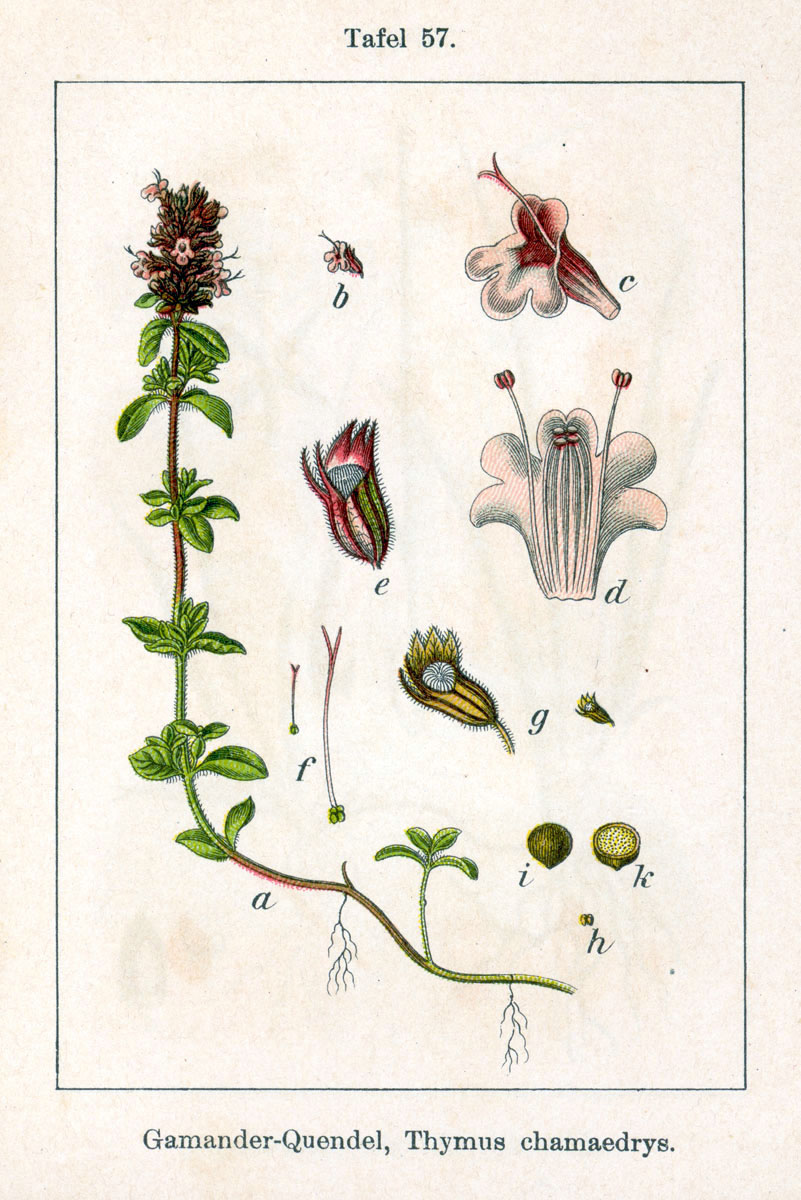

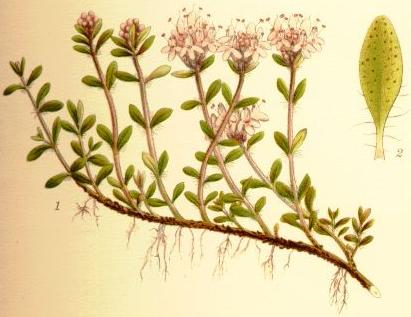

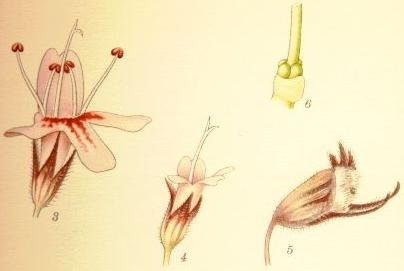
