= Juncus subulatus =

Scientific classification
- Kingdom: Plantae
- Clade: Embryophytes
- Clade: Tracheophytes
- Clade: Spermatophytes
- Clade: Angiosperms
- Clade: Monocots
- Clade: Commelinids
- Order: Poales
- Family: Juncaceae
- Genus: Juncus
- Species: J. subulatus

Binomial name
- Juncus subulatus Forssk.

Synonyms
- Juncus multiflorus Desf.; Juncus siculus Tineo; Tenageia multiflora Fourr.

Species of flowering plant

Juncus subulatus, called the Somerset rush, is a species of flowering plant in the genus Juncus, with a Mediterranean, Middle Eastern and Central Asian distribution, and introduced to Great Britain. It typically grows in salt marshes.
