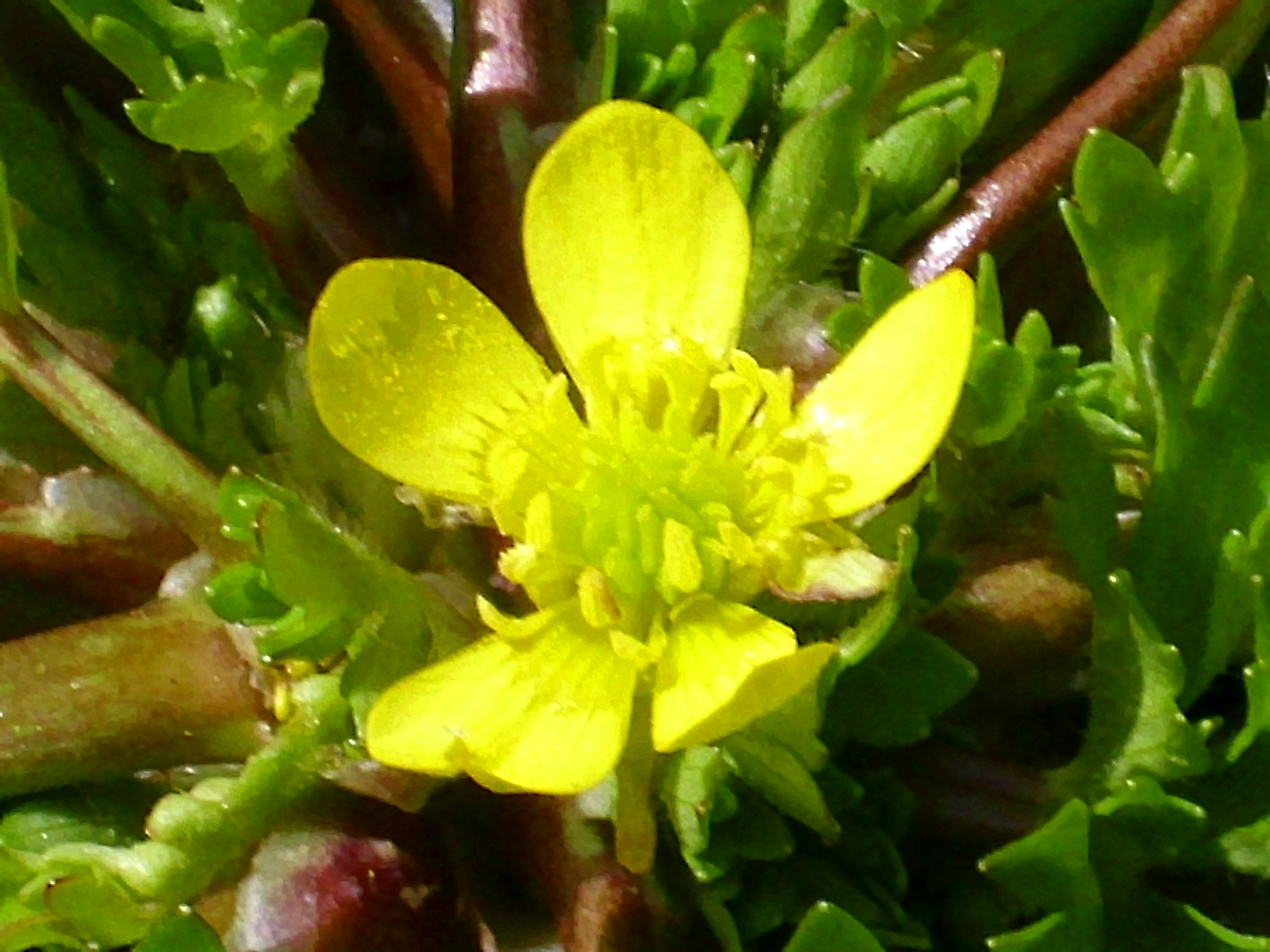

Scientific classification
- Kingdom: Plantae
- Clade: Tracheophytes
- Clade: Angiosperms
- Clade: Eudicots
- Order: Ranunculales
- Family: Ranunculaceae
- Genus: Ranunculus
- Species: R. trilobus

Binomial name
- Ranunculus trilobus Desf.

Synonyms
- Ranunculus vilaenadalis

= Ranunculus trilobus =

Species of plant

Ranunculus trilobus, the threelobe buttercup, is a species of annual herb in the family Ranunculaceae.

== Sources ==
This article incorporates text from a free content work. Licensed under CC0 (license statement/permission). Text taken from Ranunculus trilobus. Encyclopedia of Life.
