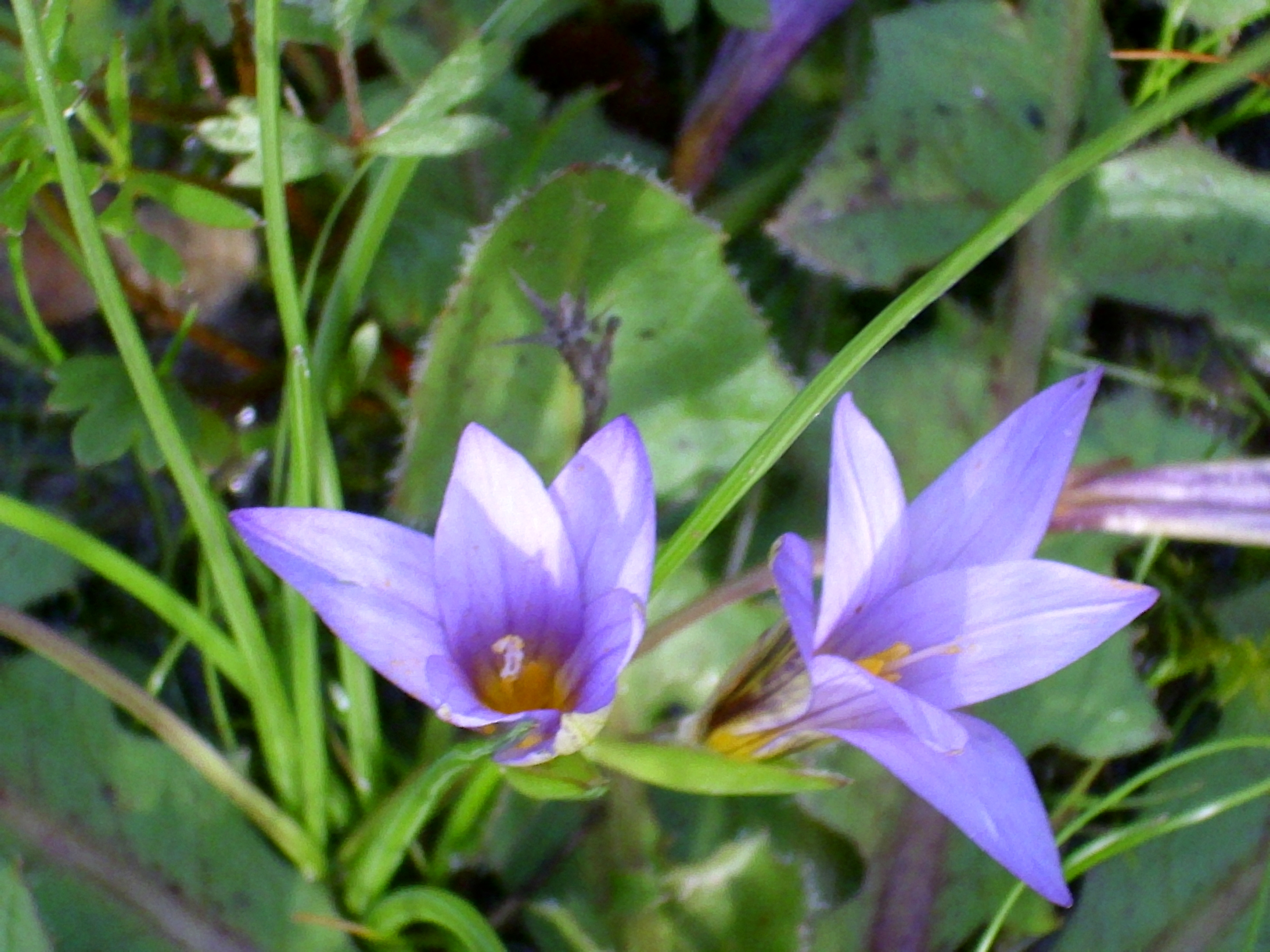

Scientific classification
- Kingdom: Plantae
- Clade: Tracheophytes
- Clade: Angiosperms
- Clade: Monocots
- Order: Asparagales
- Family: Iridaceae
- Genus: Romulea
- Species: R. ramiflora

Binomial name
- Romulea ramiflora Ten.

= Romulea ramiflora =

Species of plant

Romulea ramiflora is a species of plant in the family Iridaceae.

== Sources ==
This article incorporates text from a free content work. Licensed under CC0 (license statement/permission). Text taken from Romulea ramiflora. Encyclopedia of Life.
