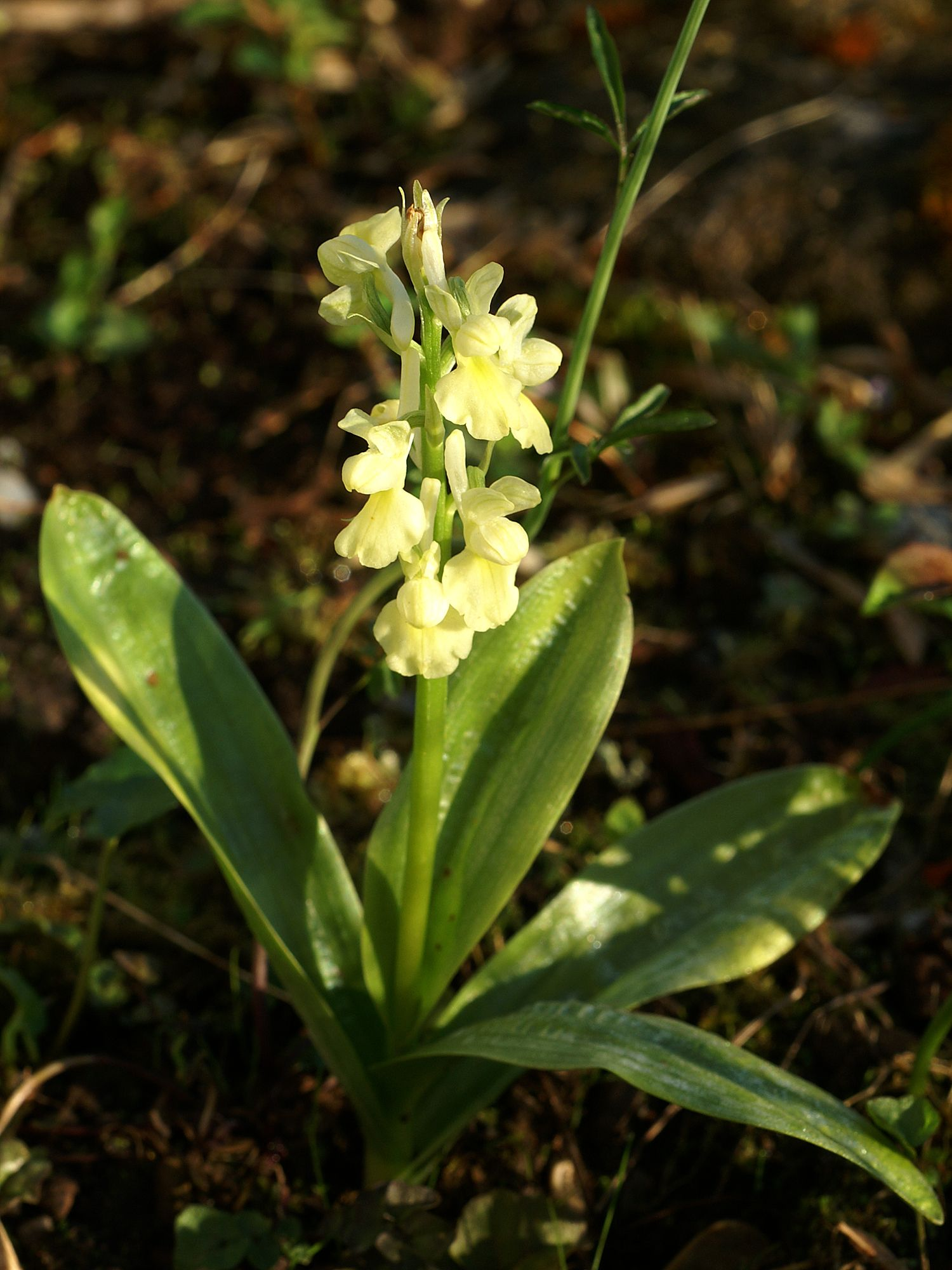

Conservation status
- Least Concern (IUCN 3.1)

Scientific classification
- Kingdom: Plantae
- Clade: Tracheophytes
- Clade: Angiosperms
- Clade: Monocots
- Order: Asparagales
- Family: Orchidaceae
- Subfamily: Orchidoideae
- Genus: Orchis
- Species: O. pallens

Binomial name
- Orchis pallens L.

Synonyms
- Androrchis pallens (L.) D.Tyteca & E.Klein; Orchis pallens f. pseudopallens Rchb.f.; Orchis pseudopallens K.Koch [Illegitimate]; Orchis sulphurea Sims

= Orchis pallens =

Species of plant

Orchis pallens, the pale orchid or pale-flowered orchid, is a perennial herbaceous plant belonging to the genus Orchis of the family Orchidaceae. It is found in most of Europe ranging from Spain across to the Caucasus. It blooms in spring with pale yellow flowers.

== Description ==
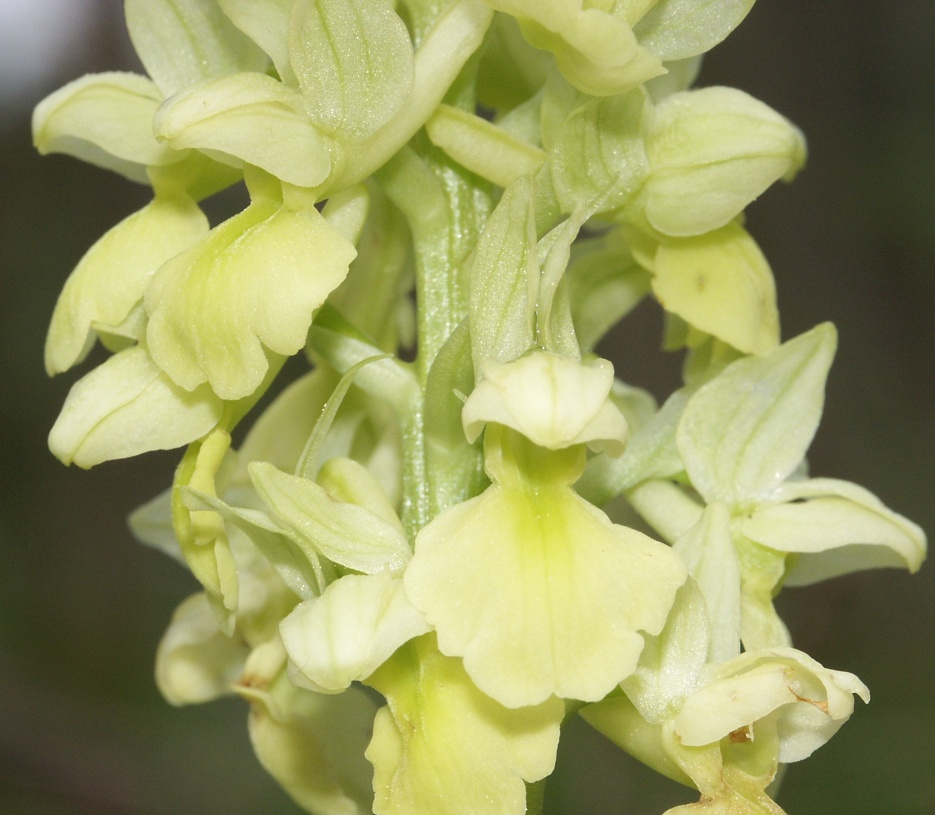
Close-up of the flowers of O. pallens

Orchis pallens is the least variable of the Orchis genus.

It has a tuber, which is round, or oval in shape. They are 3–3.5 cm (1–1 in) long and 1.5–2 cm (1–1 in) in diameter, underneath the tuber are numerous secondary roots which are 10–20 cm (4–8 in) long.

Above the tuber, it has 4-6 leaves, arranged in basal rosette. The leaves are large, 6–15 cm (2–6 in) long and 1.5–5 cm (1–2 in) wide. They are sometimes so long that they cover the flowers. They are unspotted, and oblong or oblong-ovate, or lanceolate shaped, green, shiny, bright, and smooth.

In Central Europe, O. pallens is sometimes confused with yellow-flowering form of orchid, Dactylorhiza sambucina. They can easily be distinguished from each other by several morphological features, including D. sambucina has leaves which are distributed along the stem.

Orchis pallens has a strong, straight, green stem, which is 15–45 cm (5.9–17.7 in) tall.

Orchis pallens is one of the first orchids in the northern part of its distribution area to bloom. As it blooms in the spring, or mid spring to late spring, between from late April to late May, and sometimes in June. The blooms give a fragrance that is similar to elder tree flowers. One source regarded that the flower smells like the urine of cats, and the foul fragrance is mostly nocturnal and foul, notes another source. Although another source claims it is pleasantly and delicately fragrant.

It has pale yellow, or yellow flowers.

In terms of identification, it can be readily distinguished from the similarly coloured Orchis pauciflora and Orchis provincialis, and also Orchis laeta, by virtue of the total lack of lip markings on the flowers of O. pallens. The other mentioned orchid species have red-dots on the flower lips. The unspotted, somewhat darker lip contains no nectar. The labellum or lip is slightly trilobal, wider, slightly convex and longer than the other petals. It is 6-16 mm long and 7-16 mm wide, slightly arched in the centre, has edges which are rolled up and is yellow-greenish.

Orchis pallens can also be easily differentiated from Dactylorhiza sambucina, by the presence of bracts which protrude through the inflorescence. The bracts of O. pallens are yellow.

The flower of O. pallens is 4–10 cm (2–4 in) long. The upper outer petals are almost elliptical, blunt, 8-100 mm long and 6-80 mm wide. The lateral outer petals are of a similar size, but asymmetric, blunt and strongly bent back. The oval to lanceolate shaped, lateral inner petals are 6-80 mm long and 40 mm wide.

The ovary is 10-15 mm long, narrow, arched, twisted and green.

After it has flowered, it produces a seed capsule which is 15–20 mm (1–1 in) long and a bit bloated.

== Biochemistry ==
Diploid results from the basic chromosome number of the genus Orchis of x = 20.

In 1986, the European orchids Orchis mascula, O. pallens and their hybrids were analysed by enzyme electrophoresis on starch gels, this a form of species identification using differing parental alleles.

Similar to Dactylorhiza sambucina and Orchis spitzelii, O. pallens has a chromosome count of 2n = 42/40.

== Taxonomy ==
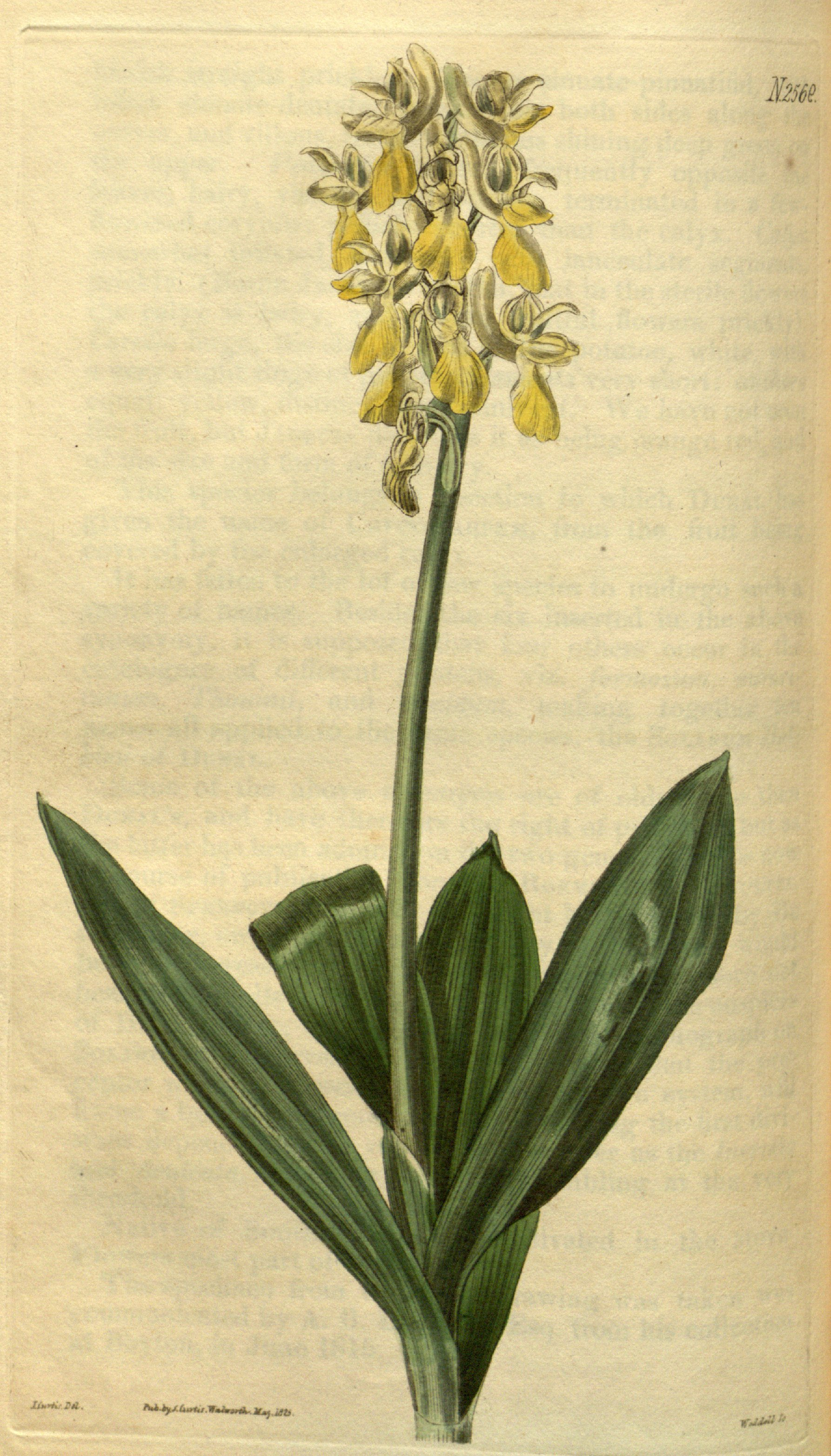
Orchis pallens (described as Orchis sulphurea) in Curtis 52 on plate 2569 (Illustrated in 1825)

It is commonly known as the pale orchid, or the pale flowered orchid.

The scientific name Orchis derives from Ancient Greek ὄρχις orchis, meaning "testicle", from the appearance of the paired subterranean 'tuberoids', while the Latin name pallens refers to the pale colour of the inflorescence.

It was first described and published by Carl Linnaeus in his book Mantissa Plantarum Altera Vol.2 on page 292 in 1771.

It is an accepted RHS name and was last listed in the RHS Plant Finder in 2011.

=== Hybrids ===
It has naturally hybridized with other orchids;

- Orchis × klopfensteiniae P.Delforge (O. pallens × Orchis spitzelii) (from SW Europe),
- Orchis x loreziana Brügger (O. mascula × O. pallens) (from Europe), which was published in Beitr. Kennt. Ung. Chur. on page 58 in 1874.
  - Orchis × loreziana nothosubsp. kisslingii (Beck) Potucek (O. mascula subsp. speciosa × O. pallens) (from Eastern Europe), found in 1976, (Kew accepted),
  - Orchis × loreziana nothosubsp. loreziana (O. mascula subsp. mascula × O. pallens) (from Central Europe),
- Orchis × permixta Soó (O. mascula subsp. signifera × O. pallens × O. provincialis) (from Crimea),
- Orchis × plessidiaca Renz (O. pallens × O. provincialis) (from SE Europe to Crimea),

== Distribution and habitat ==
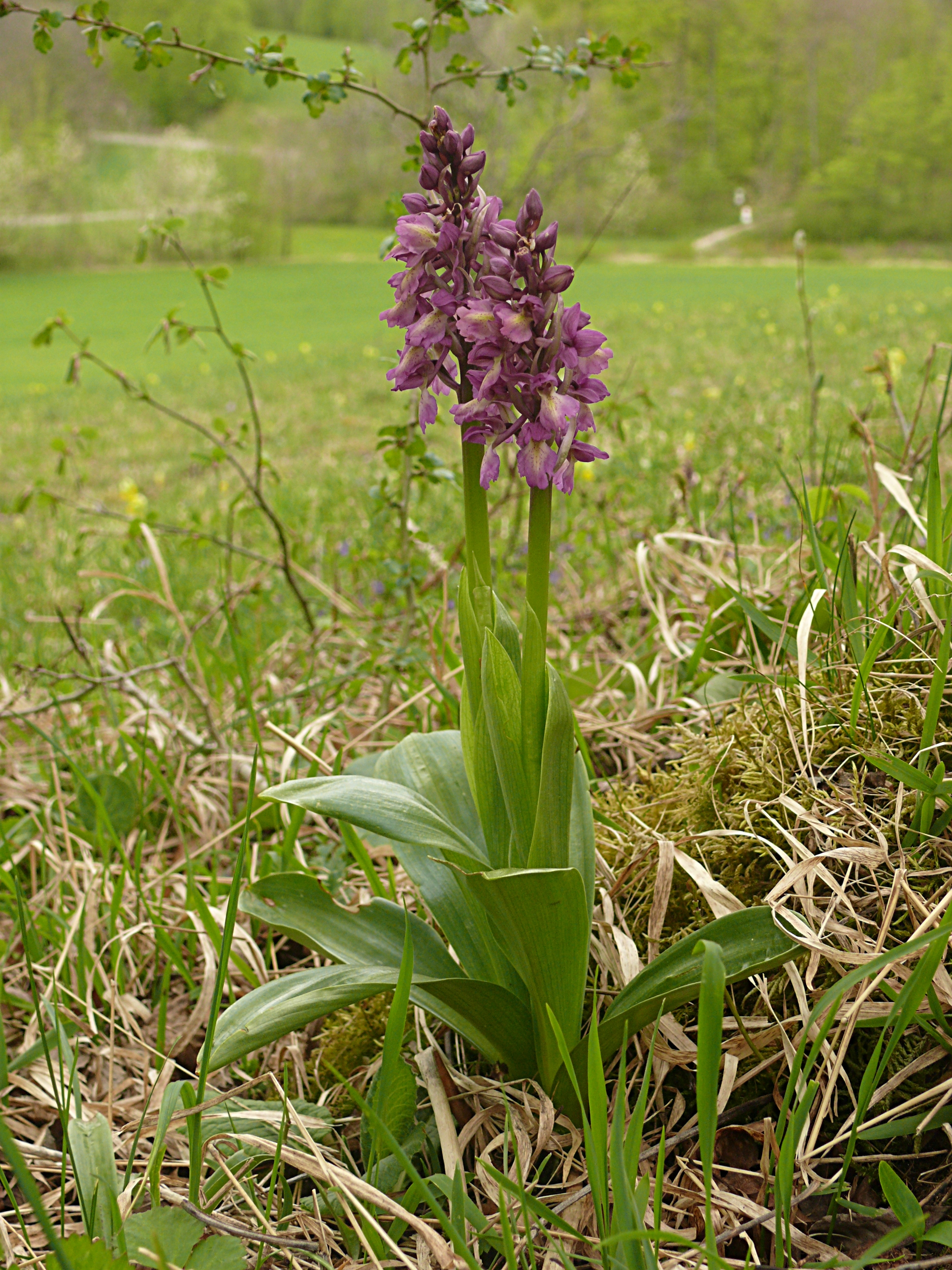
Orchis × loreziana hybrid orchid (parents Orchis mascula × Orchis pallens)

The distribution of O. pallens is widespread in Europe, stretching from northern Spain, heading east across central Europe and the Balkans, to the Middle East and the Caucasus region (or Asia Minor,) in the east. It is found in Albania, Austria, Bulgaria, Croatia, Czechia, France (France (mainland) and Corsica), Germany, Greece, Hungary, Italy, Poland, Romania, Slovakia, Slovenia, Spain, Switzerland and Ukraine. It is missing in the British Isles and Scandinavia. The northern limit of its distribution in Germany and Poland, mainly southern Poland.

=== Range ===
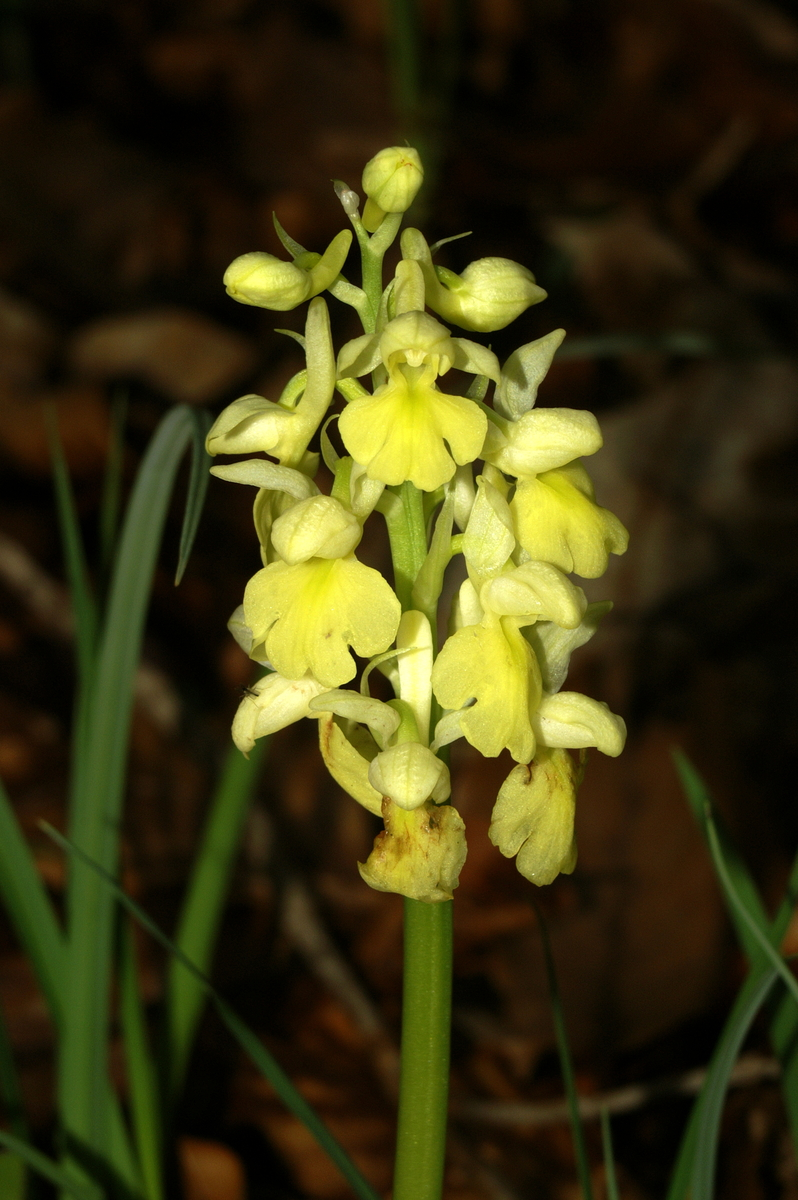
Orchis pallens

In Romania, it is found in the Baiului Mountains.

2 new localities of Orchis pallens in the Chełm mesoregion (Silesian Upland, southern Poland), were found in 2014 in the vicinity of Ligota Dolna and Oleszka villages in Opole Province.

In Bohemia, it is very rare and it grows only in two places (Strakonice and Podkrkonosi). In Moravia, it grows in more places such as (White Carpathians, Vsetin Hills, Beskydy, Chriby and others).

=== Habitat ===
Orchis pallens is found from the lowlands to the mountains, including most of the significant mountain ranges in Europe. It can be found within a very wide altitudinal range, of between 1,000 to 2,500 m (3,300 to 8,200 ft) above sea level.

It grows in damp meadows, open meadows, on shrubland, in clearings, in wetlands (inland), rocky areas (eg. inland cliffs and mountain peaks), and in forests, (either sparse forests or on the edges of forests,) either deciduous or coniferous. Including pine forests, beech forests, mixed hornbeam-linden or oak-hornbeam forests. It avoids deep shaded woodland.

It is found on calcareous soils, (lime rich soils), and on unfertilized slightly moist and rather alkaline meadows.

== Conservation ==
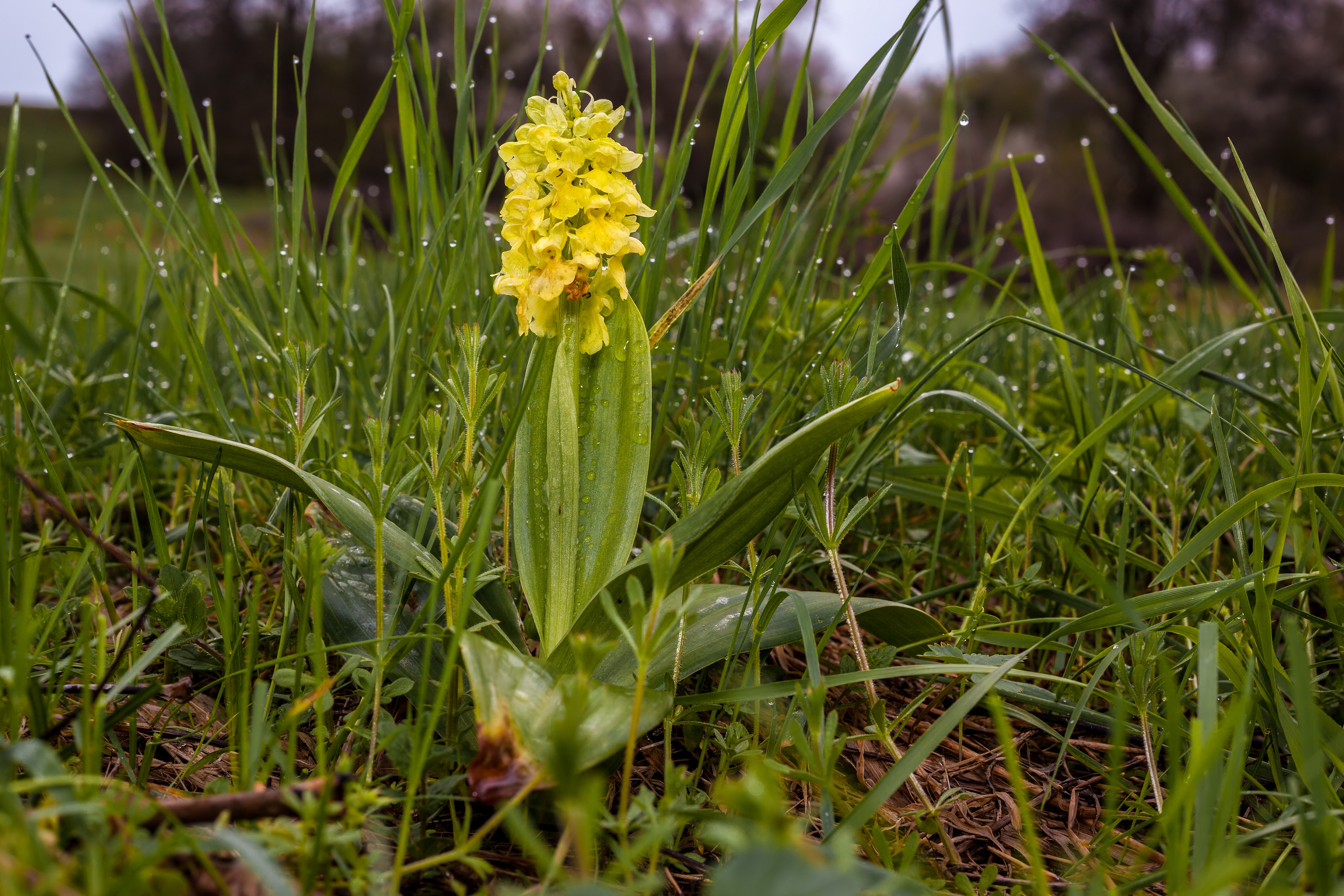
Orchis pallens

It is considered nowhere in its wide distribution area, common and in most areas it is deemed extremely rare, it is uncommon and occurs sporadically almost everywhere in Central Europe.

The main threats to the newly found localities of Orchis pallens are succession processes in xerothermic The populations of the orchid and their habitats are declining, especially in central Europe due to various anthropogenic threats including: the stopping of the coppicing of woods, this causes a decrease in the amount of light reaching the forest floor. Overgrowth of suitable habitats presents one of the greatest threats to the existing populations. Other human threats include farming (on the grassland communities, ) urbanisation and infrastructure expansion, tourism and deforestation and plant collection.

Further habitat threats are posed by lack of rain, late frost, damage by wild animals such as badgers and wild boars, (Bournérias and Prat 2005, Delforge 1995, Giros 2009, Kretzschmar et al. 2007, Pignatti 1982, Rossi 2002). This has meant many population sites have been declining rapidly especially in central Europe.

Owing to the decline of its natural populations, O. pallens has been protected by law in many European countries (Averyanov 2008: 401-402; Elias et al. 2015; Grulich 2012; Kiraly 2007; Ludwig & Schnittler, 1996; Moser et al. 2002; Protopova 2009: 205; Z & Fiobor 2014: 783-786).

It is on the 'Carpathian Red List of Endangered Species' (covering Slovakia and Romania), and it is in "Red book of vascular plants from Romania" (Dihoru & Negrean 2009).

In southern Poland, active nature protection is employing measures such as mowing or shrub removal.

It is a highly endangered species in Czech, it is protected by law, and it is also covered by the protection of the internal CITES convention.

== Ecology ==
Even though the plant does not produce nectar, the flowers are pollinated by bees, who mistakenly land on the plant when looking for the spring pea (Lathyrus vernus) which does produce nectar.

== Culture ==
It was named Orchid of the Year in 2012 by the 'Arbeitskreis Heimische Orchideen' (AHO, Native Orchid Research Group), a German orchid conservation federation.

== Other sources ==
- Working groups local orchids (ed.): The orchids of Germany. Working groups of domestic orchids, Uhlstädt-Kirchhasel 2005, ISBN 3-00-014853-1
- Helmut Baumann, Siegfried Künkele: The wild growing orchids of Europe. Franckh, Stuttgart 1982, ISBN 3-440-05068-8
- Karl-Peter Buttler : Orchids. The wild growing species and subspecies of Europe, the Middle East and North Africa (= Steinbach's natural guide. 15). Mosaik, Munich 1986, ISBN 3-570-04403-3
- Robert L. Dressler: The orchids - biology and systematics of the Orchidaceae (original title: The Orchids. Natural History and Classification. Harvard University Press, Cambridge, Mass. Et al. 1981). Translated by Guido J. Braem with the assistance of Marion Zerbst. Bechtermünz, Augsburg 1996, ISBN 3-86047-413-8
- Hans Sundermann : European and Mediterranean orchids. 2nd Edition. Brücke, Hildesheim 1975, ISBN 3-87105-010-5
- John G. Williams, Andrew E. Williams, Norman Arlott: Orchids of Europe with North Africa and Asia Minor (= BLV determination book. 25). Translated, edited and supplemented by Karl-Peter Buttler and Angelika Rommel. BLV, Munich / Bern / Vienna 1979, ISBN 3-405-11901-4
