= Orchid of the Year =

The Orchid of the Year (Orchidee des Jahres) is a yearly honor given since 1989 to an orchid species native to Germany by the Arbeitskreis Heimische Orchideen (AHO, Native Orchid Research Group), a German orchid conservation federation. The choice of orchids follows the endangerment of the species or its habitat due to human pressure.

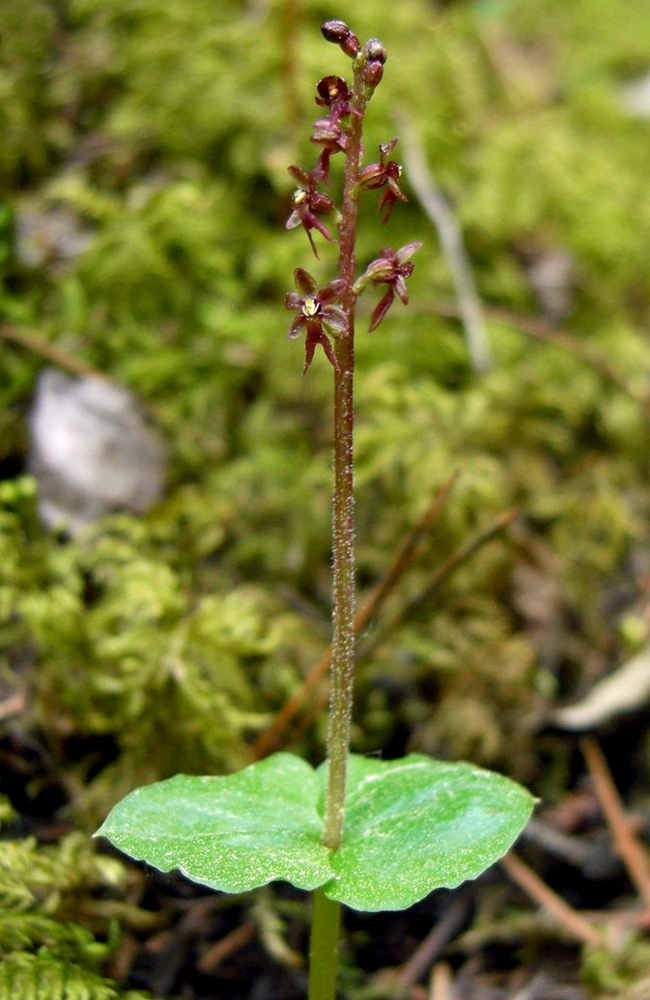
Heartleaf twayblade Neottia cordata Orchid of the Year 2023

== Orchids of the year ==
1989	Broad-leaved marsh orchid	Dactylorhiza majalis
1990	Pyramidal orchid	Anacamptis pyramidalis
1991	Green-winged orchid	Orchis morio
1992	European common twayblade	Neottia ovata (then Listera ovata)
1993	Military orchid	Orchis militaris
1994	Fen orchid	Liparis loeselii
1995	Bee orchid	Ophrys apifera
1996		Cypripedium calceolus
1997	Bug orchid	Orchis coriophora
1998	Marsh helleborine	Epipactis palustris
1999	Lizard orchid	Himantoglossum hircinum
2000	Red helleborine	Cephalanthera rubra
2001	Autumn ladies'-tresses	Spiranthes spiralis
2002	Bird's-nest orchid	Neottia nidus-avis
2003	Fly orchid	Ophrys insectifera
2004	Frog orchid	Coeloglossum viride
2005	Burnt orchid	Orchis ustulata
2006	Broadleaf helleborine	Epipactis helleborine
2007		Nigritella nigra subsp. rhellicani
2008	Southern marsh-orchid	Dactylorhiza praetermissa
2009	Early purple orchid	Orchis mascula
2010		Cypripedium calceolus
2011	Lesser butterfly orchid	Platanthera bifolia
2012	Pale-flowered orchid	Orchis pallens
2013	Lady orchid	Orchis purpurea
2014	Ghost orchid	Epipogium aphyllum
2015	Early marsh orchid	Dactylorhiza incarnata
2016	Summer lady's-tresses	Spiranthes aestivalis
2017	White Helleborine	Cephalanthera damasonium
2018		Dactylorhiza majalis subsp. sphagnicola
2019	Three-toothed orchid	Neotinea tridentata
2020	Broad-leaved marsh orchid	Dactylorhiza majalis
2021	Creeping lady's-tresses	Goodyera repens
2022	Dark red helleborine	Epipactis atrorubens
2023	Heartleaf twayblade	Neottia cordata
