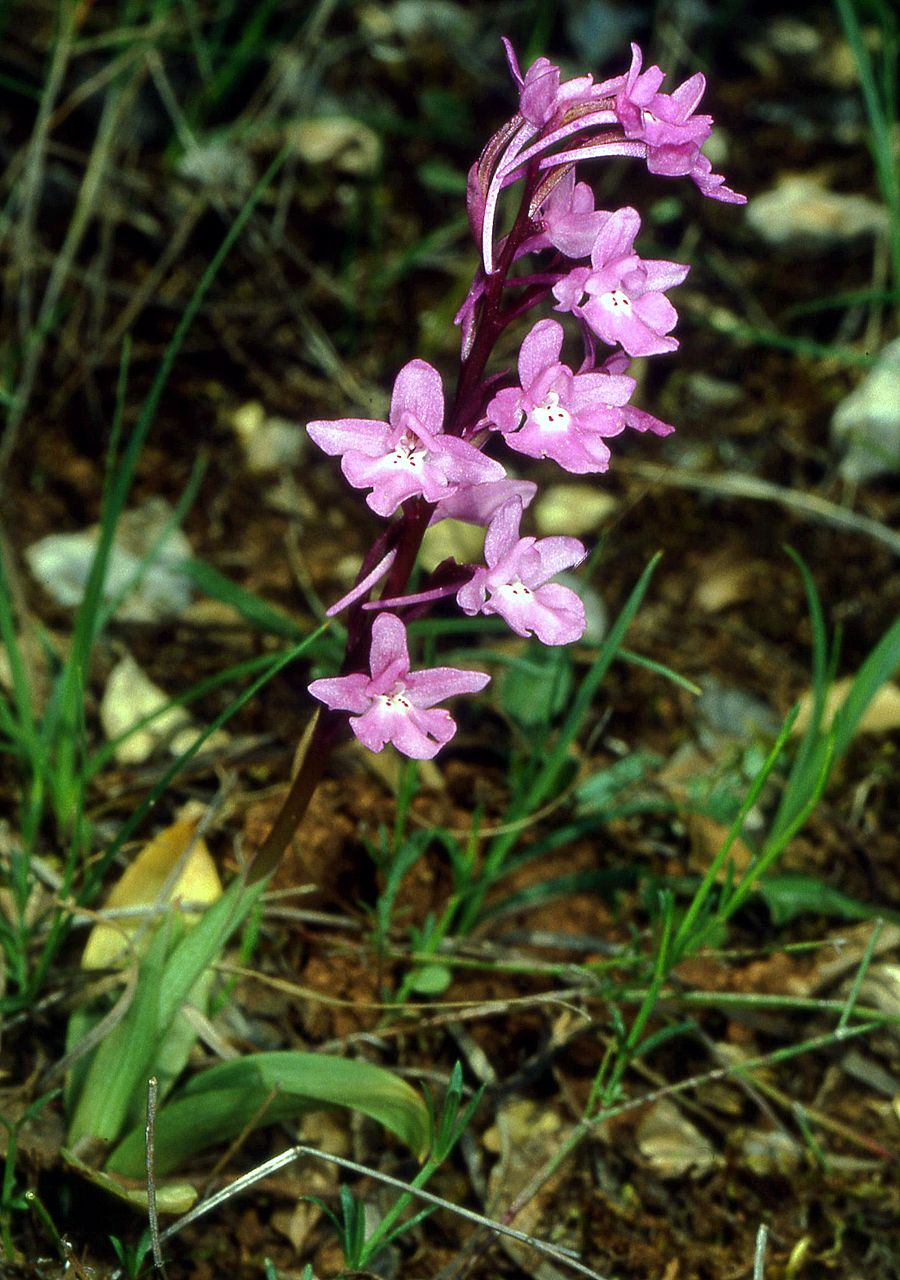
- Orchis quadripunctata

Scientific classification
- Kingdom: Plantae
- Clade: Tracheophytes
- Clade: Angiosperms
- Clade: Monocots
- Order: Asparagales
- Family: Orchidaceae
- Subfamily: Orchidoideae
- Genus: Orchis
- Species: O. quadripunctata

Binomial name
- Orchis quadripunctata Cirillo ex Ten.

Synonyms
- Orchis hostii Tratt.; Orchis bipunctata Raf.; Orchis trichocera Brongn.; Gymnadenia humilis Lindl.; Orchis nicodemi Sieber ex Steud.; Orchis cupanii Tod.; Anacamptis trichocera K.Koch; Orchis quadripunctata var. albiflora Raulin; Orchis quadripunctata f. albiflora (Raulin) De Langhe & D'hose

= Orchis quadripunctata =

Four-spotted orchis

Species of orchid

Orchis quadripunctata, the four-spotted orchis, is a species of orchid found from southern Italy to the eastern Mediterranean.
