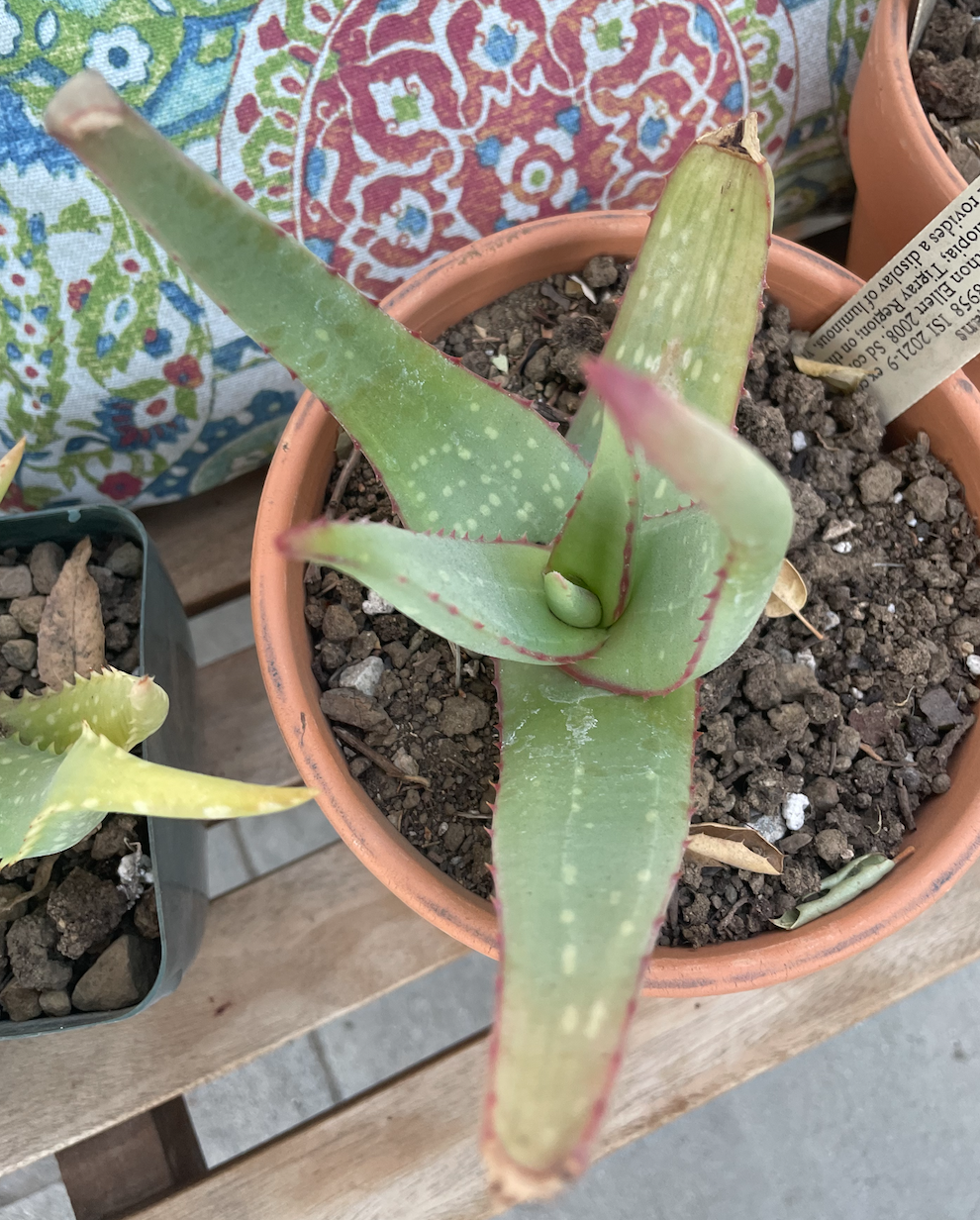

Conservation status
- Least Concern (IUCN 3.1)
- CITES Appendix II (CITES)

Scientific classification
- Kingdom: Plantae
- Clade: Tracheophytes
- Clade: Angiosperms
- Clade: Monocots
- Order: Asparagales
- Family: Asphodelaceae
- Subfamily: Asphodeloideae
- Genus: Aloe
- Species: A. elegans

Binomial name
- Aloe elegans Tod.

Synonyms
- Aloe abyssinica var. peacockii Baker; Aloe aethiopica (Schweinf.) A.Berger; Aloe peacockii (Baker) A.Berger; Aloe vera var. aethiopica Schweinf.

= Aloe elegans =

Species of succulent

Aloe elegans is a species of plant. It is found in West Sudan, Eritrea and Central Ethiopia

== Description ==
When mature, an Aloe elegans will be 3-4 ft tall. These plants are very undistinguished and similar. Most central African aloes are like this. It features green leaves with red margins and sometimes red or maroon tips. Young leaves may have white spots that tend to go away as they age.

== Flowers ==
Flowers are on tall racemes that branch and end in small clumps of yellow-orange or scarlet flowers which are tubular like most aloe flowers.
