= Orchis sitiaca =

Scientific classification
- Kingdom: Plantae
- Clade: Tracheophytes
- Clade: Angiosperms
- Clade: Monocots
- Order: Asparagales
- Family: Orchidaceae
- Subfamily: Orchidoideae
- Genus: Orchis
- Species: O. sitiaca

Binomial name
- Orchis sitiaca (Renz) P.Delforge (1990)

Synonyms
- Androrchis sitiaca (Renz) D.Tyteca & E.Klein (2008); Orchis anatolica subsp. sitiaca Renz (1932)

Species of orchid

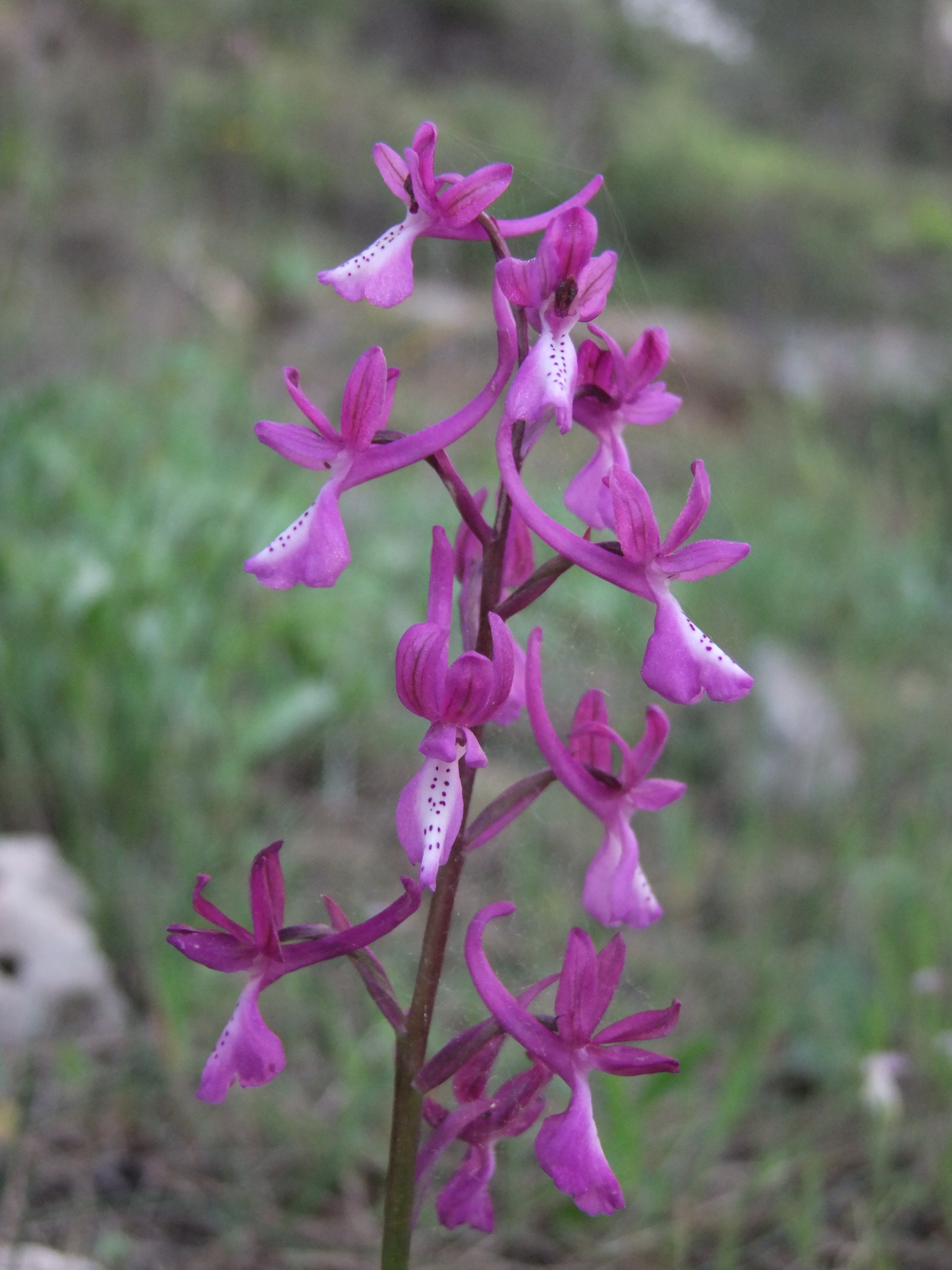
Orchis anatolica

Orchis sitiaca is a species of orchid. It is a tuberous geophyte endemic to Crete, where it is native to the islands' central and eastern mountains.

The species is similar to Orchis anatolica, but is typically stronger and taller, growing 10 to 50 cm tall. It typically flowers between April 1 and early May.

It grows in meadow-like areas in low shrubland (phrygana), where it can form large colonies, and more seldom in pinewoods, up to 1,400 meters elevation. It grows in full sun or part shade, and prefers weakly acid subsoil, including areas of weathered serpentinite.
