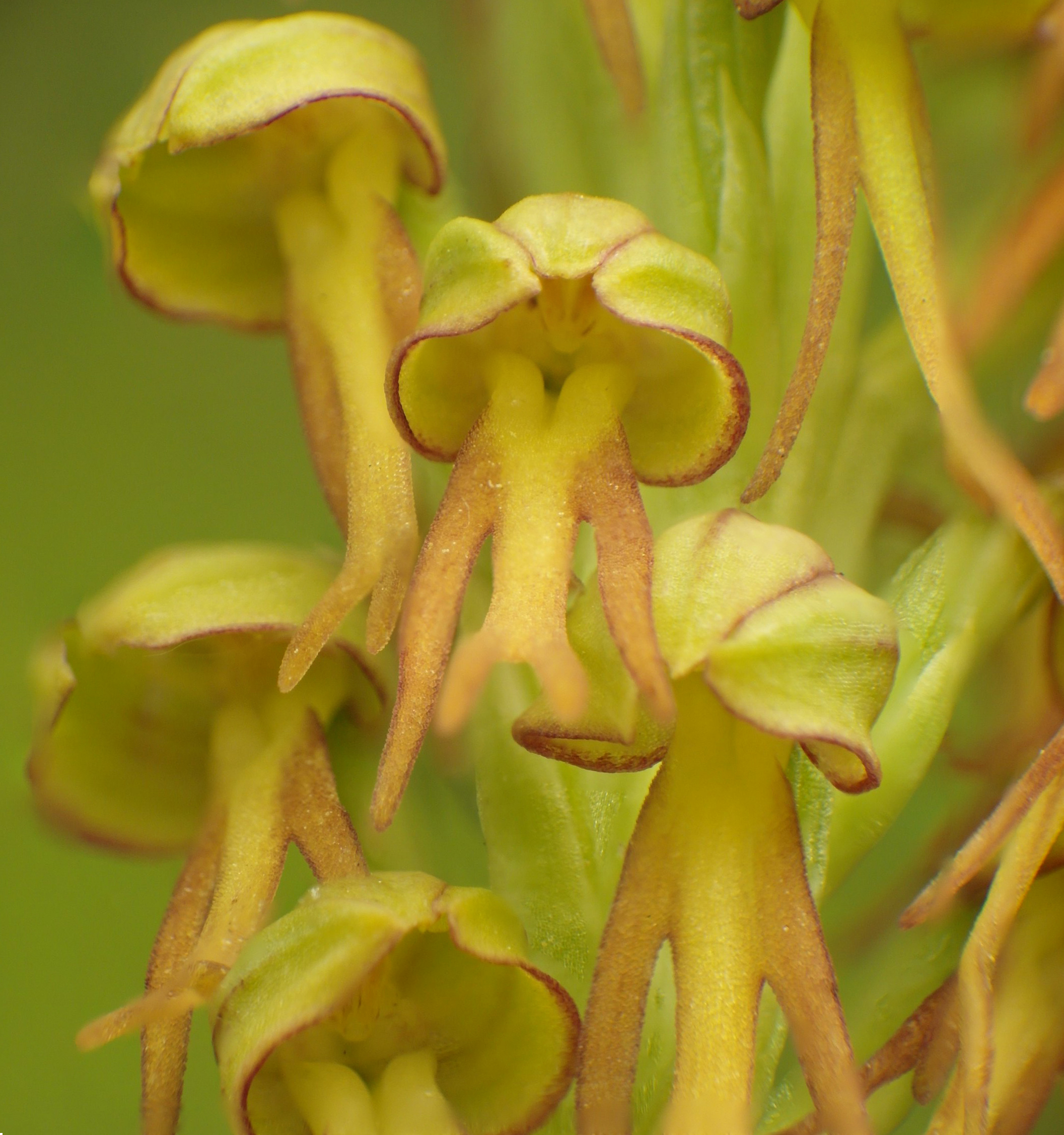
- Flowers

Scientific classification
- Kingdom: Plantae
- Clade: Tracheophytes
- Clade: Angiosperms
- Clade: Monocots
- Order: Asparagales
- Family: Orchidaceae
- Subfamily: Orchidoideae
- Genus: Orchis
- Species: O. anthropophora

Binomial name
- Orchis anthropophora (L.) All.

Synonyms
- Ophrys anthropophora L.; Aceras anthropophorum (L.) R.Br.; Arachnites anthropophora (L.) F.W.Schmidt; Satyrium anthropophorum (L.) Pers.; Loroglossum anthropophorum (L.) Rich.; Himantoglossum anthropophorum (L.) Spreng.; Serapias anthropophora (L.) Jundz.

= Orchis anthropophora =

Species of orchid

Orchis anthropophora (formerly Aceras anthropophorum), the man orchid, is a European species of orchid whose flowers resemble a human figure. The head is formed by the petals and sepals, and the suspended torso and limbs by the lobes of the labellum. It usually grows in calcareous grassland.

== Description ==
The man orchid is a herbaceous perennial, growing to a height of 20 to 40 cm (7.9 to 16 in). A basal rosette of 5 cm (2.0 in) lanceolate leaves develops from a tuber 6 cm (2.4 in) in diameter, and between April and June a central flower spike is produced bearing up to fifty small, stemless flowers – the flowers vary from greenish, with a yellow-green labellum, to green, streaked and marked with purple.

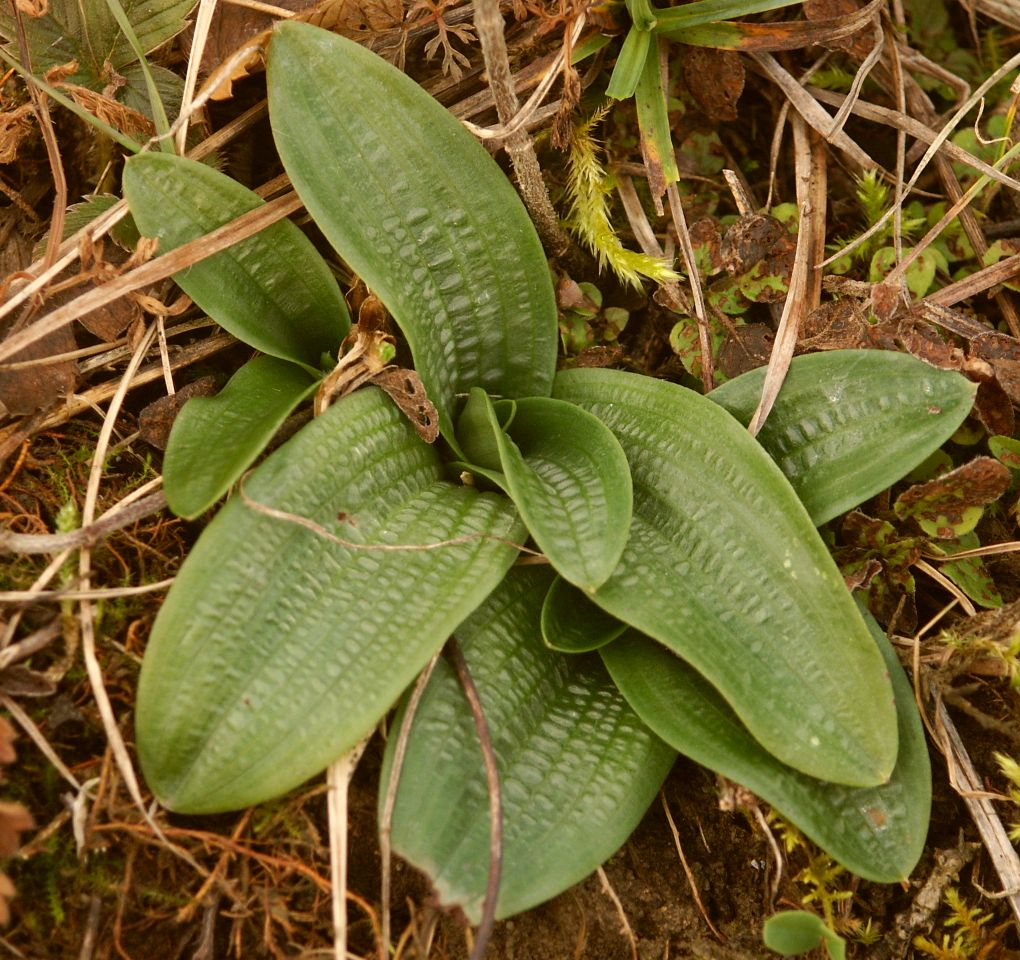
Leaf rosette before flowering

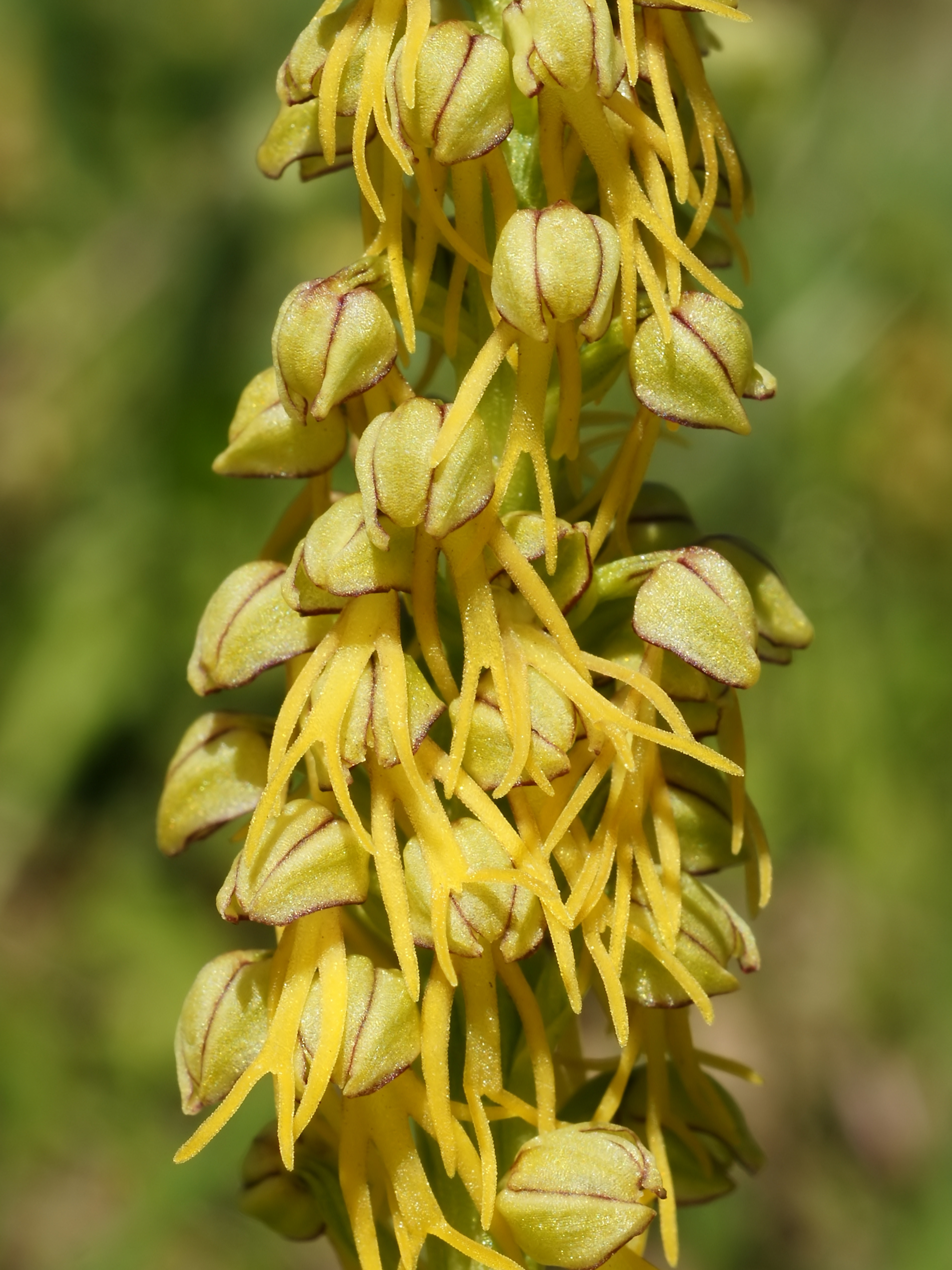

== Habitat ==
Orchis anthropophora favours moderately sunny meadows on well-drained, often calcareous soil. It is to be found around the Mediterranean area, and in central and western Europe as far north as southern England. It also grows in alpine areas, but not at high altitude.

It is native to Great Britain, central Europe (Austria, Belgium, Germany, the Netherlands, and Switzerland), southwestern Europe (the Balearic Islands, Corsica, France, Portugal, Sardinia, and Spain), southeastern Europe (Albania, Greece, Italy, Crete, Sicily, and countries of the former Yugoslavia), northern Africa (Algeria, Morocco, and Tunisia), and western Asia (Cyprus, East Aegean Islands, Lebanon, Syria, and Turkey).

== See also ==
- Naked man orchid
