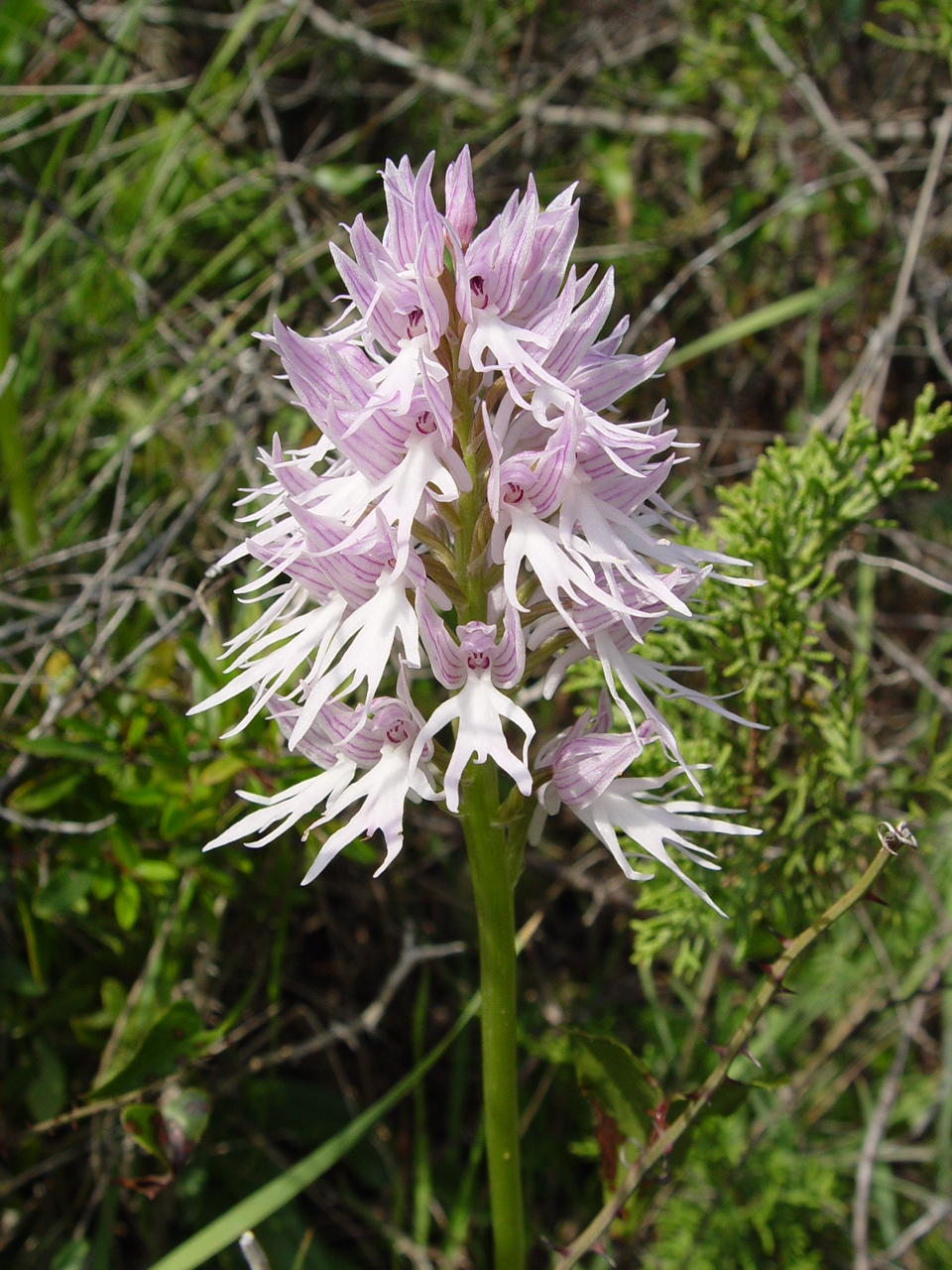
- Orchis italica

Scientific classification
- Kingdom: Plantae
- Clade: Embryophytes
- Clade: Tracheophytes
- Clade: Spermatophytes
- Clade: Angiosperms
- Clade: Monocots
- Order: Asparagales
- Family: Orchidaceae
- Subfamily: Orchidoideae
- Subtribe: Orchidinae
- Genus: Orchis; Tourn. ex L. 1753

Type species
- Orchis militaris L. Sp. Pl.: 943, 1753

Species
- See text

Synonyms
- Abrochis Neck.; Zoophora Bernh.; Strateuma Salisb.; Aceras R.Br. in W.T.Aiton; × Orchiaceras E.G.Camus; Androrchis D.Tyteca & E.Klein

= Orchis =

Genus of orchids

Orchis is a genus in the orchid family (Orchidaceae), occurring mainly in Europe and Northwest Africa, and ranging as far as Tibet, Mongolia, and Xinjiang. The name is from the Ancient Greek ὄρχις (órkhis), meaning "testicle", from the appearance of the paired subterranean tuberoids.

== Description ==
These terrestrial orchids have root tubers instead of pseudobulbs. They are extremely diverse in appearance. They produce an erect stem. The inflorescence is a cylindrical to globular spike, 5–15 cm (2–6 in) long, with yellow, red to purple flowers. They start flowering at the base, slowly progressing upwards, except for the monkey orchid (Orchis simia), which flowers in reverse order.

== Taxonomy ==
The original genus Orchis used to contain more than 1,300 names. Since it was polyphyletic, it was divided by Pridgeon et al. into several new genera (see Reference), including Ponerorchis, Schizodium, and Steveniella.

=== Species ===
As of September 2024, Plants of the World Online accepted 22 species, along with a number of subspecies:

- Orchis adenocheila Czerniak. (Iran)
- Orchis anatolica Boiss. (including Orchis troodi (Renz) P.Delforge) – Anatolian orchid (Cyprus, Turkey, Southern Aegean Islands, Syria, Lebanon, Israel, Palestine, Iran)
- Orchis anthropophora (L.) All. (Western Europe to Mediterranean)
- Orchis brancifortii Biv. (Southern Italy, Sicilia, Sardinia)
- Orchis canariensis Lindl.
- Orchis deuterodelamainii J.M.H.Shaw
- Orchis galilaea (Bornm. & M.Schulze) Schltr. (Turkey, Syria, Lebanon, Israel, Palestine)
- Orchis italica Poir. – Man orchid, Italian orchid (Mediterranean)
- Orchis laeta Steinh.
- Orchis mascula (L.) L. – Early purple orchid, (N. & C. Europe to Iran, Canary Islands)
  - Orchis mascula subsp. ichnusae Corrias
  - Orchis mascula subsp. laxifloriformis Rivas Goday & B.Rodr.
  - Orchis mascula subsp. mascula
  - Orchis mascula subsp. scopulorum (Summerh.) H.Sund. ex H.Kretzschmar, Eccarius & H.Dietr.
  - Orchis mascula subsp. speciosa (Mutel) Hegi
- Orchis militaris L. – Military orchid (Europe to Mongolia)
  - Orchis militaris subsp. militaris
  - Orchis militaris subsp. stevenii (Rchb.f.) B.Baumann & al.
- Orchis olbiensis Reut. ex Gren. (NW. Italy - to NW. Africa)
- Orchis pallens L. – Pale-flowered orchid (Europe to Caucasus)
- Orchis patens Desf. (Central Mediterranean to NW. Africa)
  - Orchis patens subsp. canariensis (Lindl.) Asch. & Graebn.
  - Orchis patens subsp. patens
- Orchis pauciflora Ten. (Albania, Corsica, Greece, Italy, Crete and Yugoslavia)
- Orchis provincialis Balb. ex Lam. & DC. (SC. & S. Europe to Caucasus, NW Africa)
- Orchis punctulata Steven ex Lindl. – Small-dotted orchid (SE. Europe to W. Asia)
- Orchis purpurea Huds. – Lady orchid, purple orchid (Europe to Caucasus, Algeria)
  - Orchis purpurea subsp. caucasica (Regel) B.Baumann & al.
  - Orchis purpurea subsp. purpurea
- Orchis quadripunctata Cirillo ex Ten. – Four-spotted orchid (Sardinia to Eastern Mediterranean)
- Orchis simia Lam. – Monkey orchid (Europe to Iran, N. Africa)
  - Orchis simia subsp. simia
  - Orchis simia subsp. taubertiana (B.Baumann & H.Baumann) Kreutz
- Orchis sitiaca (Renz) P.Delforge
- Orchis spitzelii Saut. ex W.D.J.Koch – Spitzel's orchid (Sweden (Gotland), E. Spain to Caucasus, NW. Africa)
  - Orchis spitzelii subsp. cazorlensis (Lacaita) D.Rivera & Lopez Velez
  - Orchis spitzelii subsp. nitidifolia (W.P.Teschner) Soó
  - Orchis spitzelii subsp. spitzelii

=== Natural hybrids ===
As of June 2014, the World Checklist of Selected Plant Families accepted 37 hybrid species, along with a number of hybrid subspecies:

- Orchis × algeriensis B.Baumann & H.Baumann (O. patens × O. spitzelii)
- Orchis × angusticruris Franch. (O. purpurea × O. simia) (Europe to Caucasus)
  - Orchis × angusticruris nothosubsp. angusticruris (O. purpurea subsp. purpurea × O. simia)
  - Orchis × angusticruris nothosubsp. transcaucasica B.Baumann & al. (O. purpurea subsp. caucasuca × O. simia)
- Orchis × apollinaris W.Rossi & al. (O. italica × O. simia) (Italy)
- Orchis × aurunca W.Rossi & Minut. (O. pauciflora × O. provincialis)
- Orchis × bergonii Nanteuil (O. anthropophora × O. simia) (Western Mediterranean)
- Orchis × beyrichii (Rchb.f.) A.Kern. (O. militaris × O. simia) (Europe to Turkey)
  - Orchis × beyrichii nothosubsp. beyrichii (O. militaris subsp. militaris × O. simia)
  - Orchis × beyrichii nothosubsp. golestanica (Renz) H.Kretzschmar, Eccarius & H.Dietr. (O. militaris subsp. stevenii × O. simia)
- Orchis × bispurium (G.Keller) H.Kretzschmar, Eccarius & H.Dietr. (O. anthropophora × O. militaris × O. purpurea)
- Orchis × bivonae Tod. (O. anthropophora × O. italica) (Southern Europe)
- Orchis × buelii Wildh. (O. provincialis × O. quadripunctata)
- Orchis × caesii De Angelis & Fumanti (O. italica × O. purpurea)
- Orchis × calliantha Renz & Taubenheim (O. punctulata × O. simia) (Turkey)
- Orchis × chabalensis B.Baumann & al. (O. militaris subsp. stevenii × O. punctulata)
- Orchis × colemanii Cortesi (O. mascula × O. pauciflora)
- Orchis × fallax (De Not.) Willk. (O. patens × O. provincialis)
- Orchis × fitzii Hautz. (O. anatolica × O. mascula) (Turkey)
- Orchis × hybrida (Lindl.) Boenn. ex Rchb. (O. militaris × O. purpurea) (Europe)
- Orchis × klopfensteiniae P.Delforge (O. pallens × O. spitzelii) (SW Europe)
- Orchis × kretzschmariorum B.Baumann & H.Baumann (O. anatolica × O. provincialis)
- Orchis × ligustica Ruppert (O. mascula × O. patens) (Mediterranean)
- Orchis × loreziana Brügger(O. mascula × O. pallens) (Europe)
  - Orchis × loreziana nothosubsp. kisslingii (Beck) Potucek (O. mascula subsp. speciosa × O. pallens) (Eastern Europe)
  - Orchis × loreziana nothosubsp. loreziana (O. mascula subsp. mascula × O. pallens) (Central Europe)
- Orchis × lucensis Antonetti & Bertolini (O. pauciflora × O. simia)
- Orchis × macra Lindl. (O. anthropophora × O. purpurea) (Europe)
- Orchis × orphanidesii (E.G.Camus) B.Bock (O. anthropophora × O. mascula)
- Orchis × palanchonii G.Foelsche & W.Foelsche (O. olbiensis × O. pauciflora)
- Orchis × penzigiana A.Camus (O. mascula × O. provincialis)
  - Orchis × penzigiana nothosubsp. jailae (Soó) H.Kretzschmar, Eccarius & H.Dietr. (O. mascula subsp. speciosa × O. provincialis)
  - Orchis × penzigiana nothosubsp. penzigiana (O. mascula subsp. mascula × O. provincialis)
  - Orchis × penzigiana nothosubsp. sardoa Scrugli & M.P.Grasso (O. mascula subsp. ichnusae × O. provincialis)
- Orchis × permixta Soó (O. mascula subsp. signifera × O. pallens × O. provincialis) (Crimea)
- Orchis × petterssonii G.Keller ex Pett. (O. mascula × O. spitzelii) (Europe, NW Africa)
  - Orchis × petterssonii nothosubsp. incantata (P.Delforge) H.Kretzschmar, Eccarius & H.Dietr. (O. mascula subsp. laxifloriformis × O. spitzelii subsp. cazorlensis)
  - Orchis × petterssonii nothosubsp. petterssonii (O. mascula subsp. mascula × O. spitzelii subsp. cazorlensis)
- Orchis × plessidiaca Renz (O. pallens × O. provincialis) (SE Europe to Krym)
- Orchis × pseudoanatolica H.Fleischm. (O. pauciflora × O. quadripunctata) (SE Europe)
- Orchis × schebestae Griebl (O. mascula × O. quadripunctata)
- Orchis × serraniana P.Delforge (O. mascula subsp. laxifloriformis × O. olbiensis)
- Orchis × sezikiana B.Baumann & H.Baumann (O. anatolica × O. quadripunctata)
- Orchis × spuria Rchb.f. (O. anthropophora × O. militaris) (Europe)
- Orchis × thriftiensis Renz (O. anatolica × O. pauciflora)
- Orchis × tochniana Kreutz & Scraton (O. italica × O. punctulata) (Cyprus)
- Orchis × willingiorum B.Baumann & H.Baumann (O. provincialis × O. spitzelii)
- Orchis × wulffiana Soó (O. punctulata × O. purpurea) (Crimea to caucasus)
  - Orchis × wulffiana nothosubsp. suckowii (Kümpel) B.Baumann & al. (O. punctulata × O. purpurea subsp. caucasica)
  - Orchis × wulffiana nothosubsp. wulffiana (O. punctulata × O. purpurea subsp. purpurea)

=== Intergeneric hybrids ===
- Orchiophrys (Ophrys x Orchis)
- Orchiserapias (Orchis x Serapias)

== See also ==
- Salep
- List of taxa named after human genitals
