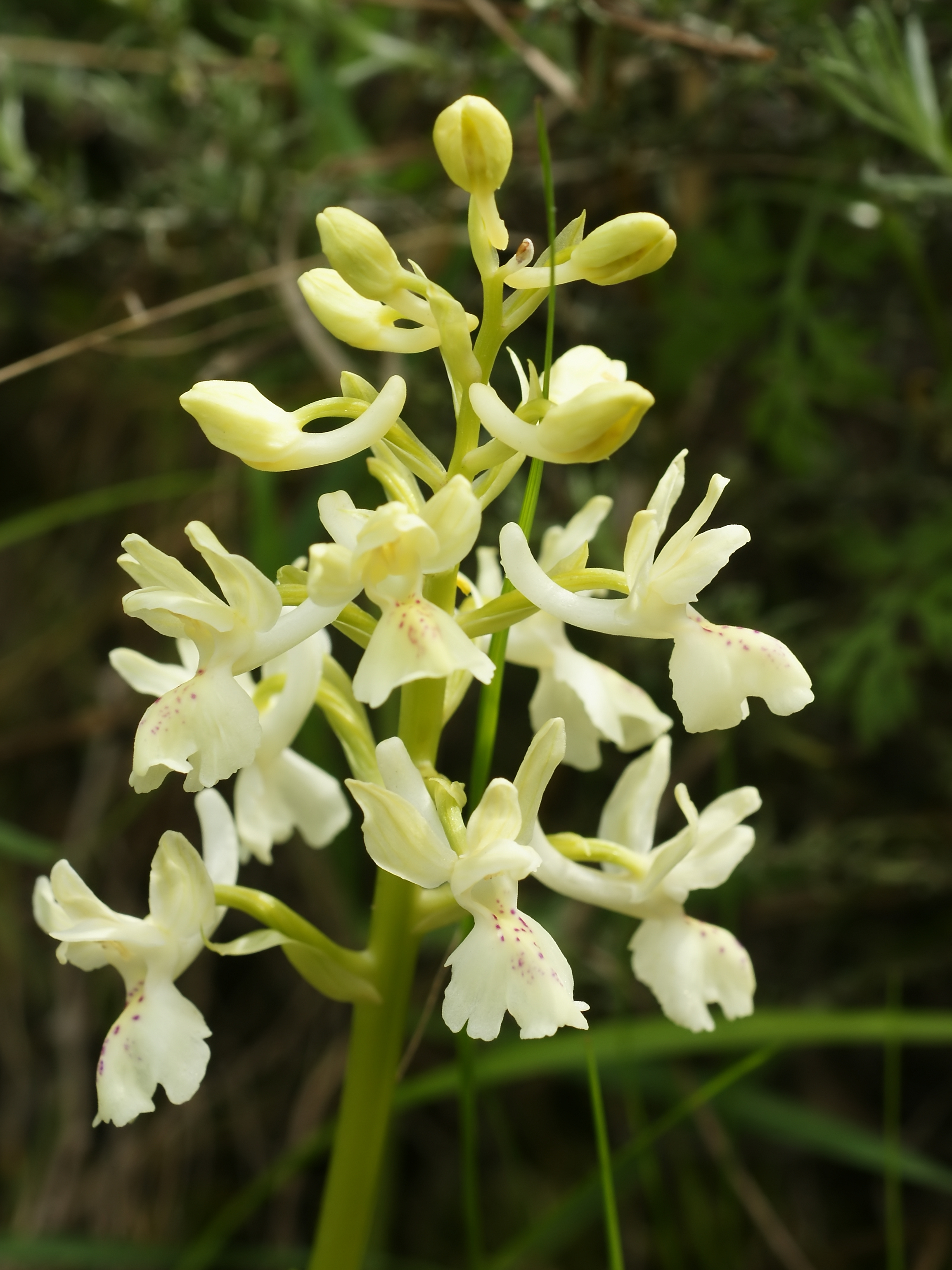
- Flower of Orchis provincialis

Scientific classification
- Kingdom: Plantae
- Clade: Tracheophytes
- Clade: Angiosperms
- Clade: Monocots
- Order: Asparagales
- Family: Orchidaceae
- Subfamily: Orchidoideae
- Genus: Orchis
- Species: O. provincialis

Binomial name
- Orchis provincialis Balb. ex Lam. & DC.

Synonyms
- Androrchis provincialis (Balb. ex Lam. & DC.) D.Tyteca & E.Klein; Androrchis provincialis var. rubra (Chabert) W.Foelsche & Jakely; Androrchis provincialis var. variegata (Chabert) W.Foelsche & Jakely; Orchis cyrilli Ten. 1820; Orchis laeta Steinh. 1838; Orchis leucostachys Griseb. 1840; Orchis mascula Alsch. 1832; Orchis olbiensis Ardoino ex Moggr. 1864; Orchis pallens Savi; Orchis provincialis var. laeta (Steinh.) Maire & Weiller 1959; Orchis pseudopallens Tod. 1842

= Orchis provincialis =

Provence orchis

Species of orchid

Orchis provincialis, the Provence orchid, is a species of orchid in the genus Orchis.

== Description ==
Orchis provincialis is a herbaceous plant 20–40 centimetres (7.9–15.7 in) high. The 4-5 basal leaves are oblong-lanceolate, with a length of about 8 cm and arranged in a rosette, the color is green with purplish brown spots. The cauline leaves are sheathing the stem, with yellowish lanceolate bracts. The inflorescence comprises 5 to 30 small flowers. Their color varies from creamy white or pale yellow to various shades of pink and purple in some varieties. The lateral sepals are ovate and erect, the median sepal is slightly leaning forward. The labellum is trilobed, with small spots from orange to purple on the median lobe. The white spur is cylindrical and curved upward, longer than the ovary. The gynostegium is short, obtuse, with pale yellow pollen. This orchid blooms from March to June.

== Distribution ==
The species has a Mediterranean distribution and it is widespread from north-western Africa, south-central and southern Europe to the Caucasus. It is native to: Albania, Bulgaria, Corse, East Aegean Is., France, Greece, Italy, Kriti, Krym, North Caucasus, Portugal, Sardegna, Sicilia, Spain, Switzerland, Transcaucasus, Turkey and Yugoslavia.

== Habitat ==
Orchis provincialis prefers slightly acidic soils of grassland, scrub and woodland, at an altitude of 0–1,750 metres (0–5,741 ft) above sea level.

== Taxonomy ==
It was first described by Jean-Baptiste de Lamarck & Augustin Pyrame de Candolle and then widely published by Giovanni Battista Balbis in Syn. Pl. Fl. Gall. on page 169 in 1806.

== Gallery ==
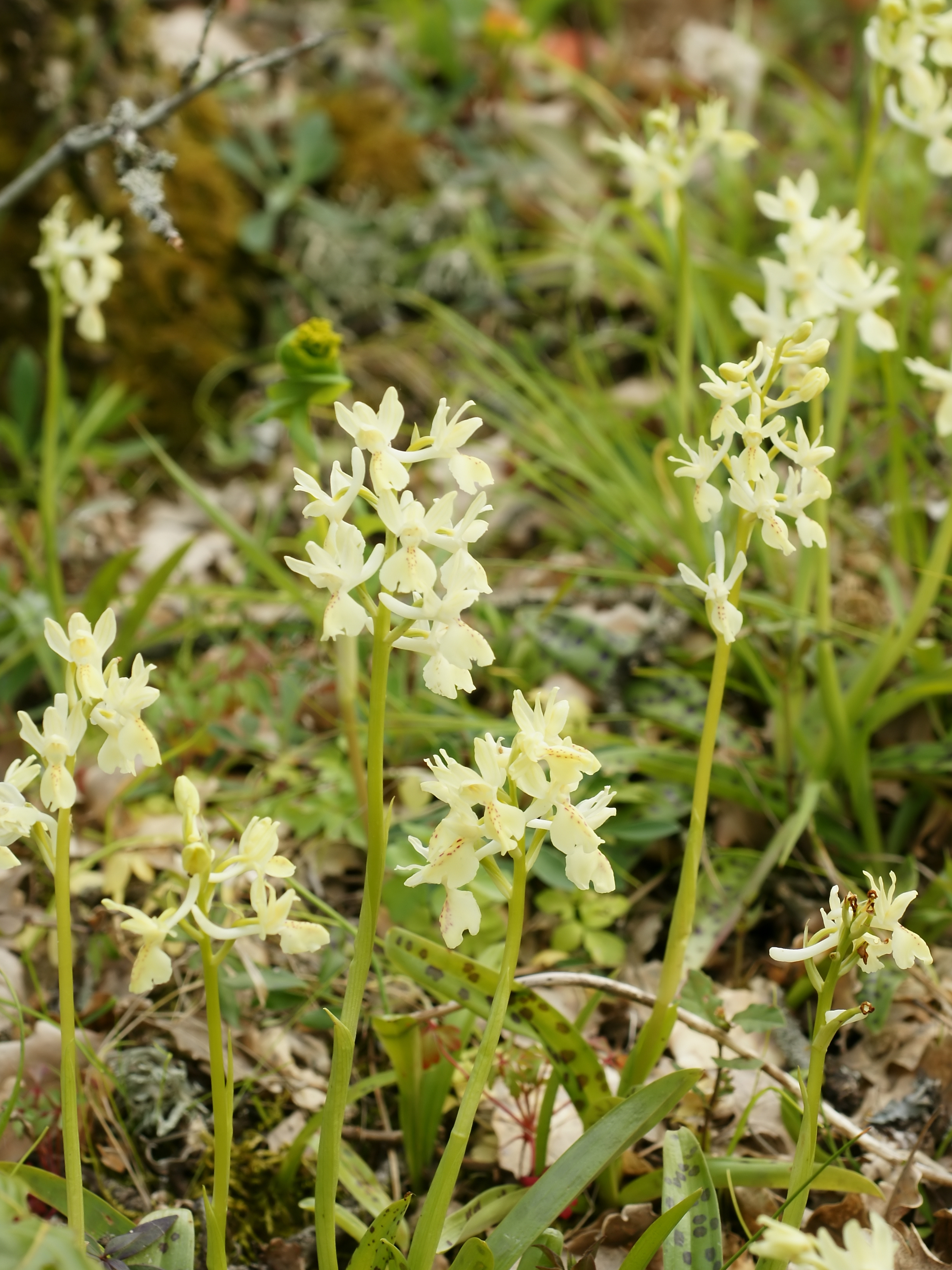
Plants

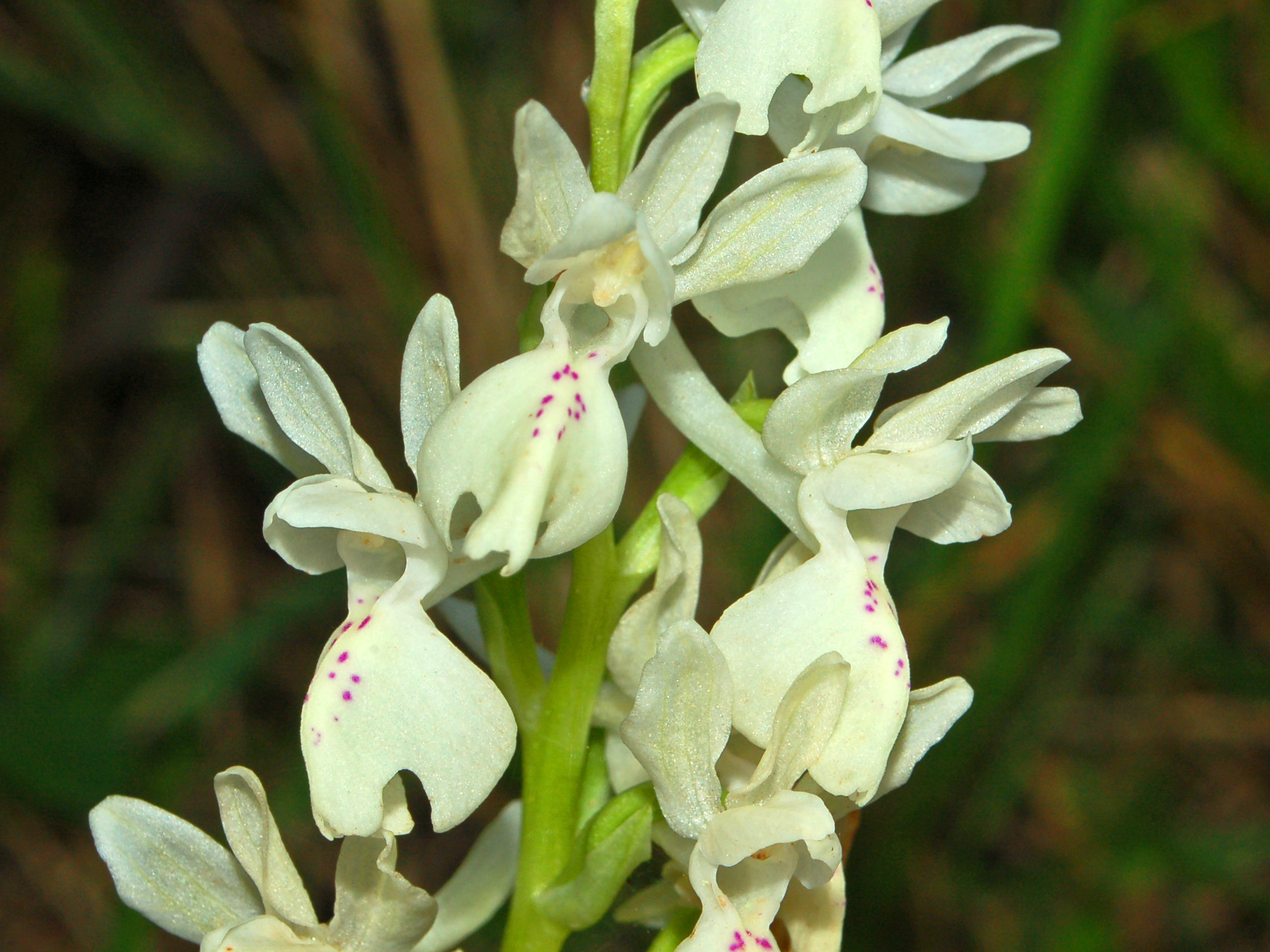
Flowers

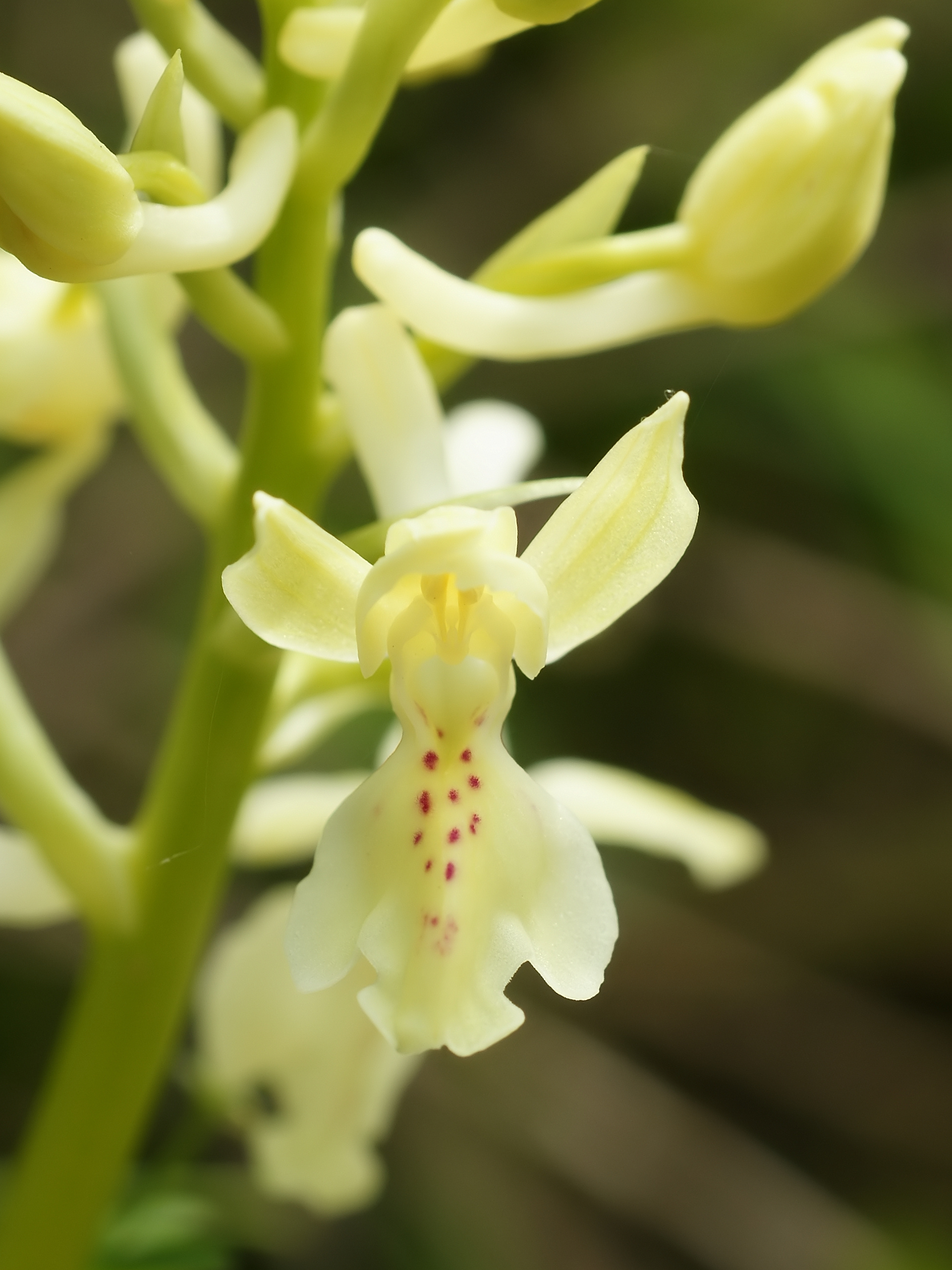
Flower

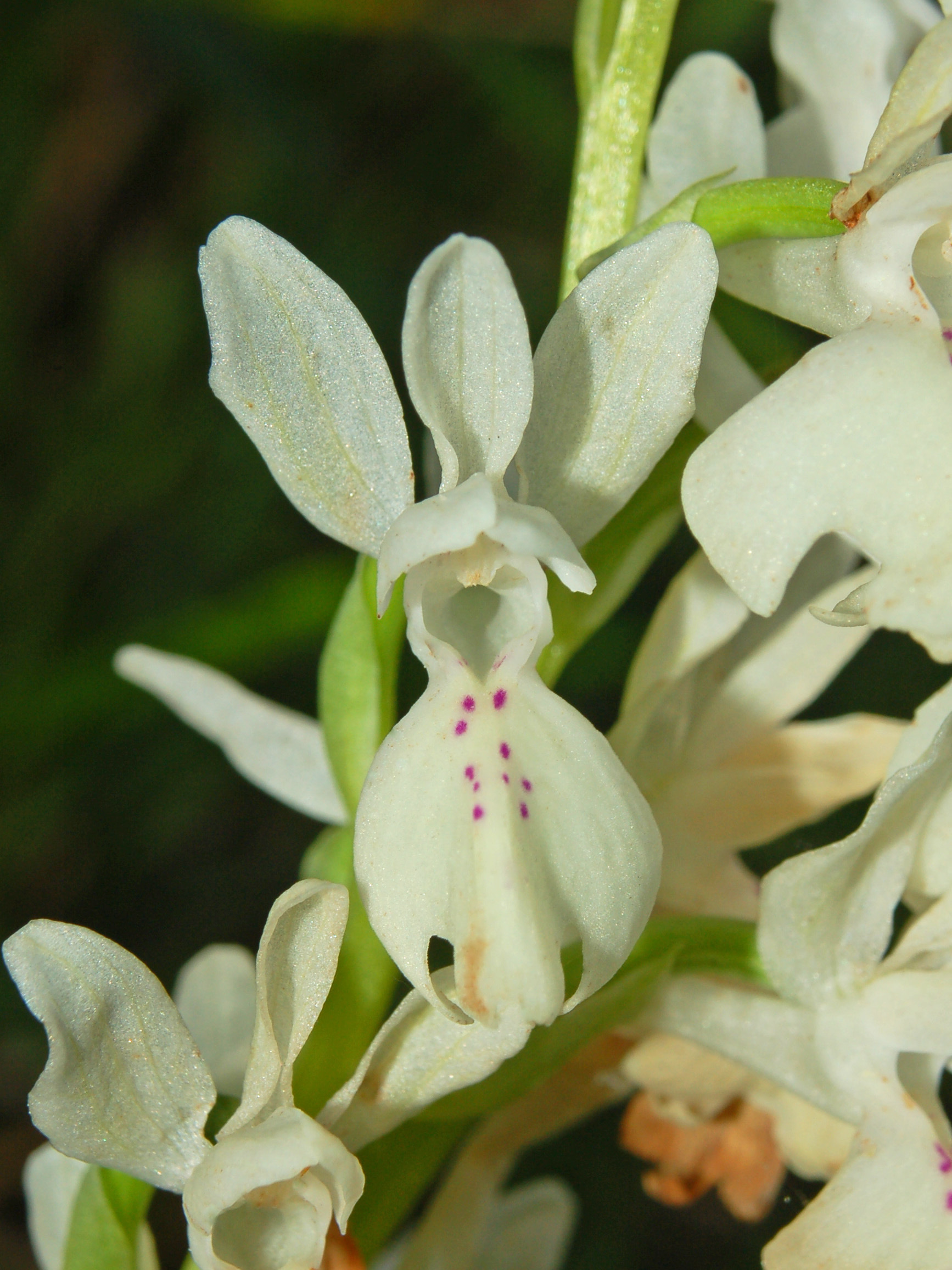
Close-up on a flower

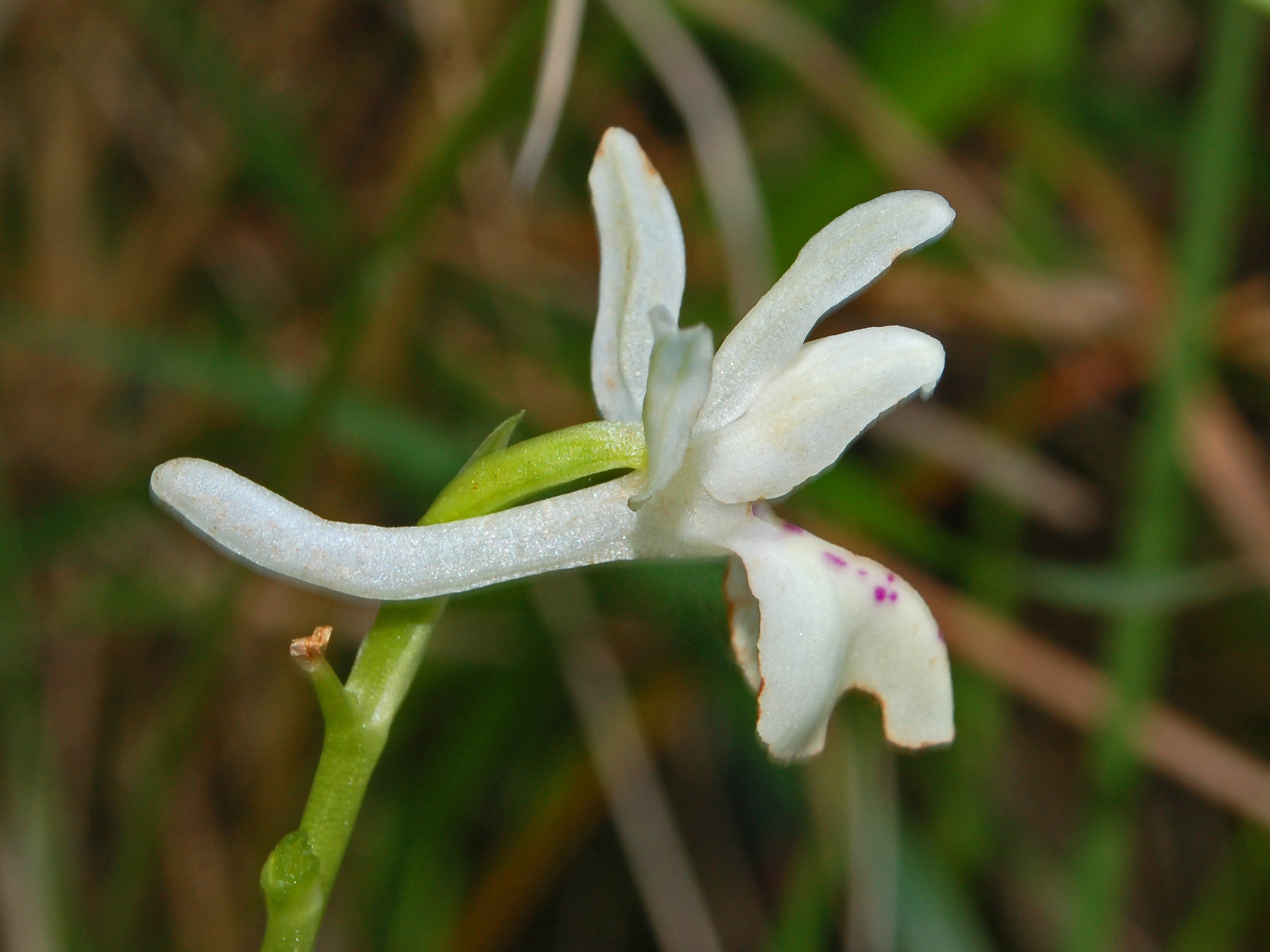
Close-up on a flower

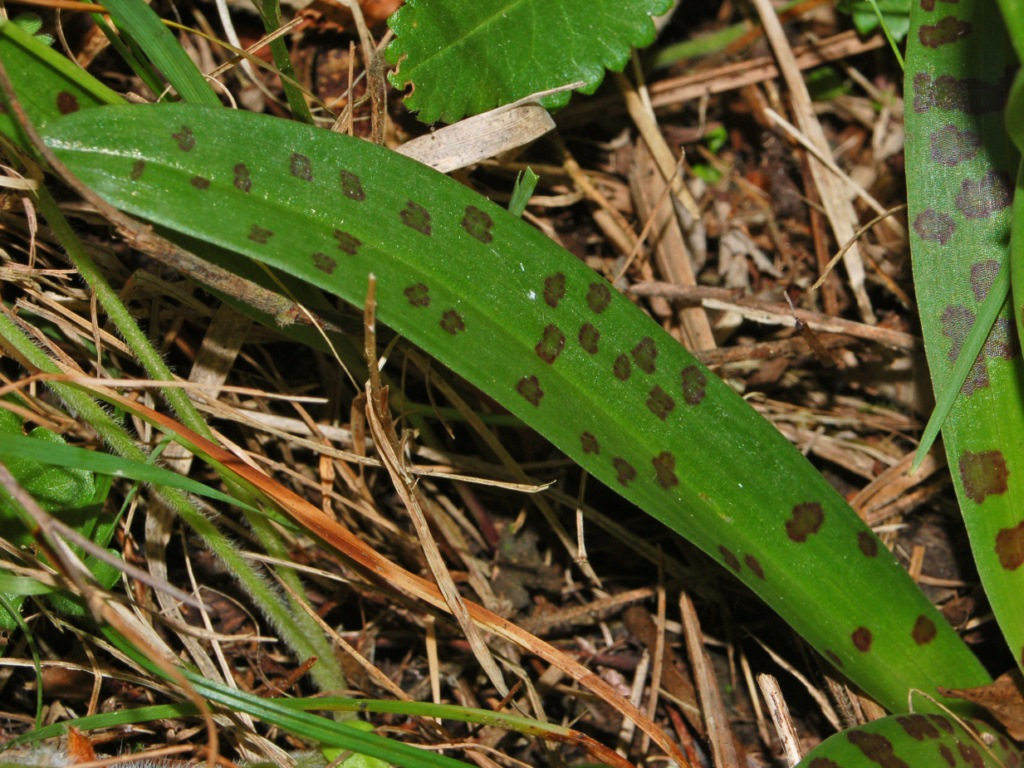
Leaf

== Other sources ==
- Pierre Delforge - Orchids of Europe, North Africa And the Middle East - 2006, Timber Press
- Pignatti S. - Flora d'Italia (3 voll.) - Edagricole – 1982, Vol. III
- Tutin, T.G. et al. - Flora Europaea, second edition - 1993
