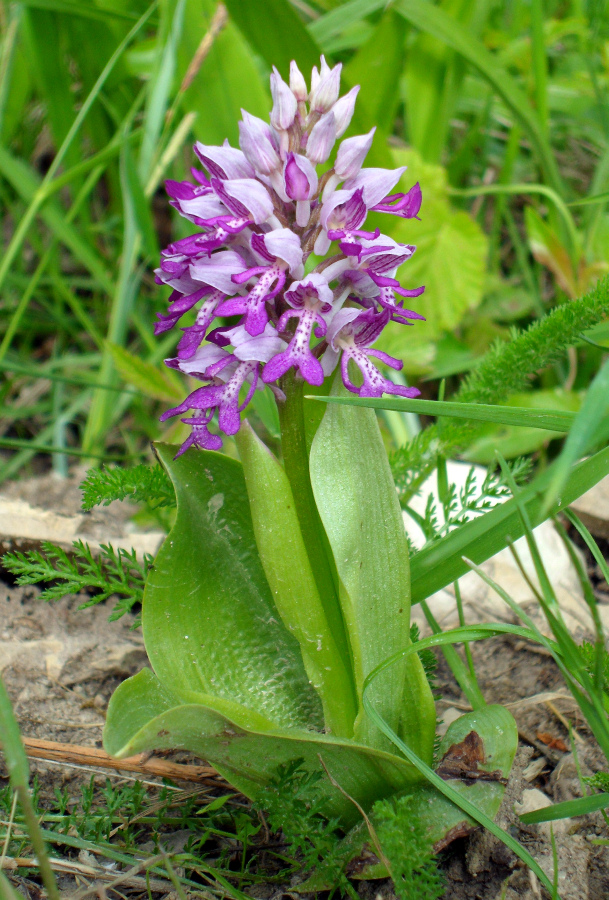

Scientific classification
- Kingdom: Plantae
- Clade: Tracheophytes
- Clade: Angiosperms
- Clade: Monocots
- Order: Asparagales
- Family: Orchidaceae
- Subfamily: Orchidoideae
- Genus: Orchis
- Species: O. militaris

Binomial name
- Orchis militaris L.

Synonyms
- Of O. militaris subsp. militaris: Orchis cinerea Schrank; Orchis galeata Poir.; Orchis militaris subsp. galeata (Poir.) Bonnier & Layens; Orchis militaris subsp. major Ehrh.; Orchis militaris var. tenuifrons P.D.Sell; Orchis mimusops Thuill.; Orchis nervata Marchand; Orchis rivini Gouan; Zoophora atropurpurea Bernh.; Zoophora rubella Bernh.; Of O. militaris subsp. stevenii: Orchis punctulata subsp. stevenii (Rchb.f.) H.Sund.; Orchis raddeana Regel; Orchis simia subsp. stevenii (Rchb.f.) E.G.Camus; Orchis stevenii Rchb.f.

= Orchis militaris =

Military orchid

Species of orchid

Orchis militaris, the military orchid, is a species of orchid native to Europe. It is the type species of the genus Orchis.

== Description ==
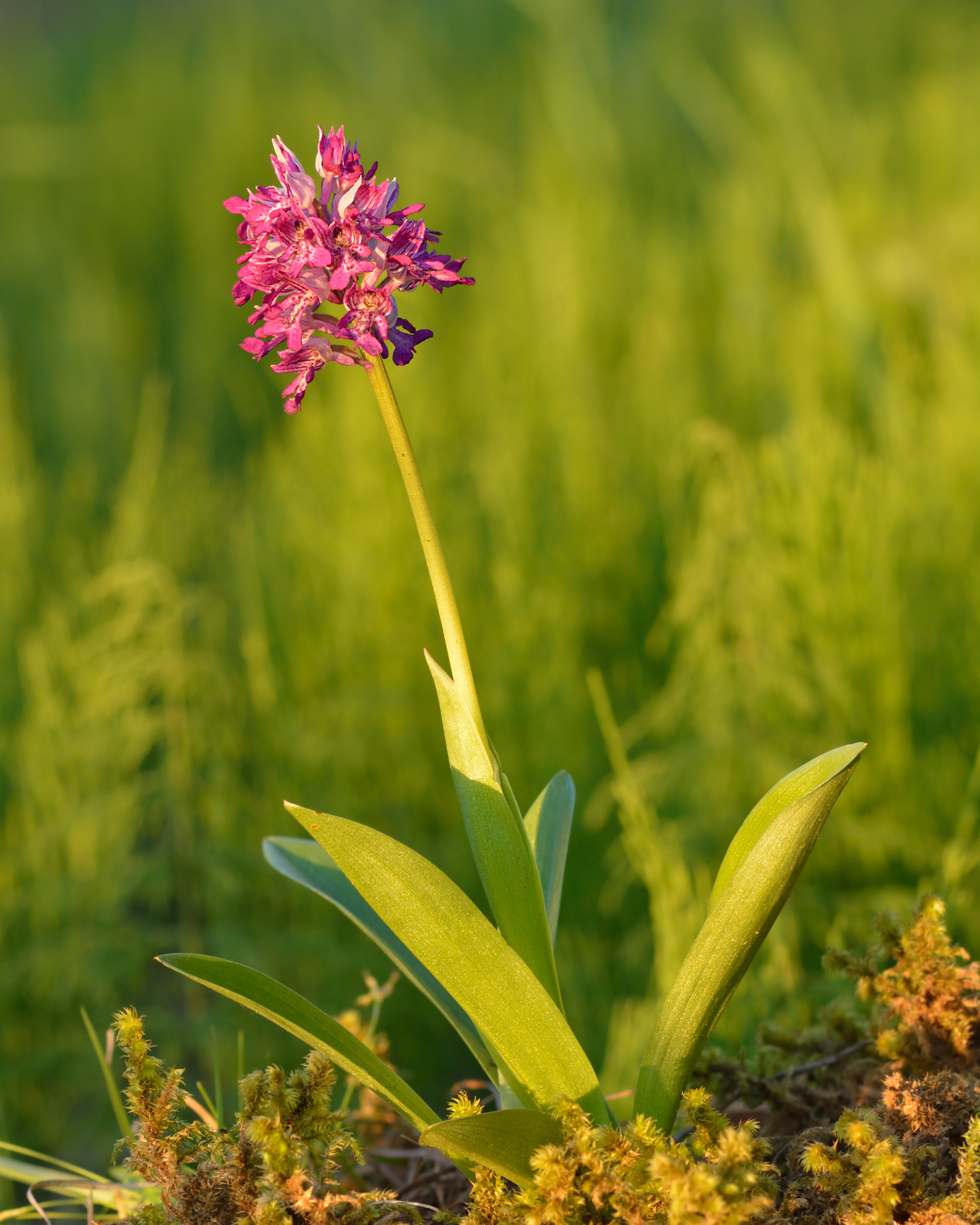

This plant grows to a height of 20 to 50 cm with a robust stem with rather drawn up oblong basal leaves. The inflorescence forms a purplish dense cone consisting of from 10 to 40 flowers. In each flower the sepals and side petals are gathered together to form a pointed "helmet" (whence it gets its name), a lilac colour outside and a veined purple colour inside. The central tongue finishes in two lobes separated by a tooth.

Depending on the location, it flowers from April to June.

== Taxonomy ==
Orchis militaris was first described by Carl Linnaeus in 1753. Orchis militaris Poir.. is a synonym of Orchis italica. Two subspecies are recognized:

- Orchis militaris subsp. militaris – widespread in Eurasia, from Britain to Mongolia
- Orchis militaris subsp. stevenii (Rchb.f.) B.Baumann, H.Baumann, R.Lorenz & Ruedi Peter – Iran, Crimea, North Caucasus, the Transcaucasus, Turkey

== Distribution and habitat ==
It is well distributed around Europe, reaching as far north as southern Sweden, but rather rare in the Mediterranean areas. It extends east across the Palearctic to Siberia. It prefers full light on a dry calcareous substrate, for example, unfertilized lawns, meadows, edges and light woods up to 2000 m in altitude.

It is extremely rare in Britain and a protected species, occurring only at the Rex Graham nature reserve in Suffolk and the Chiltern Hills in Buckinghamshire.

== Uses ==
Orchis militaris contains the nutritious polysaccharide glucomannan, and is one of the original species of orchid whose ground-up roots are used to make the drink salep.

== Chemistry ==
Orchinol is a phenanthrenoid that can be isolated from infected O. militaris.
