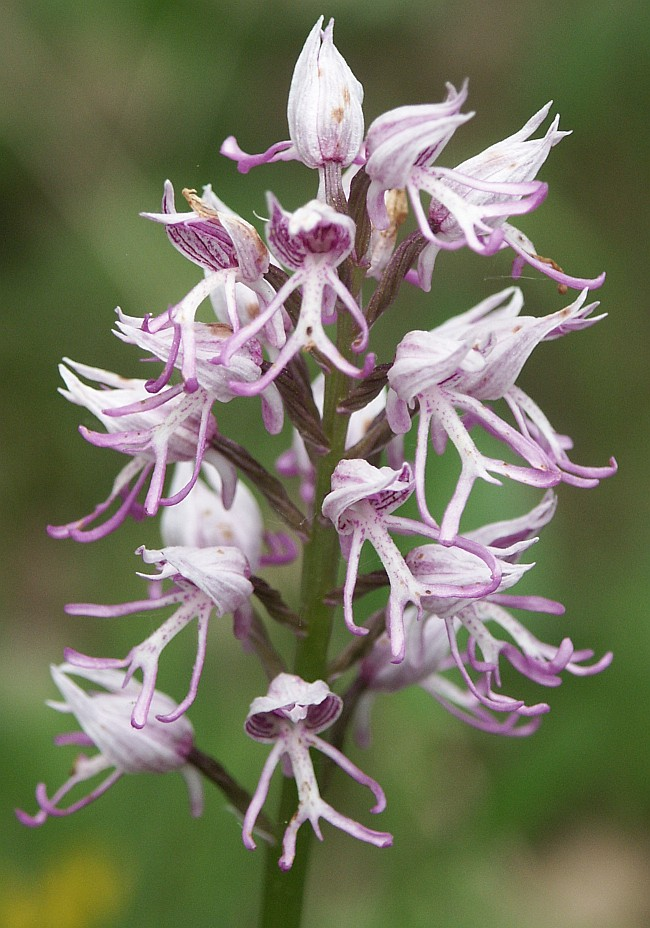

Scientific classification
- Kingdom: Plantae
- Clade: Tracheophytes
- Clade: Angiosperms
- Clade: Monocots
- Order: Asparagales
- Family: Orchidaceae
- Subfamily: Orchidoideae
- Genus: Orchis
- Species: O. simia

Binomial name
- Orchis simia Lam., 1779

= Orchis simia =

Monkey orchid

Species of orchid

Orchis simia, commonly known as the monkey orchid, is a greyish pink to reddish species of the genus Orchis. It gets its common name from its lobed lip which mimics the general shape of a monkey's body.

The range of the species is central and southern Europe, including southern England, the Mediterranean, Russia, Asia Minor, Caucasus, northern Iraq, Iran to Turkmenistan and northern Africa where it occurs in grassland, garrigue, scrub and open woodland, chiefly on limestone soils. It is absent from the Balearic Islands, Corsica and Sardinia. On Cyprus the species can be categorized as threatened, and it became a protected species in the UK in 1975 under the Conservation of Wild Creatures and Wild Plants Act.

== Gallery ==
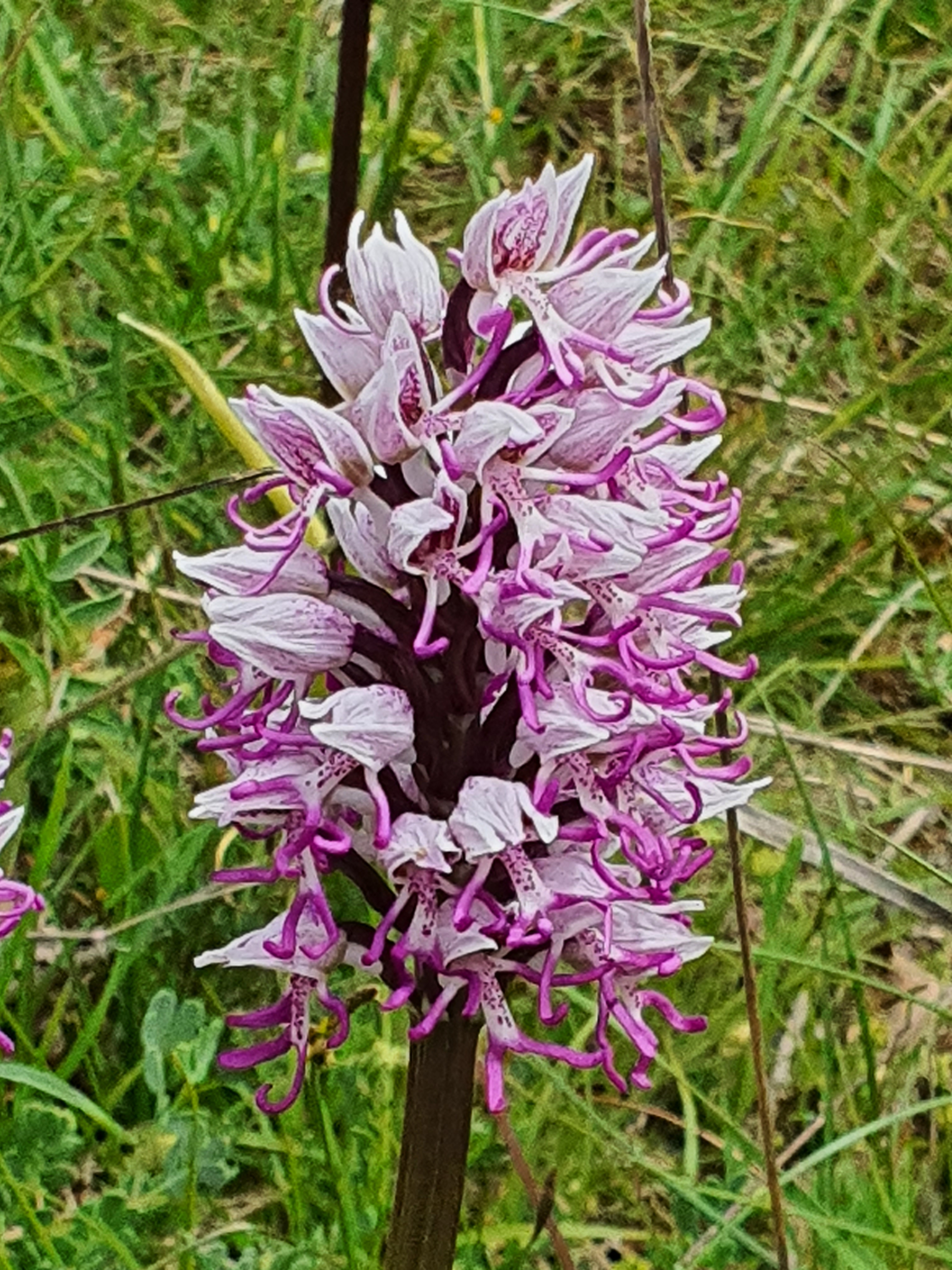
Wild monkey orchid (Orchis simia), Hérault, France
