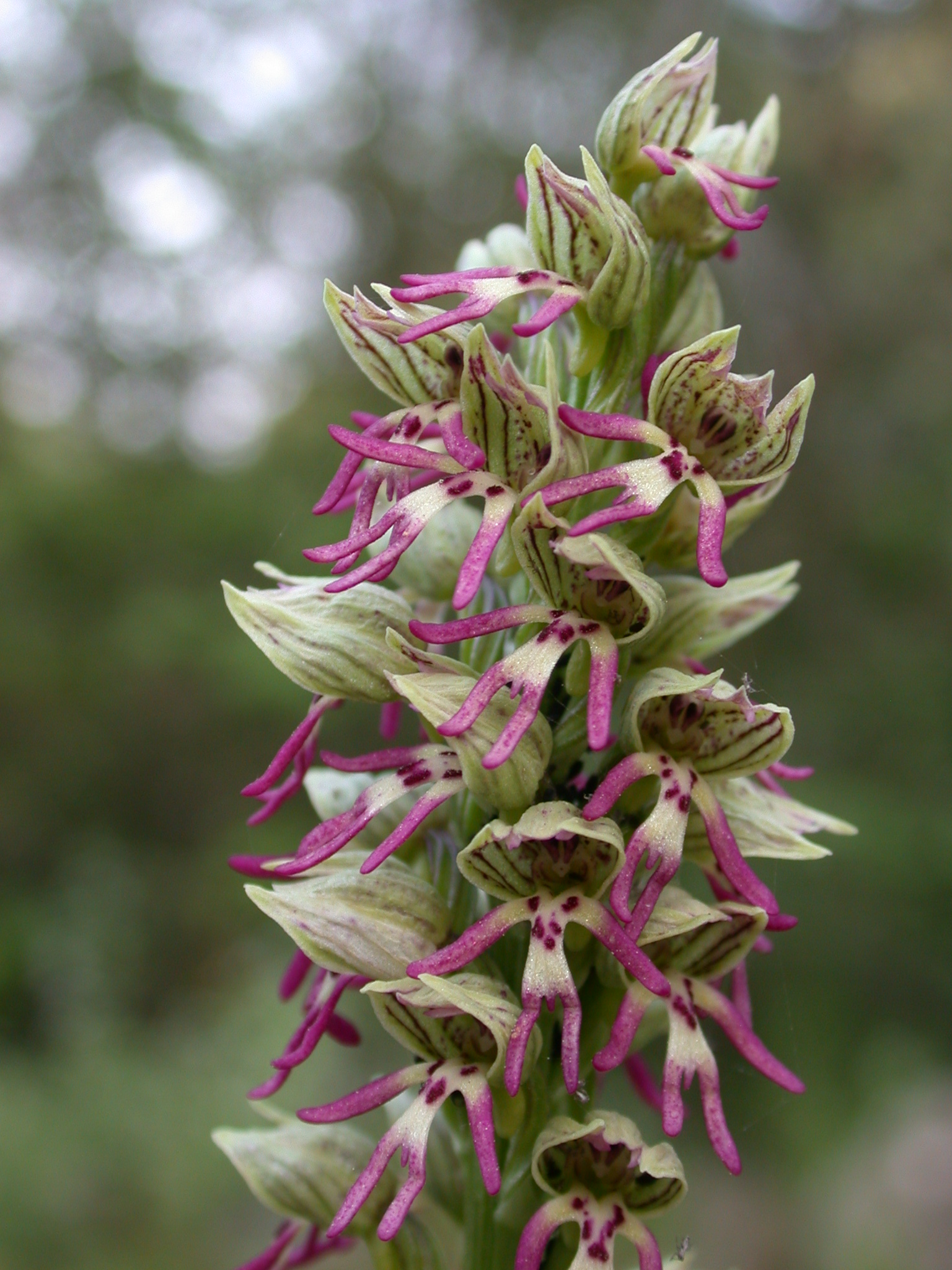
- Flower of Orchis galilaea

Scientific classification
- Kingdom: Plantae
- Clade: Tracheophytes
- Clade: Angiosperms
- Clade: Monocots
- Order: Asparagales
- Family: Orchidaceae
- Subfamily: Orchidoideae
- Genus: Orchis
- Species: O. galilaea

Binomial name
- Orchis galilaea (Bornm. & M.Schulze) Schltr.

Synonyms
- Orchis punctulata var. galilaea Bornm. & M.Schulze; Orchis punctulata ssp. galilaea (Bornm. & M.Schulze) Soó

= Orchis galilaea =

Species of orchid

Orchis galilaea is a species of orchid found from southern Turkey to Palestine.

This species is pollinated by the bee Halictus marginatus.

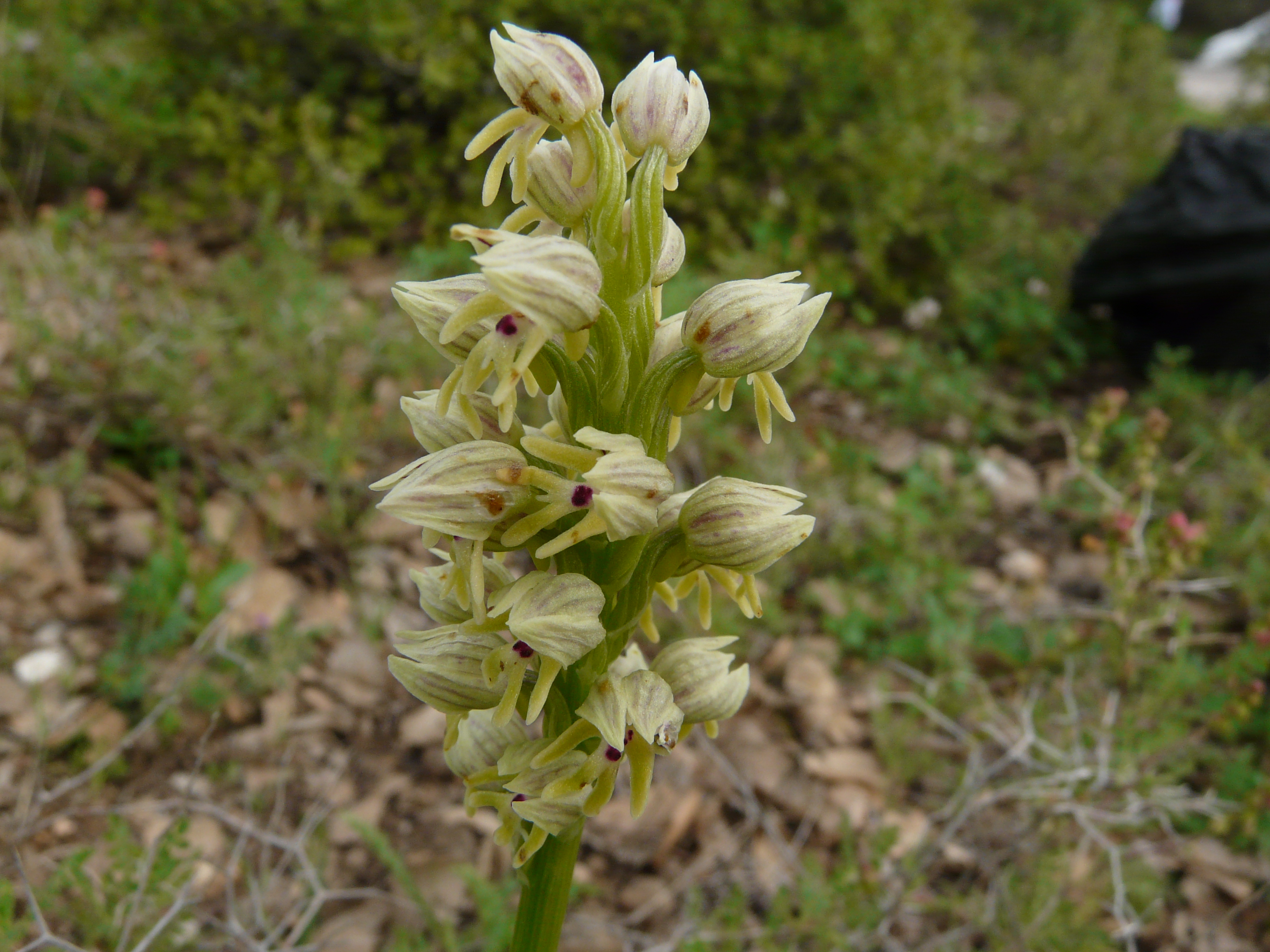
Yellow form
