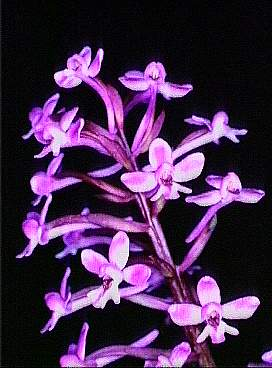
- Flower of Orchis brancifortii

Conservation status
- Least Concern (IUCN 3.1)

Scientific classification
- Kingdom: Plantae
- Clade: Tracheophytes
- Clade: Angiosperms
- Clade: Monocots
- Order: Asparagales
- Family: Orchidaceae
- Subfamily: Orchidoideae
- Genus: Orchis
- Species: O. brancifortii

Binomial name
- Orchis brancifortii Biv.

Synonyms
- Anacamptis brancifortii (Biv.) Lindl.; Orchis quadripunctata ssp. brancifortii (Biv.) E.G.Camus; Anacamptis quadripunctata Lindl.; Orchis brancifortii f. maculata J.Baláz & M.Baláz

= Orchis brancifortii =

Species of orchid

Orchis brancifortii is a species of orchid endemic to Sardinia, Sicily, and southern Italy.
