= Orchis adenocheila =

Scientific classification
- Kingdom: Plantae
- Clade: Tracheophytes
- Clade: Angiosperms
- Clade: Monocots
- Order: Asparagales
- Family: Orchidaceae
- Subfamily: Orchidoideae
- Genus: Orchis
- Species: O. adenocheila

Binomial name
- Orchis adenocheila Czerniak.

Synonyms
- Orchis militaris lusus adenocheila (Czerniak.) Hautz.; Orchis punctulata subsp. adenocheila (Czerniak.) Aver.

Species of flowering plant

Orchis adenocheila is an orchid. Its native range spans from southeast Transcaucasus to north Iran.
