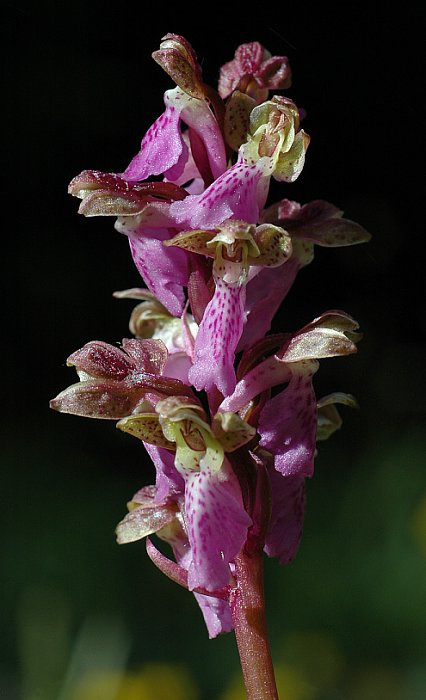
- Flower of Orchis spitzelii

Scientific classification
- Kingdom: Plantae
- Clade: Tracheophytes
- Clade: Angiosperms
- Clade: Monocots
- Order: Asparagales
- Family: Orchidaceae
- Subfamily: Orchidoideae
- Genus: Orchis
- Species: O. spitzelii

Binomial name
- Orchis spitzelii Saut. ex W.D.J.Koch (1837)

Subspecies
- Orchis spitzelii subsp. cazorlensis (Lacaita) D.Rivera & Lopez Velez; Orchis spitzelii subsp. nitidifolia (W.P.Teschner) Soó; Orchis spitzelii subsp. spitzelii

Synonyms
- Androrchis spitzelii (Saut. ex W.D.J.Koch) D.Tyteca & E.Klein (2008); Barlia spitzelii (Saut. ex W.D.J.Koch) Szlach. (2001); Orchis patens subsp. spitzelii (Saut. ex W.D.J.Koch) Á.Löve & Kjellq. (1973); Orchis patens var. spitzelii (Saut. ex W.D.J.Koch) Fiori & Paol. (1898)

= Orchis spitzelii =

Species of orchid

Orchis spitzelii is a species of orchid found from Sweden (Gotland), eastern Spain to the Caucasus and western Asia and northwestern Africa.

Specifically, it is native to northern Europe (Sweden), central Europe (Austria and possibly extirpated in Germany), southwestern Europe (the Balearic Islands, Corsica, France, and Spain), southeastern Europe (Albania, Bulgaria, Greece, Italy, Crete, and countries of the former Yugoslavia), northern Africa (Algeria and Morocco), western Asia (Iran, Lebanon, Syria, and Turkey), and both the North Caucasus and Transcaucasia.

== Subspecies ==
Three subspecies are accepted.

- Orchis spitzelii subsp. cazorlensis (Lacaita) D.Rivera & Lopez Velez – central and eastern Spain, Balearic Islands, and Morocco
- Orchis spitzelii subsp. nitidifolia (W.P.Teschner) Soó – Crete
- Orchis spitzelii subsp. spitzelii – Sweden (Gotland), Austria, Mediterranean Europe from Spain to Bulgaria, Algeria, Western Asia, and the Caucasus
