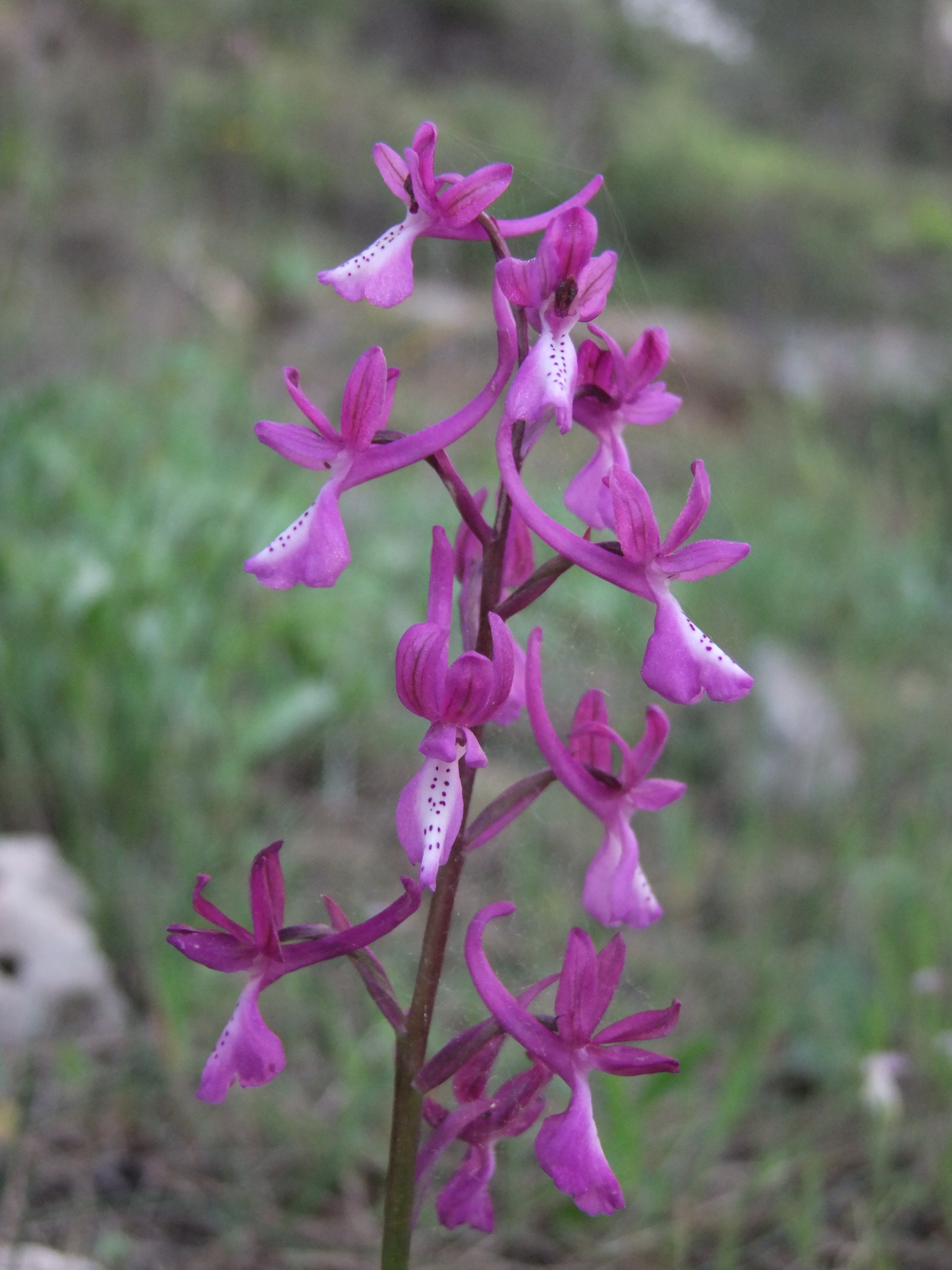
- Flower of Orchis anatolica

Scientific classification
- Kingdom: Plantae
- Clade: Embryophytes
- Clade: Tracheophytes
- Clade: Angiosperms
- Clade: Monocots
- Order: Asparagales
- Family: Orchidaceae
- Subfamily: Orchidoideae
- Genus: Orchis
- Species: O. anatolica

Binomial name
- Orchis anatolica Boiss.

Synonyms
- Orchis anatolica var. kochii Boiss.; O. anatolica f. rariflora (K.Koch) Soó; O. anatolica f. taurica Rchb.f.; O. anatolica subvar. taurica (Rchb.f.) E.G.Camus

= Orchis anatolica =

Species of flowering plant

Orchis anatolica is a species of flowering plant in the Orchidaceae family. It is native to Crete, Cyprus, the East Aegean Islands, Greece, Iran, Iraq, Lebanon, the Palestine region, Syria, and Turkey.
