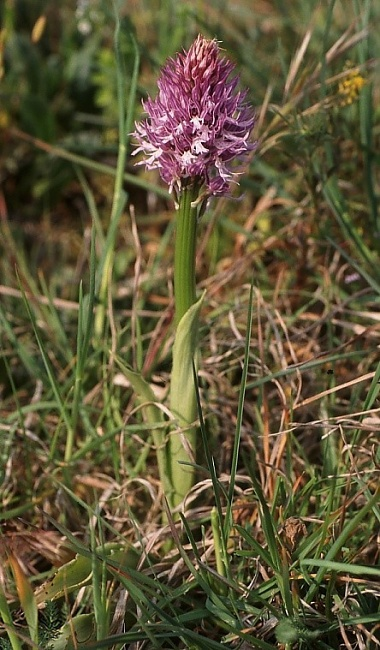
- Orchis italica in Tuscany

Scientific classification
- Kingdom: Plantae
- Clade: Tracheophytes
- Clade: Angiosperms
- Clade: Monocots
- Order: Asparagales
- Family: Orchidaceae
- Subfamily: Orchidoideae
- Genus: Orchis
- Species: O. italica

Binomial name
- Orchis italica Poir.

Synonyms
- List: Orchis longicornis Lam.; Orchis tephrosanthos Desf.; Orchis longicruris Link; Orchis undulatifolia Biv.; Orchis welwitschii Rchb.f.; Orchis longicruris subsp. longipenis Font Quer & P.Palau; Orchis italica var. fontinalis F.M.Vázquez; Orchis fusca var. stenoloba Coss. & Germ.; Orchis italica f. breviloba Halácsy; Orchis italica var. fontinalis F.M.Vázquez

= Orchis italica =

Species of orchid

Orchis italica, the naked man orchid or the Italian orchid, is a species of orchid native to the Mediterranean Basin. It gets its common name from the lobed lip (labellum) of each flower which resembles the general shape of a naked man wearing a hat. In Italy, it was believed that the consumption of the plant is conducive to virility. It prefers partial shade and low nutrient soil, and flowers in April. Orchis italica grows up to 50 centimetres (20 in) in height, with bright pink, densely clustered flowers.

== Distribution ==
Orchis italica is commonly found in large clusters in the Mediterranean region. It is native to southwestern Europe (Balearic Islands, Portugal, Sardinia, and Spain), southeastern Europe (Albania, Greece, Italy, Crete, Sicily, and countries of the former Yugoslavia), western Asia (Cyprus, the East Aegean Islands, Lebanon, Syria, Israel and Turkey), and northern Africa (Algeria, Libya, Morocco, and Tunisia).

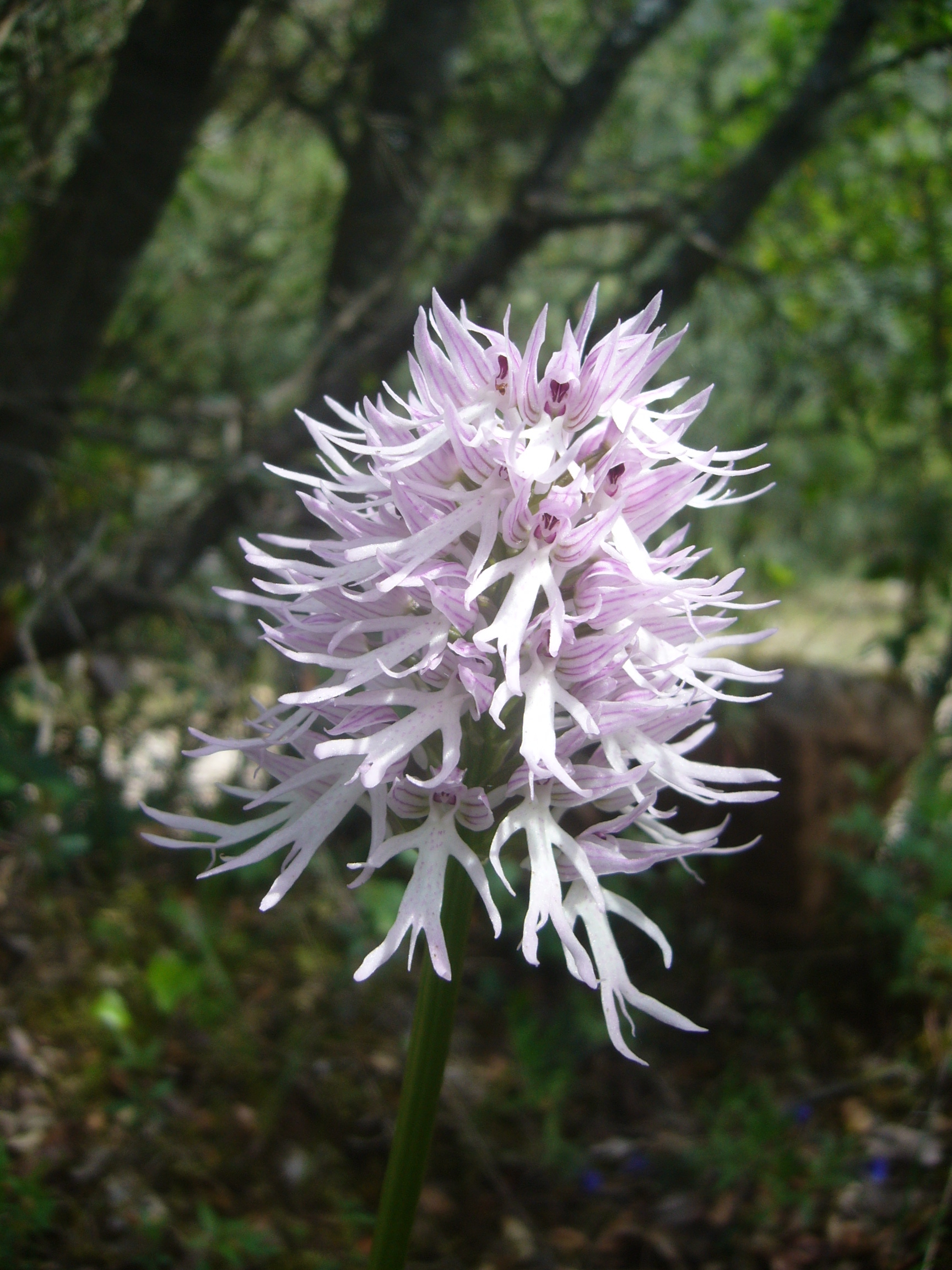
Orchis italica in the Natural Park of Serra de Enciña de Lastra, Ourense, Galicia, Spain
