= Agostino Todaro =

Italian botanist (1818–1892)

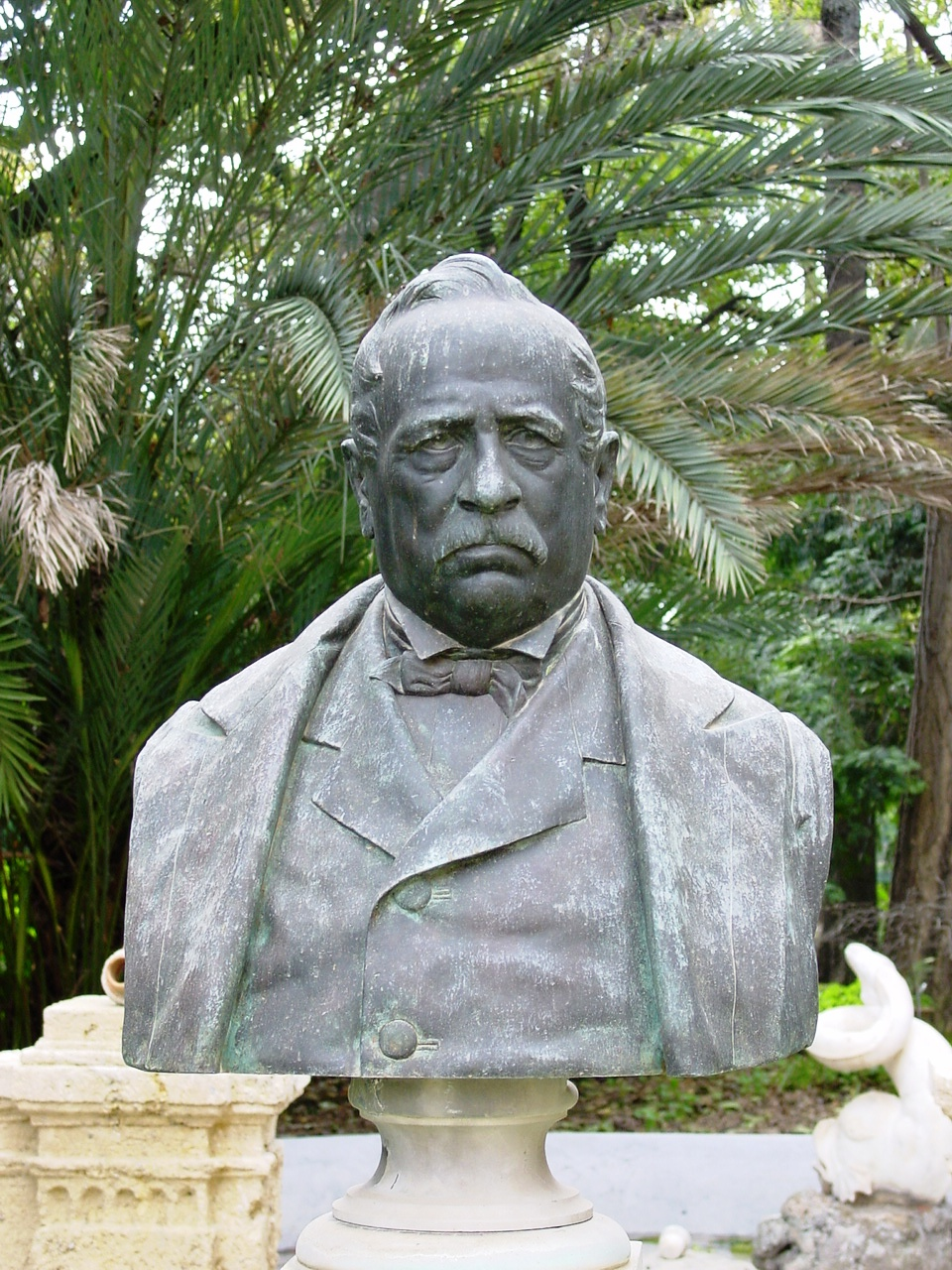
- Bust of Todaro in the Orto botanico di Palermo
- Born: 14 January 1818; Palermo, Kingdom of the Two Sicilies
- Died: 18 April 1892 (aged 74); Palermo, Italy
- Scientific career
- Fields: Botany
- Author abbrev. (botany): Tod.

Agostino Todaro (14 January 1818 – 18 April 1892) was an Italian botanist.

He was born and died in Palermo, Italy. He was a professor of botany and became the director of the botanical gardens in Palermo. Starting with 1864 he edited the exsiccata Flora Sicula exsiccata. Todaro published the Hortus Botanicus Panormitanus in 1876–1878.

In 1843, botanist Filippo Parlatore published Todaroa, which is a genus of flowering plants from the Canary Islands, belonging to the family Apiaceae. It just contains one known species, Todaroa aurea (Aiton) Parl., and it is named after Agostino Todaro.

The standard botanical author abbreviation Tod. is applied to species he described.

== Main works ==
- Orchideae siculae sive enumeratio orchidearum in Sicilia hucusque detectarum, Ex Empedoclea Officina, Panormi 1842 (in Italian)
- Rapporto della Commissione per l'imboschimento e censuazione di Monte Pellegrino, con G. Schiro, Lima, Palermo 1851. (in Italian)
- Nuovi generi e nuove specie di piante coltivate nel Real Orto Botanico di Palermo, Pagando e Piola, Palermo 1858 (in Italian)
- Relazione sui cotoni coltivati al r. Orto botanico nell'anno 1864, Lorsnaider, Palermo 1864. (in Italian)
- Synopsis plantarum acotyledonearum vascularium sponte provenientium in Sicilia insulisque adjacentibus, Lao, Palermo 1866. (in Italian)
- Relazione sui cotoni coltivati nel r. Orto botanico di Palermo nell'anno 1876, Lao, Palermo 1877. (in Italian)
- Relazione sulla cultura dei cotoni in Italia, seguita da una monografia del genere Gossypium, Stamp. Reale, Palermo 1878. (in Italian)
- Sopra una nuova specie di Fourcroya, Lao, Palermo 1879. (in Italian)
