= 2001 Men's European Volleyball Championship squads =

This article shows all participating team squads at the 2001 Men's European Volleyball Championship, held in Ostrava, Czech Republic from September 8 to September 16, 2001.

== Bulgaria ==
- Head Coach: —

#	Name	Date of Birth	Height	Weight	Spike	Block
—	Evgeni Ivanov	06.03.1974	201
—	Nikolay Vassilev Ivanov		192
—	Nikolay Jeliazkov		198
—	Plamen Konstantinov		202
—	Daniel Mihaylov		197
—	Nikolay Naydenov		200
—	Vladimir Nikolov		200
—	Daniel Peev		192
—	Ivaylo Stefanov		202
—	Krasimir Stefanov		202
—	Hristo Tsvetanov	29.03.1978	198	85	345	330
—	Yuli Vassilev		200

== Czech Republic ==
- Head Coach: —

#	Name	Date of Birth	Height	Weight	Spike	Block
—	Luděk Černoušek		188
—	Ivo Dubš		198
—	Miroslav Javůrek		204
—	Přemysl Kubala		200
—	Martin Lébl		201
—	Jiří Novák		197
—	Jakub Novotný		196
—	Marek Novotný		202
—	Petr Pesl		200
—	Dalibor Polák		198
—	Josef Smolka	30.05.1964
—	Petr Zapletal		194

== France ==
- Head Coach: Philippe Blain

#	Name	Date of Birth	Height	Weight	Spike	Block
1	Renaud Herpe	21.07.1975	197	97	350	325
2	Hubert Henno	06.10.1976	188	83	330	310
3	Dominique Daquin	10.11.1972	197	85	352	325
8	Laurent Capet	05.05.1972	202	92	350	325
9	Frantz Granvorka	10.03.1976	195	90	364	327
10	Vincent Montméat	01.09.1977	196	88	345	323
12	Luc Marquet	15.04.1970	192	84	345	320
14	Philippe Barça-Cysique	22.04.1977	194	88	347	325
—	Fabrice Bry		202
—	Laurent Chambertin		191
—	Olivier Lecat		188
—	Jean-Charles Monneraye		209

== Germany ==
- Head Coach: —

#	Name	Date of Birth	Height	Weight	Spike	Block
1	Marko Liefke	15.07.1974	206	105	360	336
5	Björn Andrae	14.05.1981	200	82	342	325
6	Ilja Wiederschein	05.04.1977	198	86	331	310
8	Michael Mayer	14.02.1980	193	87	340	315
11	Frank Dehne	14.02.1976	202	93	349	328
12	Christian Pampel	06.09.1979	198	89	358	331
13	Ralph Bergmann	26.05.1970	206	96	350	327
15	Mark Siebeck	14.10.1975	195	88	334	315
17	Norbert Walter	01.07.1979	210	101	351	334
18	Vincent Lange	15.06.1974	195	90	328	307
—	Frank Bachmann		191
—	Bogdan Jalowietzki	13.12.1967	202	91

== Hungary ==
- Head Coach: —

#	Name	Date of Birth	Height	Weight	Spike	Block
—	Zoltan David		191
11	Balázs Gelencsér		204
—	Sándor Kántor	01.02.1971	198
4	Róbert Koch		188
—	Peter Mészáros		199
15	Dömötör Mészáros	27.10.1976	199
—	Gábor Szabó		192
—	Tamas Szekeres		198
—	Tibor Tomanóczy		204
—	Roland Tullner		197
—	Csaba Urfi		196
—	Péter Veres		200

== Italy ==
- Head Coach: —

#	Name	Date of Birth	Height	Weight	Spike	Block
—	Lorenzo Bernardi	11.08.1968	199
—	Vigor Bovolenta	30.05.1974	202
—	Marco Meoni	25.05.1973	197
5	Valerio Vermiglio	01.03.1976	189	83	342	320
6	Samuele Papi	20.05.1973	191	84	345	308
7	Andrea Sartoretti	19.06.1971	194	88	353	319
9	Cristian Casoli	27.01.1975	194	85	345	315
11	Hristo Zlatanov	21.04.1976	204	103	355	315
12	Mirko Corsano	28.10.1973	191	87	342	303
14	Alessandro Fei	29.11.1978	204	90	352	321
16	Luca Tencati	16.03.1979	200	97	350	330
17	Leondino Giombini	30.01.1975	204	107	355	323

== Netherlands ==
- Head Coach: Bert Goedkoop

#	Name	Date of Birth	Height	Weight	Spike	Block
1	Dirk-Jan van Gendt	18.07.1974	185	78	332	313
2	Nico Freriks	22.12.1981	191	85	327	306
3	Sander Olsthoorn	21.07.1974	207	89	344	322
4	Reinder Nummerdor	10.09.1976	194	87	342	321
5	Guido Görtzen	09.11.1970	198	98	349	340
6	Richard Schuil	02.05.1973	202	92	347	329
7	Mike van de Goor	14.05.1973	206	96	350	322
8	Jeroen Trommel	01.08.1980	194	89	340	310
10	Joost Kooistra	31.10.1976	195	100	345	327
12	Jochem de Gruijter	18.04.1978	199	92	338	328
13	Joppe Paulides	13.04.1982	204	85	340	327
16	Allan van de Loo	10.01.1975	196	90	342	321

== Poland ==
The following is the Polish roster in the 2001 Men's European Volleyball Championship.

Head coach:	Ryszard Bosek
Assistant:	Wojciech Drzyzga

No.	Name	Date of birth	2001 club
1	Andrzej Stelmach	15 August 1972	(Italy) Yahoo! Italia Ferrara
3	Piotr Gruszka	8 March 1977	(Italy) Cagliari Volley
4	Marcin Nowak	17 October 1975	(Italy) Sempre Volley
5	Paweł Zagumny	18 October 1977	(Italy) Sempre Volley
6	Dawid Murek	24 July 1977	(Poland) Galaxia AZS Bank Częstochowa
7	Krzysztof Wójcik	20 October 1960	(Poland) Jastrzębie Borynia
8	Przemysław Michalczyk	22 August 1973	(Poland) Jastrzębie Borynia
12	Jarosław Stancelewski	11 May 1974	(Poland) Nordea WKS Czarni Radom
13	Sebastian Świderski	26 June 1977	(Poland) Mostostal Azoty Kędzierzyn-Koźle
14	Paweł Papke	13 February 1977	(Poland) Mostostal Azoty Kędzierzyn-Koźle
16	Rafał Musielak	22 August 1973	(Poland) Mostostal Azoty Kędzierzyn-Koźle
18	Robert Szczerbaniuk	29 May 1977	(Poland) Mostostal Azoty Kędzierzyn-Koźle

== Russia ==
- Head Coach: —

#	Name	Date of Birth	Height	Weight	Spike	Block
2	Vadim Khamuttskikh	26.11.1969	196	85	342	331
4	Ruslan Olikhver	11.04.1969	201	97	353	340
5	Pavel Abramov	23.04.1979	198	89	347	336
6	Igor Shulepov	16.11.1972	203	94	351	340
8	Evgeni Mitkov	23.03.1972	194	89	352	341
9	Sergey Tetyukhin	23.09.1975	197	89	349	338
10	Roman Yakovlev	13.08.1976	201	92	352	341
14	Aleksandr Kosarev	30.09.1977	202	92	352	343
15	Aleksandr Gerasimov	22.01.1975	201	92	352	341
18	Aleksey Kuleshov	24.02.1979	206	92	353	340
—	Roman Arkhipov		191
—	Aleksey Kazakov	18.03.1976	217	102	355	342

== Slovakia ==
- Head Coach: —

#	Name	Date of Birth	Height	Weight	Spike	Block
—	Pavel Bartik		204
—	Gabriel Chocholak		202
—	Pavel Chudik		190
—	Martin Jankovic		198
—	Marek Kardos		187
—	Tomas Kmet		202
—	Andrej Kravárik	28.07.1971	206
—	Dusan Kubica		186
—	Richard Nemec		202
—	Branco Pistovic		191
—	Vladimir Procházka		193
—	Marian Vavrek		206

== Slovenia ==
- Head Coach: —

#	Name	Date of Birth	Height	Weight	Spike	Block
—	Davor Čebron		197
—	Dejan Fujs		192
—	Bogdan Kotnik		195
—	Samo Miklavc		193
—	Dragan Pezelj		195
—	Matija Pleško	03.03.1976	185
—	Mišo Pušnik
—	Dragan Rafovic		205
—	Rok Satler	04.04.1979	191
—	Sebastjan Škorc		180
—	David Slatinšek		197
—	Tomislav Šmuc		188

== Yugoslavia ==
- Head Coach: Zoran Gajić

#	Name	Date of Birth	Height	Weight	Spike	Block
6	Slobodan Boškan	18.08.1975	199	87	343	320
12	Andrija Gerić	24.01.1977	203	101	350	323
9	Nikola Grbić	06.09.1973	194	91	346	320
10	Vladimir Grbić	14.12.1970	193	87	360	350
1	Rajko Jokanović	27.11.1971	191	80	335	315
2	Goran Marić	02.11.1981	204	87	344	327
7	Đula Mešter	03.04.1972	203	90	346	325
8	Vasa Mijić	11.04.1973	186	80	332	307
14	Ivan Miljković	13.09.1979	206	88	354	333
5	Edin Škorić	01.12.1975	195
13	Goran Vujević	27.02.1973	192	94	339	315
18	Igor Vušurović	24.09.1974	200	86	342	323
