= Ilia (name) =

Ilia is a given name and variant of Ilya.

Ilia is the name of:

== People ==
- Ilia II of Georgia (born 1933), current Catholicos-Patriarch of Georgia
- Ilia Abuladze (1901–1968), Georgian historian, philologist and public figure
- Ilia Averbukh (born 1973), Russian ice dancer
- Ilia Beshkov (1901–1958), Bulgarian artist, writer, and pedagogue
- Ilia Braunstein (1908–1980), Belgian philatelist
- Ilia Calderón (born 1972), Colombian journalist
- Ilia Chavchavadze (1837–1907), Georgian writer, political figure, poet, and publisher
- Ilia Chernousov (born 1986), Russian cross country skier
- Ilia Datunashvili (1937–2022), Soviet Georgian football player
- Ilia Fibiger (1817–1867), Danish writer and playwright
- Ilia Frolov (born 1984), modern pentathlete from Russia
- Ilia Giorgadze (born 1978), Georgian artistic gymnast
- Ilia Ignatev (born 1992), Kyrgyz sailor
- Ilia Iljiushenok (born 1993), Russian chess International Master
- Ilia Isaev (born 1980), Russian former competitive ice dancer
- Ilia Kaikatsishvili (born 1993), Georgian rugby union player
- Ilia Kandelaki (born 1981), Georgian retired footballer
- Ilia Klimkin (born 1980), Russian former competitive figure skater
- Ilia Koshevoy (born 1991), Belarusian professional cyclist
- Ilia Kulik (born 1977), Russian figure skater
- Ilia Lekach, chief executive officer of Adrenalina
- Ilia Londaridze (born 1989), Georgian professional basketball player
- Ilia Maissuradze (born 1977), Georgian rugby union player
- Ilia Malinin (born 2004), American figure skater, 2024, 2025, 2026 World champion, the only person able to land a quad axel
- Ilia Morozov (born 2008), Russian ice hockey player
- Ilia Odishelidze (1865–1924), Georgian military leader
- Ilia Popov (born 1982), Russian sledge hockey player
- Ilia Shtokalov (born 1986), Russian sprint canoeist
- Ilia Shuke, former footballer and coach
- Ilia Skirda (born 2002), Russian figure skater
- Ilia Spiridonov (born 1998), Russian pair skater
- Ilia Szrajbman (1907–1943), Polish Olympic freestyle swimmer
- Ilia Tkachenko (born 1986), Russian ice dancer
- Ilia Topuria (born 1997), Georgian mixed martial artist
- Ilia Trilling (1895–1947), German-born Yiddish theatrical producer and composer
- Ilia Vekua (1907–1977), Georgian mathematician
- Ilia Vlasov (born 1995), Russian volleyball player
- Ilia Volkov (born 1985), Russian sledge hockey player
- Ilia Volok (born 1965), Soviet-born character actor
- Ilia Xhokaxhi (1948–2007), Albanian painter, scenographer, and costume designer
- Ilia Zdanevich (1894–1975), Georgian and French writer and artist
- Ilia Zedginidze (born 1977), Georgian former rugby union player
- Ilia Zhilin (born 1985), Russian male volleyball player
- Ilia or "Julia", first wife of Roman dictator Sulla
- Iliya Dyakov (born 1963), Bulgarian former footballer
- Iliya Kushev (born 1980), Bulgarian tennis player
- Iliya Pavlov (1960–2003), Bulgarian businessman
- Iliya Velichkov (born 1956), retired Bulgarian footballer

== Characters ==
- Rhea Silvia, also known as Ilia, the mother of Romulus and Remus in Roman mythology
- Ilia (Mozart), a character in Mozart's Idomeneo
- Ilia (Star Trek), a character in Star Trek: The Motion Picture
- Ilia (The Legend of Zelda), a character in The Legend of Zelda: Twilight Princess
- Ilia Amitola, a recurring character in the animated web series RWBY

== See also ==
- Elia (disambiguation)
- Ilia (disambiguation)
- Ilija, given name
- Ilja, given name
- Iliya (name)
