= Ilya (disambiguation) =

Ilya is a given name.

Ilya or ILYA may also refer to:

- 2968 Iliya, an asteroid
- Ilya, Belarus, a village
- Ilya (band), from Bristol, England
- ILYA, British comics artist
- "Ilya", a song by Martina Topley-Bird from her 2003 album Quixotic

== See also ==
- Elia (disambiguation)
- Ilia (disambiguation)
- Ilija (disambiguation)
- Ilja
- Ilyin
- Ilyinka
- Ilyino
- Ilyinsky (disambiguation)
