= Elias =

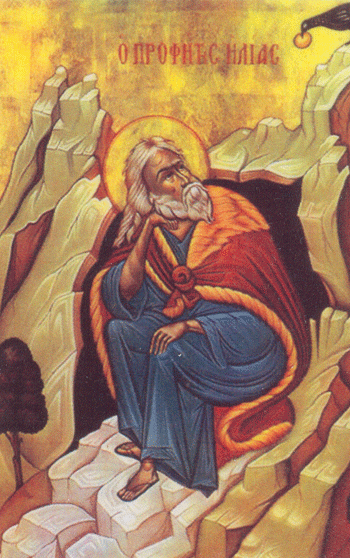
Elias on Mount Horeb, as depicted in a Greek Orthodox icon.

Elias (/ɪˈlaɪəs/ il-EYE-əs; Ancient Greek: Ἠλίας, romanized: Elías) is the hellenized version for the name of Elijah (Hebrew: אֵלִיָּהוּ, romanized: ʾĒlīyyāhū; Syriac: ܐܠܝܐ, romanized: Elyāe; Arabic: إلیاس, romanized: Ilyās, or إلیا, Ilyā), a prophet in the Northern Kingdom of Israel in the 9th century BC, mentioned in several holy books. Due to Elias' role in the scriptures and to many later associated traditions, the name is used as a personal name in numerous languages.

== Variants ==
- Éilias Irish
- Elia Italian, English
- Elias Norwegian
- Elías Icelandic
- Éliás Hungarian
- Elías Spanish
- Eliáš, Elijáš Czech
- Elijah, Elia, Ilyas, Elias Indonesian
- Elias, Eelis, Eljas Finnish
- Elias Danish, German, Swedish
- Elias Portuguese
- Elias, Iliya (ایلیا ,الیاس) Persian
- Elias, Elis Swedish
- Elias, Elyas (ኤሊያስ) Ethiopian
- Elias, Elyas Philippines
- Eliasz Polish
- Élie French
- Elija Slovene
- Elijah English, Hebrew
- Elis Welsh
- Elisedd Welsh
- Eliya (එලියා) Sinhala
- Eliyas (Ілияс) Kazakh
- Eliyahu, Eliya (אֵלִיָּהוּ, אליה) Biblical Hebrew, Hebrew
- Elyās, Ilyās, Eliya (إیلیا, إلیاس) Arabic
- Elliot, Elliott English
- Ellis English, Welsh (anglicised)
- Helias Ecclesiastical Latin
- Ilia (Илия) Bulgarian, Church Slavonic, Macedonian, Russian
- Ilia (ილია) Georgian
- Ilias (Ηλίας) Koine Greek, Modern Greek
- Ilie Romanian
- Ilija (Илија) Croatian, Macedonian, Serbian
- Ilijas/Ilijaz Bosnian
- Ilja German
- Iljo (Иљо) Macedonian
- Iliya (Илия) Bulgarian
- Illés Hungarian
- Illia (Ілля) Ukrainian
- Ilya (Илья) Russian
- İlyas Turkish
- Ilyaas Somali
- Ilyos Uzbek
- Ilias/Ilyas/Elias/Elyas/Alias/Alyas Malay
- Líggjas Faroese
- Lyes Kabyle
- Yeghia (Եղիա) Armenian
- 埃利亚斯 (āi lì yǎ sī) Chinese

=== Feminized variants ===
- Iliana (Илиана) Bulgarian
- Ilina (Илина) Bulgarian, Macedonian
- Ilinca Romanian
- Ilinka (Илинка) Croatian, Macedonian, Serbian
- Eliana, Iliana Greek
- Éliane French

== People with the given name ==
- Elias (Greek scholar), 6th century commentator on Aristotle and Porphyry
- Elias I, Armenian religious leader, Catholicos of All Armenians from 703 to 717
- Elias of Nisibis (975–1046), Church of the East bishop of Nisibis and an important mediaeval chronicler, also known as Elijah of Nisibis and Eliya bar Shinaya
- Elias, Duke of Parma (1880–1959), head of the House of Bourbon-Parma and pretender to the defunct throne of Parma
- Elias Aguirre (born 1984), Swedish politician
- Elías Ahúja y Andría (1863–1951), Spanish politician
- Elias Alves da Silva (born 1981), Brazilian football player
- Elias Ammerbach (1530–1597), German organist
- Elias Ashmole (1617–1692), English antiquary and politician
- Elias Atallah (born 1947), Lebanese politician
- Elias Atmatsidis (born 1969), Greek football player
- Elías Báez (born 2004), Argentine footballer
- Elias Bonine (1843–1916), American photographer
- Elias Boudinot (1740–1821), American politician
- Elias Boudinot (Cherokee) (1802–1839), Native American writer
- Elias Breeskin (1896–1969), Russian violinist
- Elias Canetti (1905–1994), Bulgarian writer
- Elias Chandler (1856–1909), American colonel and major
- Elias Charalambous (born 1980), Cypriot footballer
- Elias James Corey (born 1928), American chemist
- Elias Dayton (1737–1807), American soldier and politician
- Elias P. Demetracopoulos, Greek journalist
- Elias Disney (1859–1941), Canadian businessman, father of Walt Disney
- Elias Dolah (born 1993), Thai footballer
- Elias (footballer, born 1963), Portuguese footballer, full name Fernando Elias Oliveira da Silva
- Elias Farkouh (1948–2020), Jordanian writer
- Elias Freij (1918–1998), Palestinian mayor
- Elias John Wilkinson Gibb (1857–1901), Scottish orientalist
- Elias Gleizer (1934–2015), Brazilian actor and comedian
- Elias Gottlob Haussmann (1695–1774), German painter
- Elias Harris (born 1989), German basketball player
- Elias Hicks (1748–1830), American Quaker Preacher
- Elias Holl (1573–1646), German architect
- Elias Howe (1819–1867), American inventor of the sewing machine
- Elias Hrawi (1925–2006), Lebanese politician
- Elias Irizarry (born 2001 or 2002), American political appointee
- Elias Kane (1794–1835), American politician
- Elias Khoury (1948–2024), Lebanese writer
- Elias Koteas (born 1961), Greek-Canadian actor
- Elias Lianos, Greek businessman
- Elias Lindholm (born 1994), Swedish ice hockey player
- Elias Lönnrot (1802–1884), Finnish philologist
- Elias Loomis (1811–1889), American mathematician
- Elias Maluvunu (born 2004), Swiss footballer
- Elias Mendes Trindade (born 1985), Brazilian former footballer
- Elias Motsoaledi (1924–1994), South African anti-apartheid activist
- Elias Murr (born 1962), Lebanese politician
- Elias Not Afraid (born 1990), Apsáalooke artist
- Elias Ngeny (born 1996), Kenyan middle-distance runner
- Elias Pavlidis (born 1978), Greek boxer
- Elias Petropoulos (1928–2003), Greek musicologist and writer
- Elias Pettersson (born 1998), Swedish ice hockey player
- Elias Polk (1806–1886), American slave and political activist
- Elias Porter (1914–1987), American psychologist
- Elias Rababi (1913–1999), Lebanese journalist and politician
- Elias Ricks, American football player
- Elias Bender Rønnenfelt (born 1992), Danish singer
- Elias Alford Rowan (1837–1912), American politician
- Elias Salomonsson (born 2004), Swedish hockey player
- Elias Sarkis (1924–1985), Lebanese lawyer and President of Lebanon from 1976 to 1982
- Elias "Vic" Seixas, known as Vic Seixas (1923–2024), American Hall of Fame former top-10 tennis player
- Elias Seppänen (born 2003), Finnish racing driver
- Elias Shoufani (1932–2013), Palestinian author and historian
- Elias Soares de Oliveira, Elias (footballer, born 1931), Brazilian former football striker
- Elias Spantidakis, known as Louis Tikas (1886–1914), Greek-American union leader
- Elias M. Stein (1931–2018), American mathematician
- Elias Syrjä (born 1998), Finnish freestyle skier
- Elias Tahan (born 1986), American photographer
- Elias Toufexis (born 1975), Greek-Canadian actor
- Elias Vattis (born 1986), Cypriot football player
- Elias Venezis (1904–1973), Greek writer
- Elias Viljanen (born 1975), Finnish musician
- Elias Wessén (1889–1981), Swedish linguist
- Elias Wright (1830–1901), American Union brevet brigadier general during the Civil War era
- Elias Zerhouni (born 1951), Algerian-born American doctor
- Elias Zoghby (1912–2008), Lebanese archbishop
- Saint Ailill the First (460 – 526), Irish archbishop

== Fictional characters with the given name ==
- Elias, a prominent gangster in the TV series Person of Interest
- Elias Bogan, fictional character in the Marvel Comics universe
- Elias Grover, fictional character in the 2006 film Clerks II
- Elijah "Eli" Goldsworthy, fictional character from Degrassi: The Next Generation
- Elias Vikstedt fictional character from Salatut elämät

== People with the surname ==
- Elias (surname)

== See also ==
- Elia (disambiguation)
- Elijah (disambiguation)
- Elphas
- Ilias (name)
- Saint Elias (disambiguation)
