= Ilia =

Ilia may refer to:

== Science and medicine ==
- Apatura ilia or lesser purple emperor, a butterfly
- Ilium (bone) (plural: "ilia"), pelvic bone

== People ==
- Ilia (name), numerous
  - Ilia II, the former Catholicos-Patriarch of All Georgia

== Places ==
- Ilia, Hunedoara, Romania
- Elis (regional unit), Greece
- Elis Province, Greece

== Arts and literature ==
- Ilia, a character in Idomeneo, an opera by Mozart
- Ilia (The Legend of Zelda), a character in the video game The Legend of Zelda: Twilight Princess
- Ilia (Star Trek), a character in Star Trek: The Motion Picture
- Ilia, a nation of the continent Elibe from the Fire Emblem series
- Ilia the Righteous, a prominent figure of new Georgian literature
- Rhea Silvia or Ilia, the mother of Romulus and Remus in Roman mythology

== Other ==
- Illinois Institute of Art – Chicago, a nonprofit institution
- Ilia (band), a rock band
- Arturo Umberto Illia (1900–1983), former president of Argentina

== See also ==
- Elia (disambiguation)
- Ilija (disambiguation)
- Ilja
- Ilya (disambiguation)
