= Marcelino Ulibarri Eguilaz =

Spanish politician (1880–1951)

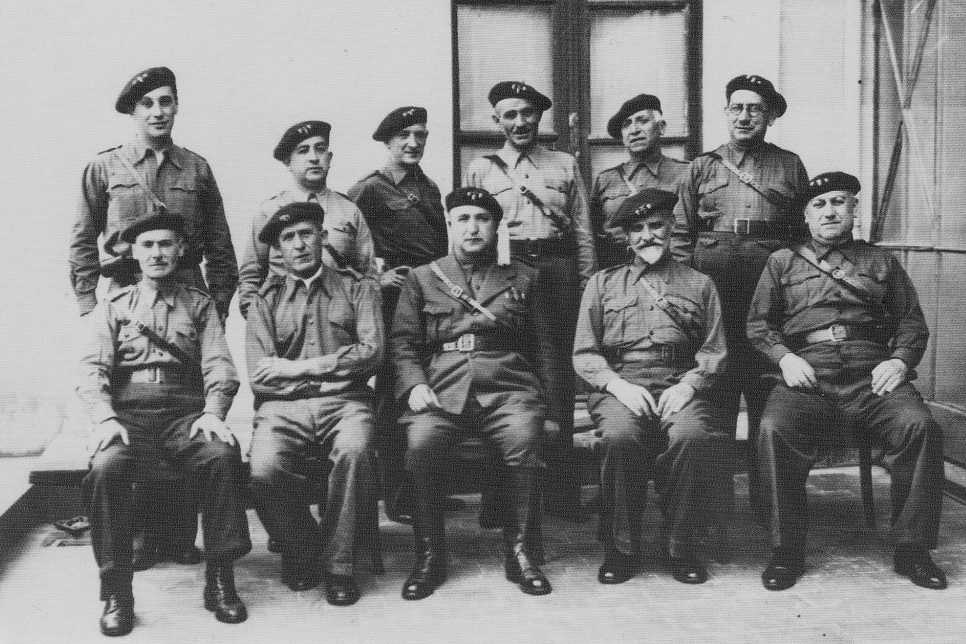
- Born: Marcelino Ulibarri Eguilaz; 1880; Muez, Spain
- Died: 1951 (aged 70–71); Tafalla, Spain
- Occupation: Corporate manager
- Known for: Civil servant, politician
- Political party: Carlism, FET

Marcelino de Ulibarri y Eguilaz (1880–1951) was a Spanish politician and civil servant. He is best known as head of repressive institutions of early Francoism: Delegación Nacional de Asuntos Especiales (1937–1938), Delegación del Estado para Recuperación de Documentos (1938–1944) and Tribunal Especial para la Represión de la Masonería y el Comunismo (1940–1941). Politically he was a longtime supporter of the Carlist cause. He briefly presided over the regional Aragón party branch (1933) and was member of the Navarrese regional executive (1936–1937), but during the Civil War he assumed a Francoist stand. During 4 terms he was member of the Falange Española Tradicionalista executive, Consejo Nacional (1939–1951), and during three terms he served in the Francoist Cortes (1943–1951).

== Family and youth ==
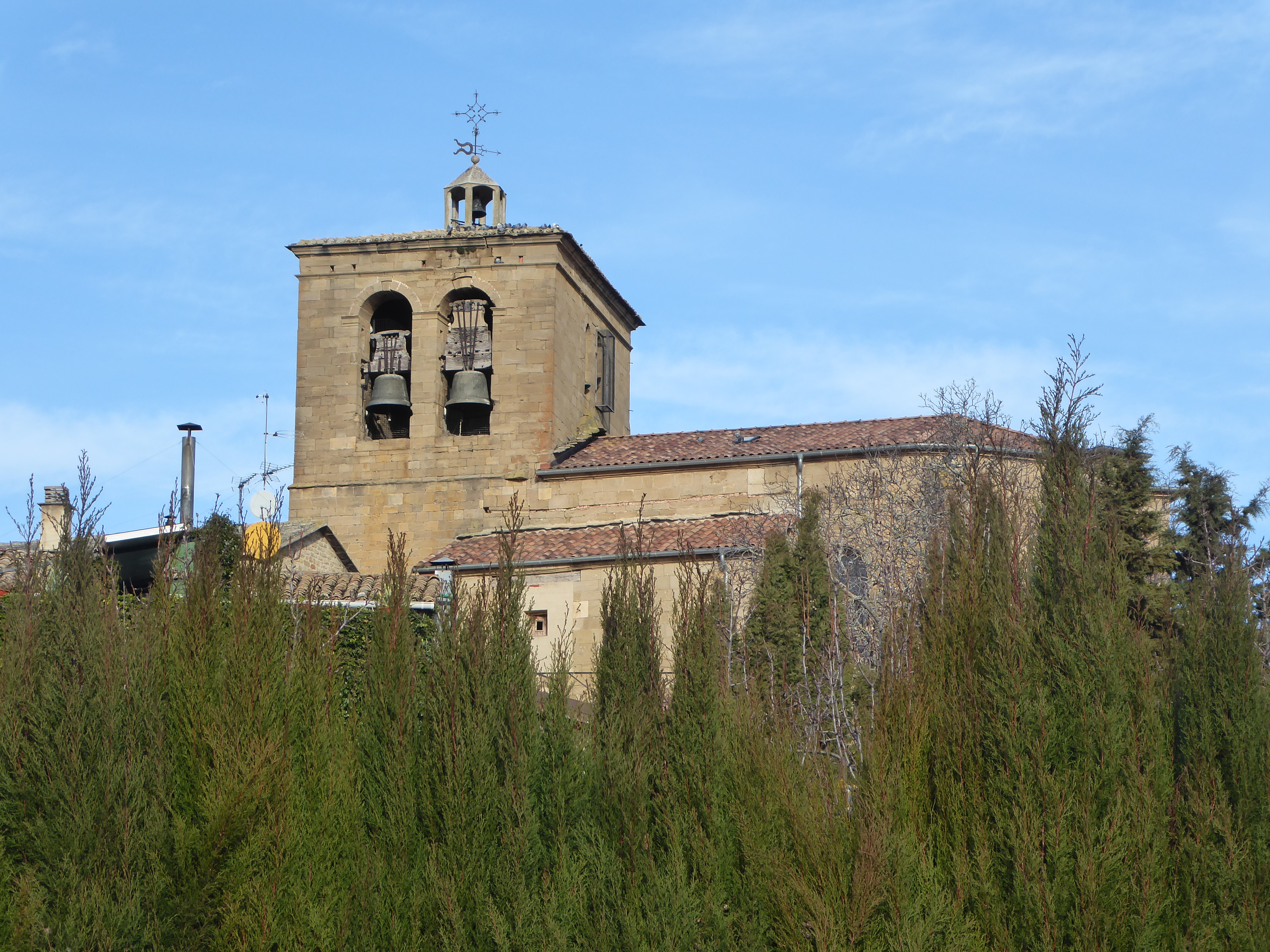
Muez, parish church

The Basque family of Ulibarri (spelled also Ullibarri, Ulíbarri or Uribarri) was first recorded in the Medieval era; over the centuries it became very branched, also in America, and produced a number of recognized personalities. Marcelino's forefathers formed part of the Navarrese hidalguia; his most distant ancestor identified was the great-grandfather Domingo, recorded in the late 18th century. His son and Marcelino's grandfather, Juan Ciriaco de Ulibarri Mélida (died 1883), was noted as "rico propietario" in Muez, a hamlet in the central Navarrese zone known as Tierra Estella. His son and the father of Marcelino, Ignacio de Ulibarri Hita (died after 1916), served as the mayor of Muez in the mid-1880s. In sources he was also named "rico propietario de Muez" and mentioned in relation to a multi-faceted agricultural business, though in 1915 the press referred to him also as "comerciante". The Ulibarri house in Muez, named "la casa de la Parra", was considered to have been "la principal del pueblo".

At unspecified time, though probably in the 1870s, Ulibarri Hita married Hilaria Eguiláz Pérez (died after 1909), a girl from the nearby village of Guirguillano. The couple had at least 7 children, almost all boys, with Marcelino born as the third oldest son. It is not clear what language was spoken at home, as at the time Muez was at the borders of the Basque-speaking zone, yet it is known that all siblings were raised in very pious way. None of the sources consulted provides information on education of the young Marcelino, though some later episodes suggest he frequented a Piarist college, most likely in Pamplona. It is neither clear whether and if yes when and where he pursued an academic career, especially given very complex specialized, administrative, and bureaucratic tasks he would perform in the future; some press notes from his early 20s mention him in relation to Zaragoza and some suggest a juridical background.

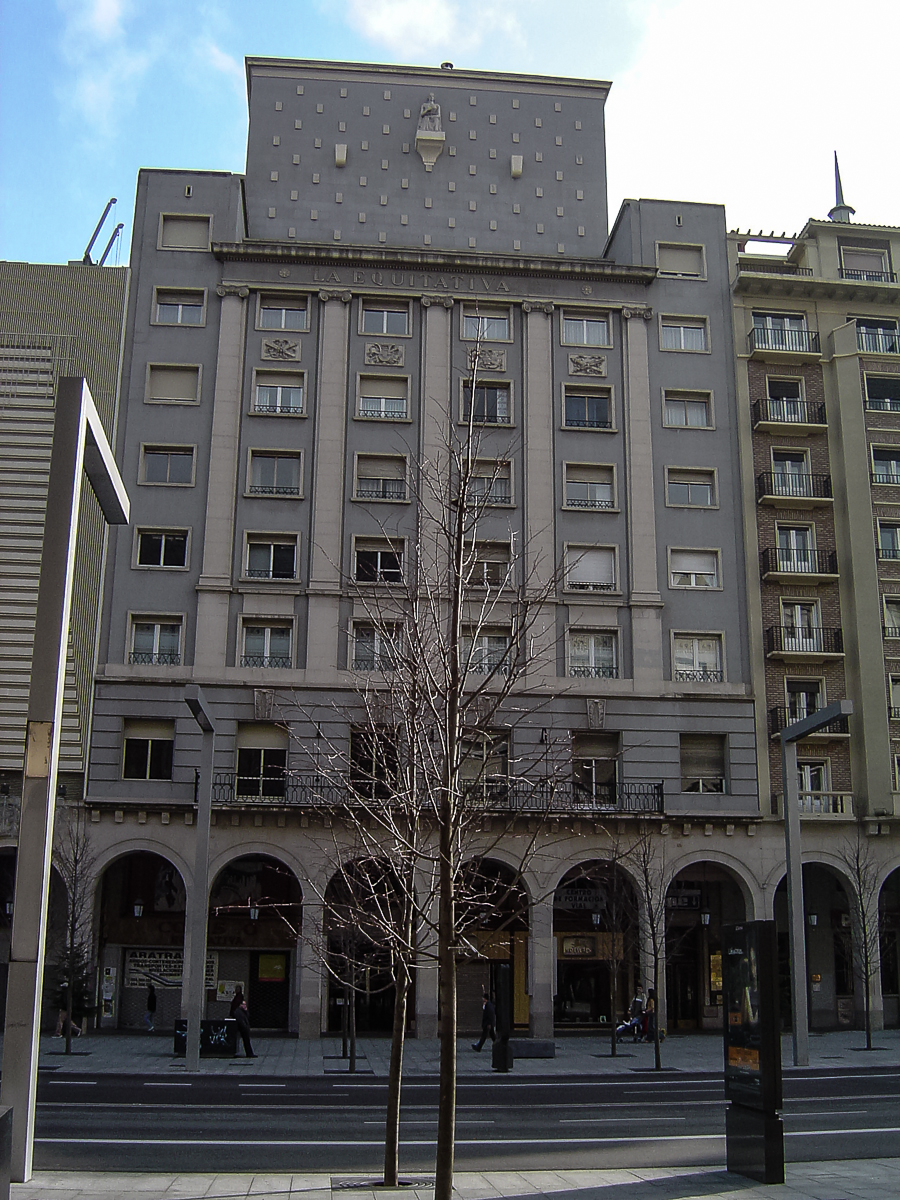
Equitativa site, Zaragoza

In historiography Ulibarri is referred to as a somewhat mysterious individual with merely few details from his biography known; this refers also to beginnings of his professional career, which remain entirely unclear except that they were related to Zaragoza. It is known he was somehow associated with agriculture, though as an official or a finance clerk rather than as a landholder. At some stage, yet no later than in the early 1920s, he joined La Equitativa, a Spanish subsidiary of the US insurance company, and worked in its Zaragoza branch, growing to mid-range management positions in the mid-1920s. In 1908 Ulibarri married Petra Castiella Pérez (died 1964), a girl from Tafalla; she was daughter to Domingo Castiella Cuadrado from a locally distinguished family of the Navarrese Ribera. The couple settled in Zaragoza, though at later stages they lived in Tafalla, Salamanca and again in Tafalla; they had no children. Ulibarri's best known relative are his nephews, the archivist Pedro Ruiz de Ulibarri and the artillery general Ignacio Ulibarri Lacarra.

== Early political engagements ==
Carlist standard

The Ulibarris are described as "una familia ya acendradamente carlista en la primera guerra", i.e. Carlist since the First Carlist War in the 1830s. In the 1860s they subscribed to various Traditionalist initiatives. During the Third Carlist War in the 1870s the family house in Muez hosted the claimant Carlos VII and his wife, who spent few nights there in wake of the Abárzuza battle; Marcelino's mother would later for decades keep recollecting this episode. First information on Marcelino's engagements are related to his early 20s; in 1904 he presided over a Carlist committee organizing a local Traditionalist event in Zaragoza, and in 1905 he was within a group which set up Juventud Carlista in the Aragonese capital. By the end of the decade Ulibarri was already in touch with major local personalities of the party. In 1907 he took part in electoral campaign of the Navarrese heavyweight Conde Rodezno, who competed for the Cortes ticket from Aoiz.

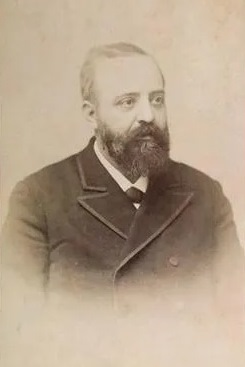
Pascual Comin, Carlist leader in Aragon

In the 1910s Ulibarri emerged among publicly recognizable politicians of the Aragonese branch of Carlism. In 1910 he represented jefé regional, Pascual Comín, in the local Junta de Censo, apparently when protesting alleged electoral irregularities; the same year he was among organizers and major speakers during rallies against secular schools, called by right-wing Catholic groupings. He started to appear also beyond Aragón, e.g. during a 1911 banquet in Madrid, intended to honor Carlist and Integrist deputies to the Cortes. Though in his early 30s, at the time he was still related to Juventud Carlista, e.g. in 1912 he featured in its Comision Organizadora during preparations to a local rally. In the early 1910s his formal role was this of secretario of Junta Regional, still presided by Comín.

In the mid-1910s Carlism was increasingly plagued by a conflict between the key Traditionalist theorist, Juan Vázquez de Mella, and the claimant Don Jaime. Ulibarri is not listed among the protagonists. When in 1919 the controversy escalated to full-scale showdown and produced secession of the Mellistas, Ulibarri remained loyal to his king. However, he assumed somewhat challenging stance when in 1920 he co-signed an open letter to Don Jaime. In polite yet bold terms the signatories demanded destitution of the key party Francophone Francisco Melgar, appointment of new editor of the Carlist mouthpiece El Correo Español, and setting up a collegial nationwide party executive. By the end of the decade Ulibarri's position in Zaragoza was already firm, also beyond politics. In the press he was noted as "inspector" and acknowledged on societè columns. In 1918 he took part in a meeting organized by Diputación Provincial, inspired by Junta de la Defensa del Agricultor and intended to tackle agricultural problems; it is not clear what institution he represented.

== Dictatorship and republic ==
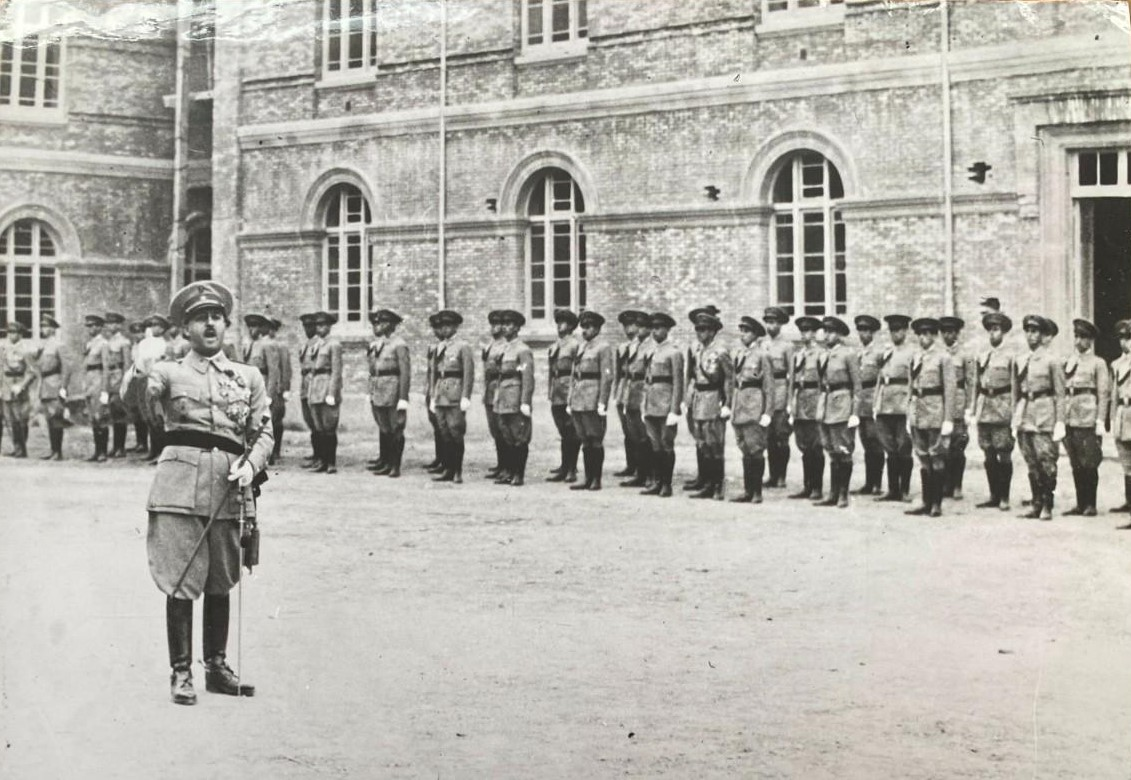
Franco in Academia General

In the 1920s Ulibarri was barely noted as engaged in political or meta-political activities, especially that in 1923 dictatorship of Primo de Rivera effectively suspended activity of political parties. During the decade Ulibarri was recorded mostly as taking part in various Catholic initiatives, e.g. in 1923 he co-organized a local Zaragoza campaign against blasphemy, and in 1929 he was active in the male Christian brotherhood of Caballeros del Pilar; both his family and scholars claimed later that he has always been very religious. His activity in Federación Católico-Social Navarra was more about economy than religion, as in wake of the overproduction crisis he represented the Navarrese agricultural syndicate in a joint inter-provincial "Comité de defensa de los intereses trigueros". Numerous authors claim that in the late 1920s Ulibarri befriended Francisco Franco, a young general who in 1928 became head of the newly established Academia General Militar in Zaragoza. There is never a source provided to support these claims and it is not clear in what circumstances a nationwide known general might have interfaced with a local Carlist.

According to some sources already in 1931 Ulibarri ascended to “jefe de Comunión Tradicionalista en Aragón”, the position he reportedly held until 1933. However, in 1932 in the press he was noted merely as “señor” and a CT organigram from early 1932 does not list him as a leader either on regional or provincial level; the regional Aragón organisation was led by Carlos Ram de Víu Aréval and the provincial Zaragoza one by Manuel de Ardid. It is only in 1933 that Ulibarri started to appear as “delegado regional” and represent Junta Regional in Spanish party executive, though he did not feature among nationwide important Carlist protagonists. However, his tenure as the regional Aragon leader was rather brief. In March 1934 he was noted merely as treasurer of Junta Regional de Aragón, presided by Jesús Comín, and in 1935 the press noted him as “ex jefe regional”; he would not assume any role in either Aragonese or Navarrese Carlist structures until outbreak of the civil war.

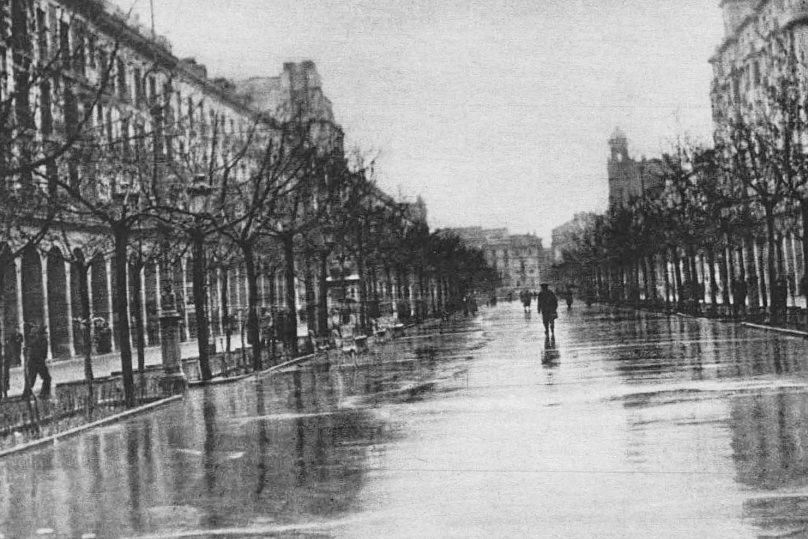
Zaragoza street, 1934

Since the early months of the Second Republic Ulibarri took park in labors intended to unite local right-wing opposition; in December 1931 he was noted as co-signatory of a manifesto, which launched Unión de Derechas; this provincial Zaragoza alliance was supposed to group the Carlists from Comunión Tradicionalista and politicians from Acción Nacional. In 1932 he was present during a meeting in Centro de Acción, with Gil-Robles as the key speaker, and prior to 1933 elections he co-signed an electoral manifesto of the local Unión de Derechas. In the mid-1930s he co-operated closely with Ramón Serrano Suñer, not only supporting his CEDA candidacy from Zaragoza during the 1936 elections, but reportedly also as a person who inspired Serrano to run for the Cortes. For reasons which are not clear, having spent 25 years in Zaragoza in late 1934 Ulibarri moved to Tafalla, even though seasonally he used to live in the Aragonese capital.

== Civil War, early months ==
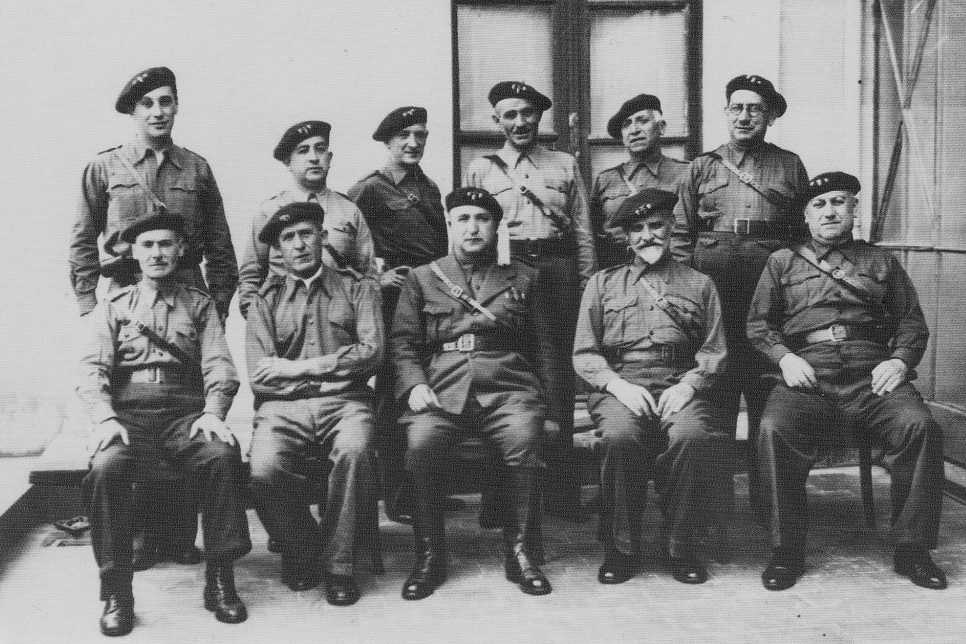
Ulibarri (sitting 1fL) in JCCGN

Ulibarri was involved in conspiracy talks leading to Carlist taking part in the July Coup; the national leader Manuel Fal Conde counted him among the faction who did not believe in a standalone insurrection, but who advocated a joint Carlist-military action instead. Some sources credit his effort as "responsable carlista de transportes", which enabled "participación masiva" of Navarrese volunteers in the rising. Others find it surprising that as a person who had spent 25 years beyond Navarre, Ulibarri entered Junta Central Carlista de Guerra de Navarra (JCCGN), a wartime Carlist regional executive. In the Junta he represented the merindad of Tafalla and formed part of Delegación de Intendencia y Transporte of JCCGN. Though in some sources Ulibarri is referred to as "militar navarro de tendencia carlista" "militar carlí", "requeté Marcelino Ulibarri", "Navarre Carlist officer Marcelino Ulibarri", or "a Carlist professional soldier" there is no evidence he has ever served either in military or paramilitary structures.

There is almost no information on Ulibarri's JCCGN engagements during the remainder of 1936, except that in December together with few Carlist Navarrese heavyweights he visited Franco in his headquarters in Salamanca. One purpose was to discuss a prisoner exchange, engineered by the Navarrese which Franco disapproved of. Another was the question of the Carlist leader Manuel Fal Conde having been exiled on trumped-up charges of disloyalty. During the meeting Ulibarri tried to arrange Fal's return to Nationalist zone, though he also criticised Junta Nacional Carlista de Guerra, the central Carlist wartime executive, for not having co-ordinated its initiatives with the military. In daily dealings he also advocated close alignment with the army; in January 1937, when discussing would-be revenge measures in response to Republican killings of Traditionalist pundits in Bilbao prisons, he supported retaliation but in framework of official military justice, as "one can not ignore law when willing to do justice" and in order not to "follow the rules implemented by the reds".

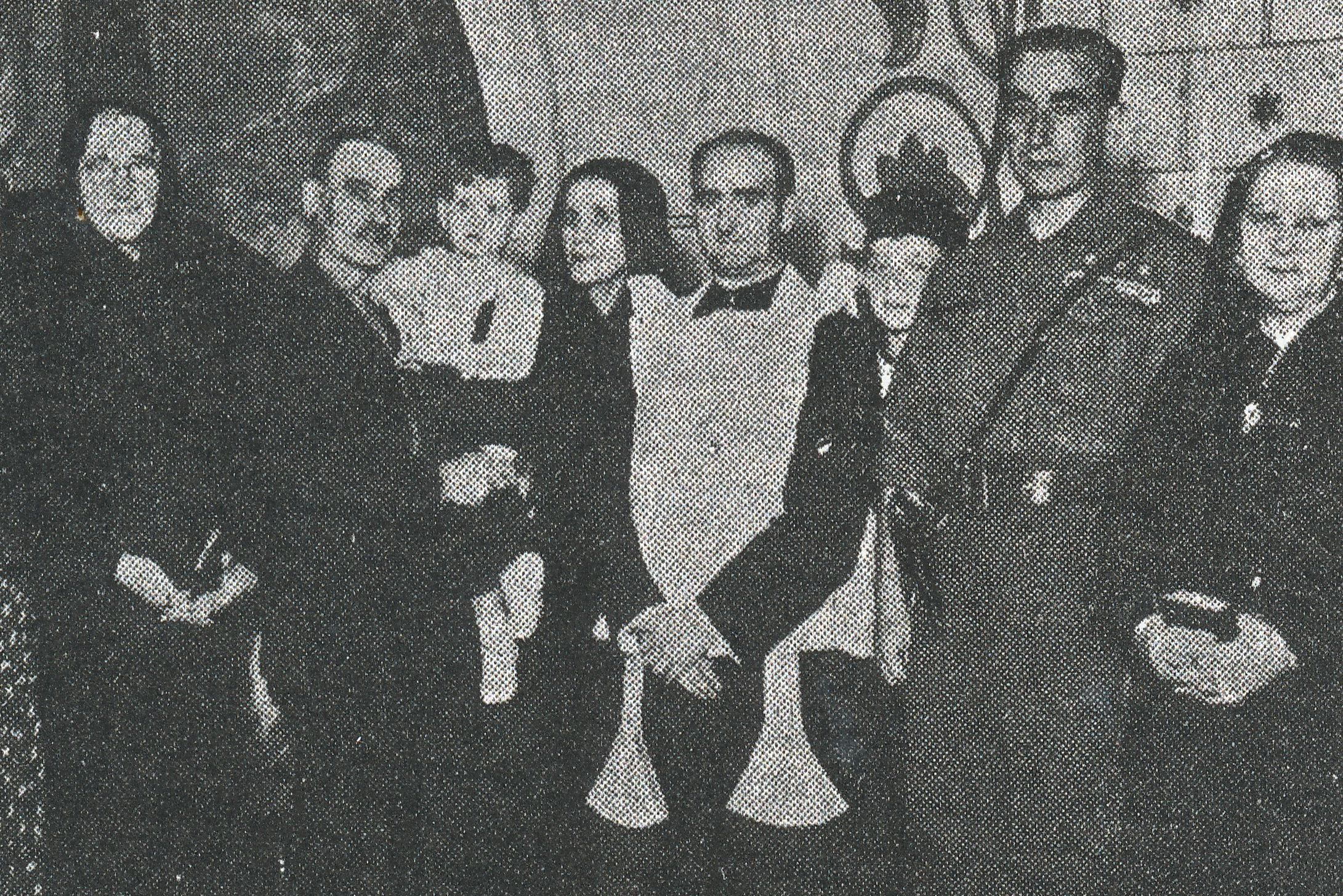
Ulibarri (2fL), September 1936

When Carlists faced the threat of would-be forced amalgamation into a new state party, Ulibarri was in favor of complying with the military dictate. In late March he was within a delegation sent by JCCGN to Saint-Jean-de-Luz to convince the regent-claimant, Don Javier. In Franco's headquarters he was viewed as one of the tractable Carlists. In early April he was among 4 leaders invited to Salamanca, where generalísimo briefed them on terms of the forthcoming unification. When discussing personalities with Rodezno, Franco suggested that Ulibarri be among 3 Carlists to enter the 10-member executive of Falange Española Tradicionalista, just about to be launched. However, Rodezno responded that too many Navarros in Junta Política would not make a good impression, and eventually Ulibarri was replaced by Carlists from La Rioja and from Madrid. He later declared himself a fervent supporter of the unification, yet some scholars claim that Ulibarri was not on good terms with the Falangist sector of the regime.

== DNAE and SRD ==
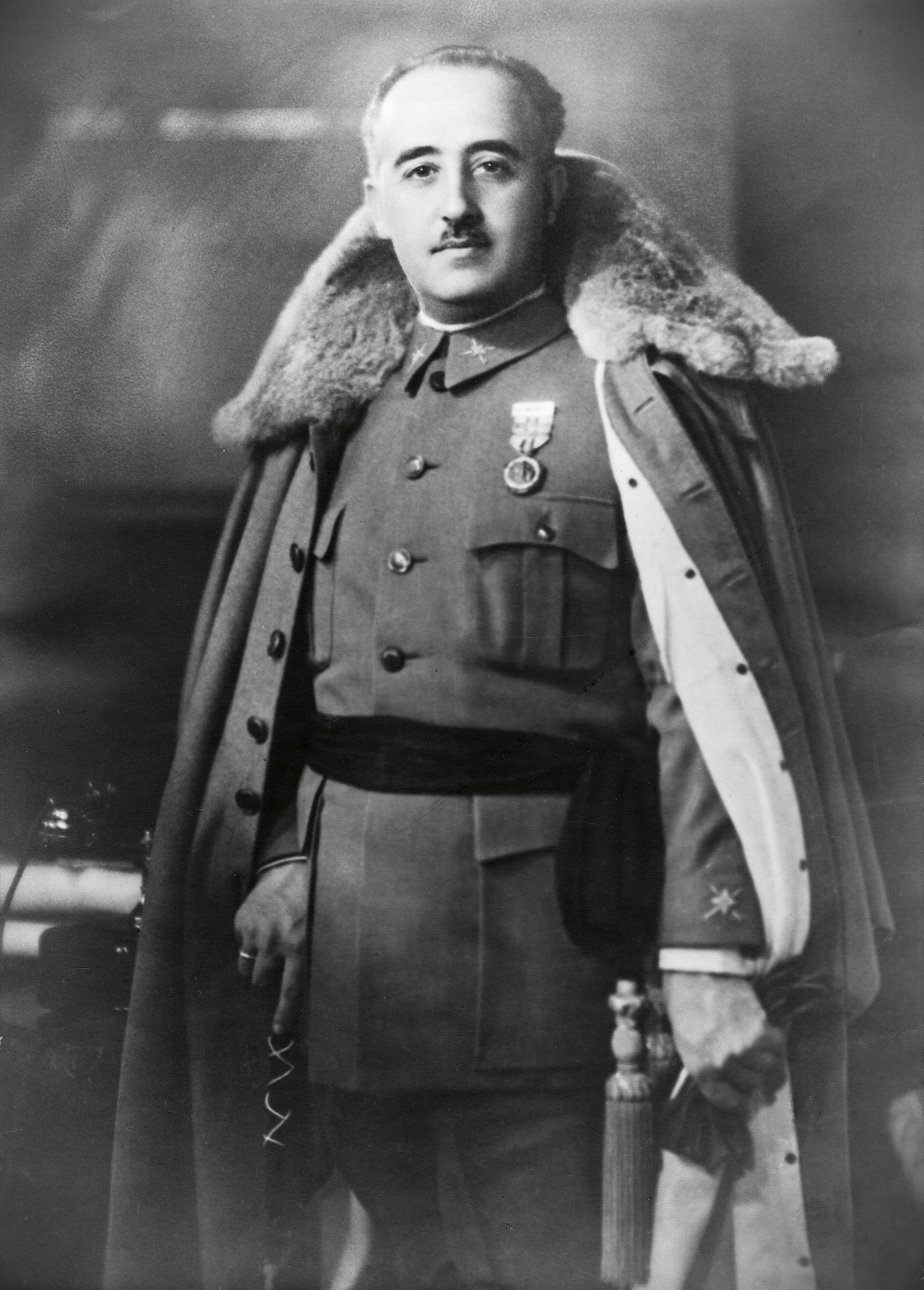
Franco, 1930s

In April 1937 Nicolás Franco, head of Secretaría General del Jefe de Estado, set up Oficina de Investigación y Propaganda Anti-Comunista (OIPA); its principal task was to comb newly seized territories for documents produced by Communist structures. Some authors claim that it was Ulibarri who “planted in the mind of his powerful friend” (i.e. Franco) the idea of creating an investigative body, which materialized as OIPA, and some even maintain that he was heading the Office, but other scholars do not mention him as related. Historiographic works do not agree on further fate of the institution, though from scholarly narratives it appears that it was soon either merged with or amalgamated into other similar bodies.

In May 1937 Franco's Secretaría Particular set up Delegación Nacional de Asuntos Especiales (DNAE), affiliated to Secretaría General; its task was to recover and collect all documents related to masonic activity, especially on newly seized territories. Ulibarri as Delegado Nacional was nominated head of the institution. Some sources claim that he was also nominated director of another investigative body, Servicio de Recuperación de Documentos (SRD), set up in June 1937 as branch of Cuartel General; this one was entrusted with similar task, but related to Communist activity. Other sources do not mention such an institution.

Many scholars discuss Ulibarri's nomination against the background of his alleged friendship with Franco, reportedly dating back to the 1928–1931 years in Zaragoza, and their common anti-masonic obsession. Others prefer rather to underline his close familiarity with Serrano Suñer, who has just emerged as Franco's key advisor and architect of the new regime; reportedly he was responsible for Ulibarri's nomination. Some mention Ulibarri's alleged propaganda role in JCCGN as a key motive behind the appointment. His manifested distance towards the intransigent Carlist stand of Fal Conde has also gained him trust in Franco's headquarters. None of the sources consulted discusses Ulibarri's record in La Equitativa, which has provided him with experience and competence in terms of investigation, document circulation and database management.

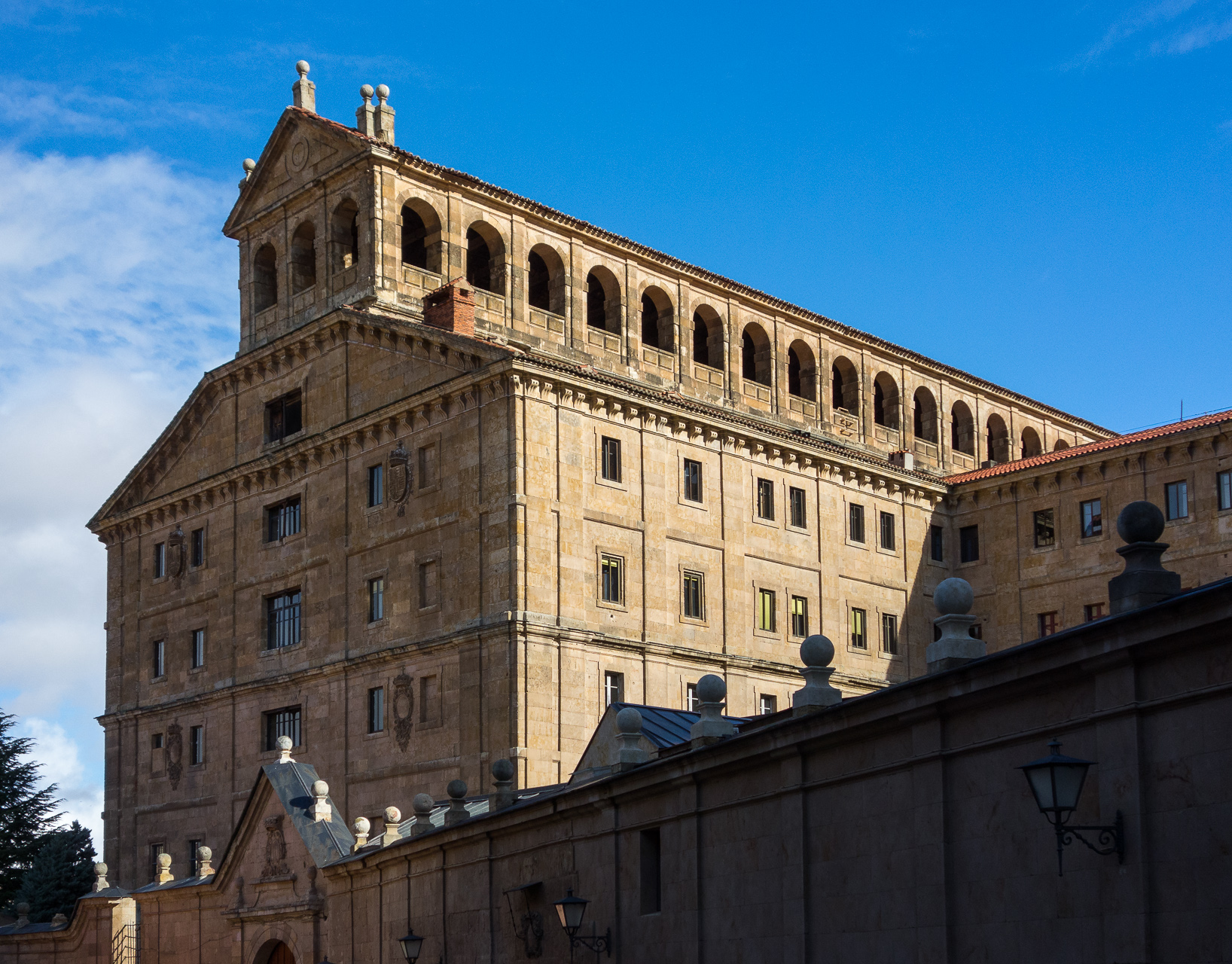
Seminario Mayor, first site of DNAE

It is not clear how numerous the DNAE staff was; the institution was based in what used to be Seminario Mayor in Salamanca. Its first major task was related to the Nationalist conquest of Biscay in June 1937, though it is not clear whether Ulibarri personally travelled to Bilbao. It is known that as part of his duties he was involved in compiling a list of Catholic priests, engaged in Basque Nationalist propaganda; reportedly 6 of them have later been persecuted. As the Nationalist offensive in the northern enclave progressed, in August Ulibarri and his men travelled to freshly seized Santander to comb out Republican documentation left behind. Documents were packed and transported to Salamanca, where an increasingly large makeshift archive started to emerge in the DNAE premises.

== DERD ==
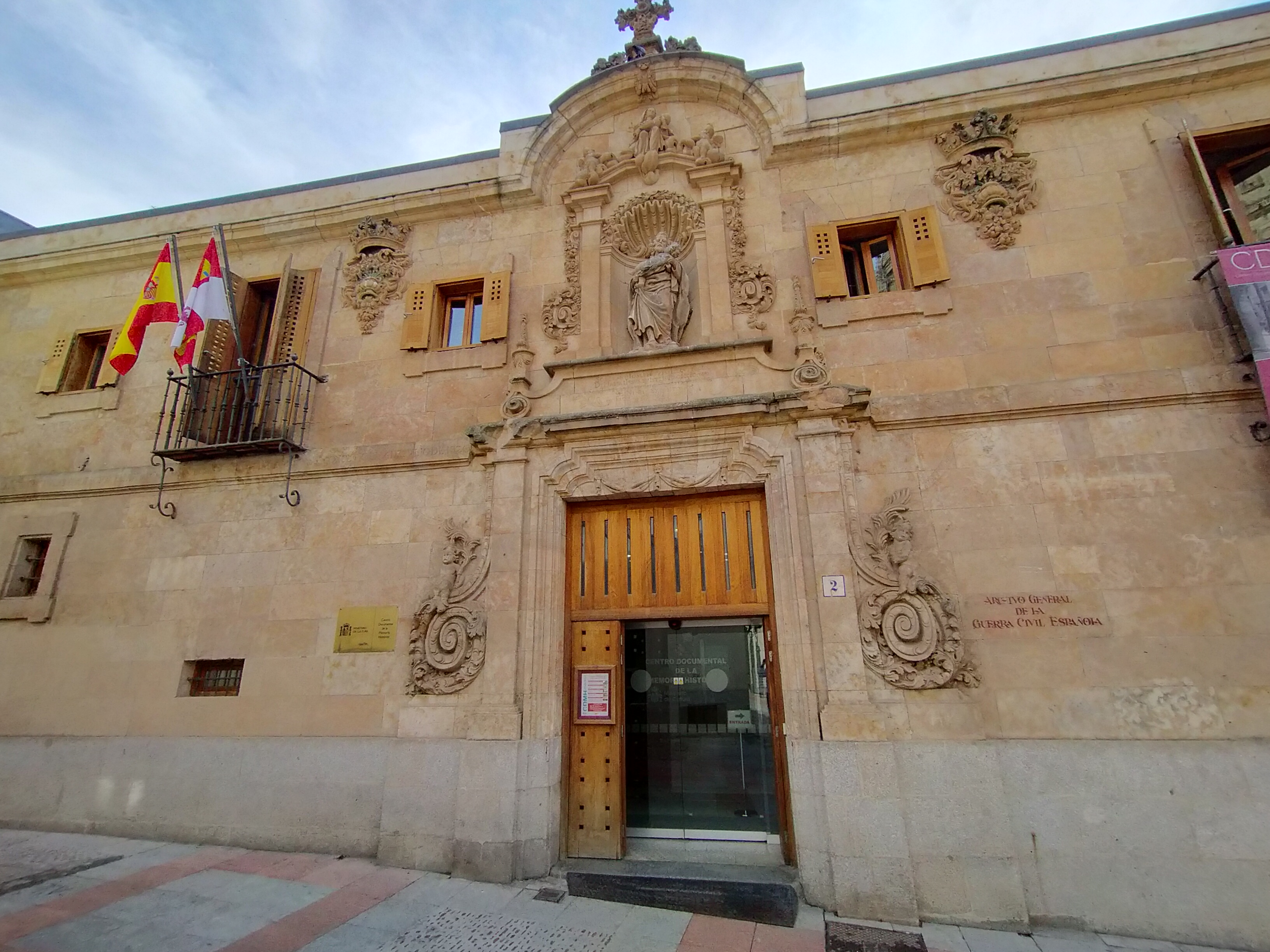
Colegio San Ambrosio

In April 1938 the provisional ministry of interior, headed by Serrano Suñer, issued a decree which established Delegación del Estado para Recuperación de Documentos (DERD). Affiliated to Ministerio de la Gobernación though partially supervised by the military, it was to recover, collect, catalogue and store all official documents produced by the Republicans, not only these related to freemasonry or Communist propaganda. Most scholars claim that DERD replaced all previously existing similar bodies, including DNAE and SRD (some claim also OIPA), which were merged within the new structure. In May Ulibarri as Delegado de Estado was nominated the head of DERD, to be moved from Seminario Mayor to Colegio San Ambrosio in Salamanca.

Following Nationalist takeover of Castellón in June 1938 Ulibarri did not go to the Mediterranean coast himself, but nominated his deputies to run the search for documents. At the time he was busy building the team and working out related admin and logistics routine. He was also overwhelmed by massive growth of the archive and tried to arrange new premises as its permanent location, in Salamanca or elsewhere; he was increasingly anxious about would-be fire or sabotage. In December 1938 he claimed having collected 5m documents, and in a letter to Franco declared 15.000 individual files on freemasons on the shelves. In January and February 1939 Ulibarri led a team of 80 DERD staff who combed Barcelona. They later returned to Salamanca with 3,500 bags, 160 tons of paper and 1.800 documentary units, though in April he had to move to Madrid to organize similar search in the capital. The experience rendered him "a genuine expert in purging the offices". Throughout the process he was frequently involved in conflict with other services, e.g. the Falange intelligence unit, DGS, and SIPM, apart from clashes with Juan Tusquets, who was reluctant to hand over documentation he had earlier collected. Ulibarri's relations with other institutions remained tense; he was very restrictive as to sharing the documents, even though was forced to transfer some collections elsewhere.

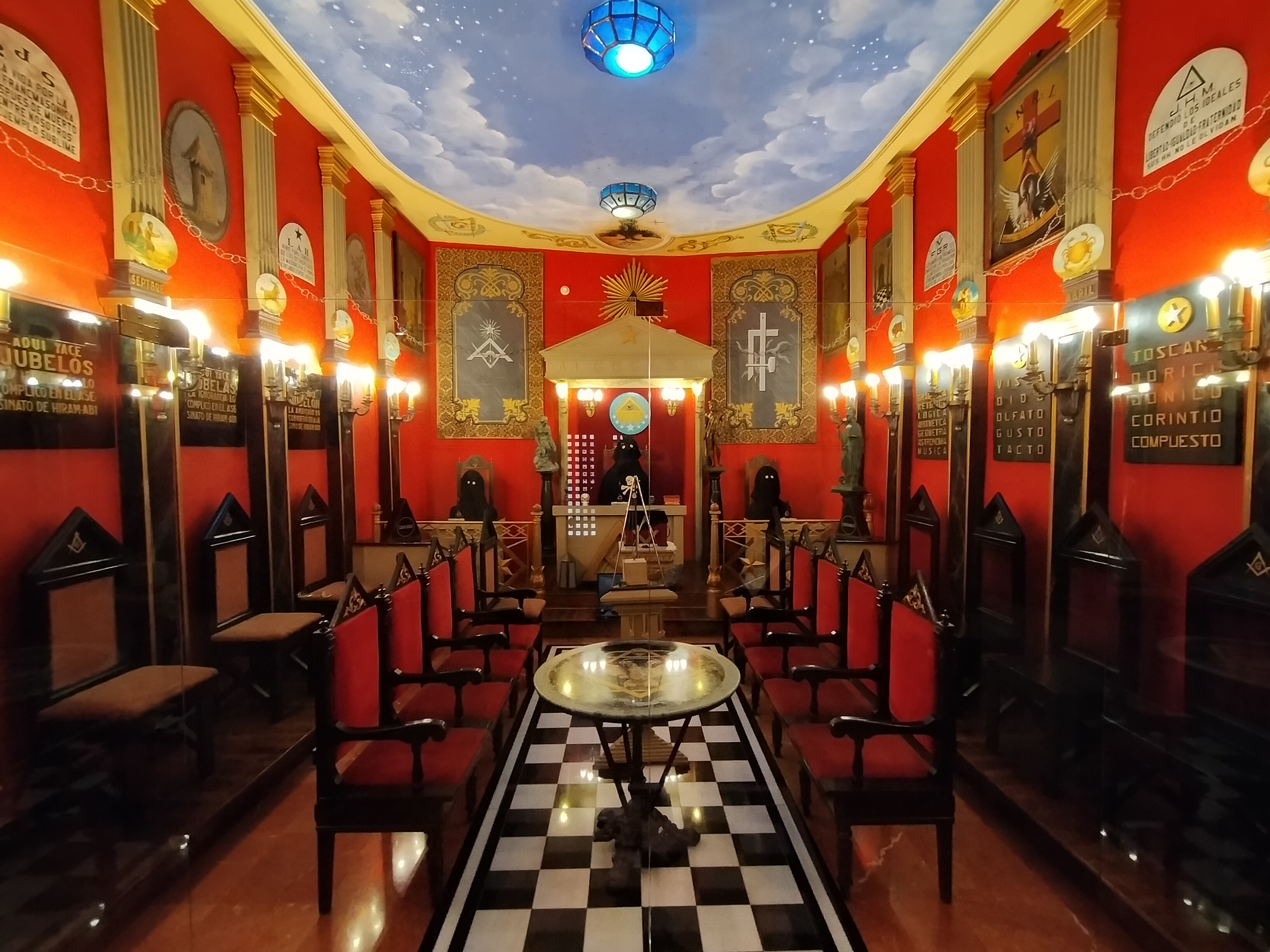
Museo de la masonería today

After the war Ulibarri tried to move the archive to El Escorial under the changed name of "Archivos Documentales de la Cruzada de España", the efforts which proved unsuccessful; he would attempt to find a new site for the ever-growing archive until 1941, with a few various locations suggested. He also recommended that DERD engages in education – which in few years produced opening of an internal Museo de la Masonería - and restructuring the institution, with one of its sections assuming a juridical role. Another of his proposals featured issuing "certificado de antecedentes", a document summarizing previous activity of given individual. However, in the early 1940s Ulibarri was decreasingly interested in DERD. Since 1942 frequently absent on sick leave in Tafalla, the same year he formally asked to be released. His request was granted in 1944, when DERD was transformed into Delegación Nacional de Servicios Documentales (DNSD), the body operational until 1977. When he was leaving, the institution held 3m individual files.

== TERMC ==
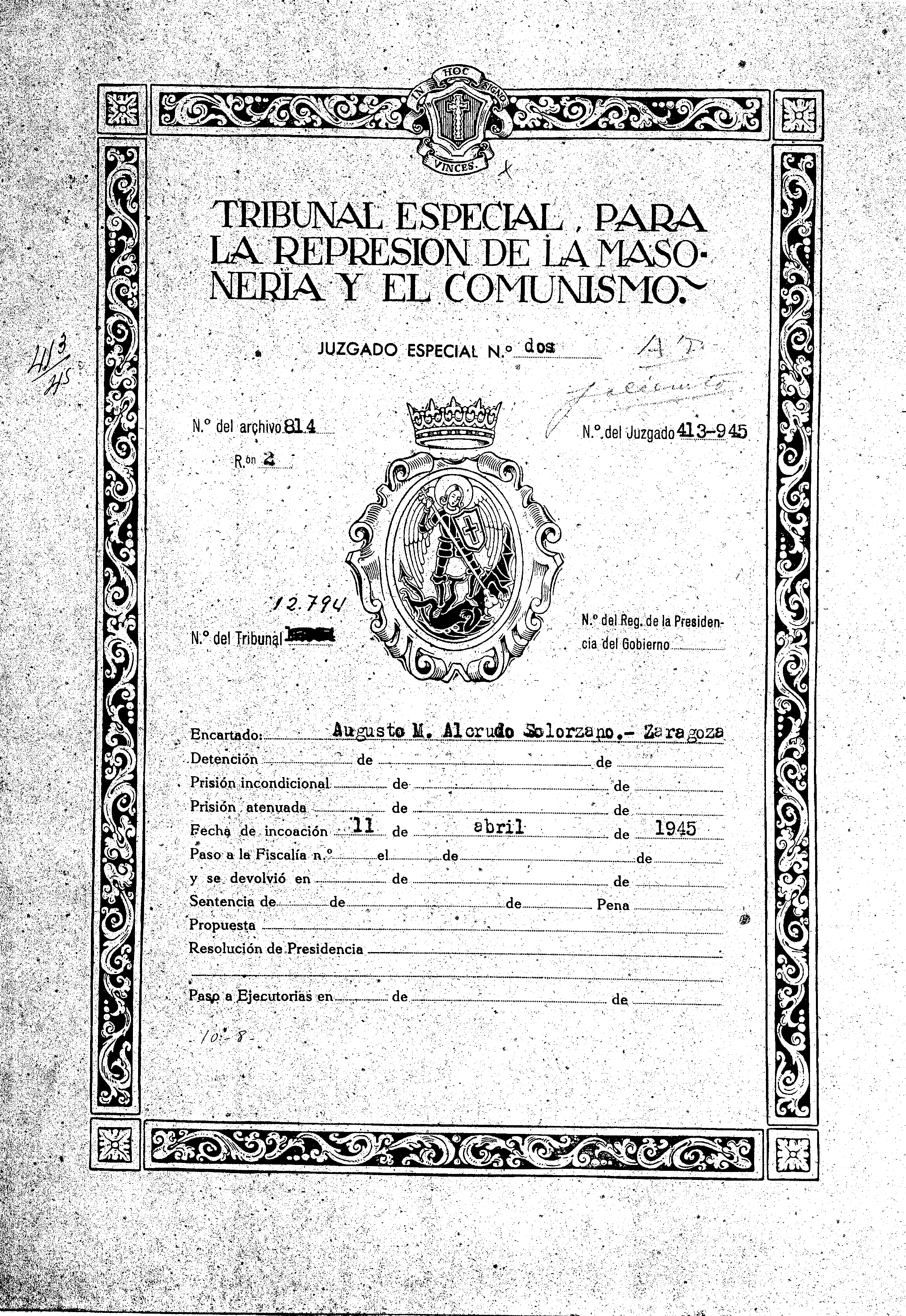
TERMC verdict

Already in 1939 Ulibarri suggested in his memorandum that DERD as a restructured institution should assume juridical functions. It is not clear whether his proposals contributed to further developments, of which the first step was Ley para la Represión de la Masonería y el Comunismo, published in March 1940. It declared membership in masonic or Communist organizations a crime, and in one of its paragraphs envisioned setup of a "tribunal especial", to deal with such offences in case of civilians. The tribunal in question materialized in June 1940 as Tribunal Especial para la Represión de la Masonería y el Comunismo (TERMC), one of 25 special tribunals set up by the early Francoist regime. Composed of 6 members, it was to be presided by Ulibarri. Like in case of other institutions, scholars speculate that the appointment might have been related to Ulibarri's friendship either with Franco or with Serrano and his zealous anti-masonic and anti-Communist views, apart from his successful record in DERD.

During the second half of 1940 Ulibarri was busy working on both legal groundwork and internal rules of the Tribunal. In case of the former he turned to academic experts in penal law like Isaías Sánchez Tejerina from the University of Salamanca, asking them for advice as to legal framework of the persecution. In case of the latter he tried to devise the modus operandi himself, guided by the principle that the anti-masonic and anti-Communist justice should be dispensed fast and with few formalities. He underlined that "excesiva preocupación legalista" should be avoided; he also opted for non-public proceedings performed in absence of the person investigated and with no assistance on part of professionals in law. Like in case of other special tribunals, there was no appeal envisioned.

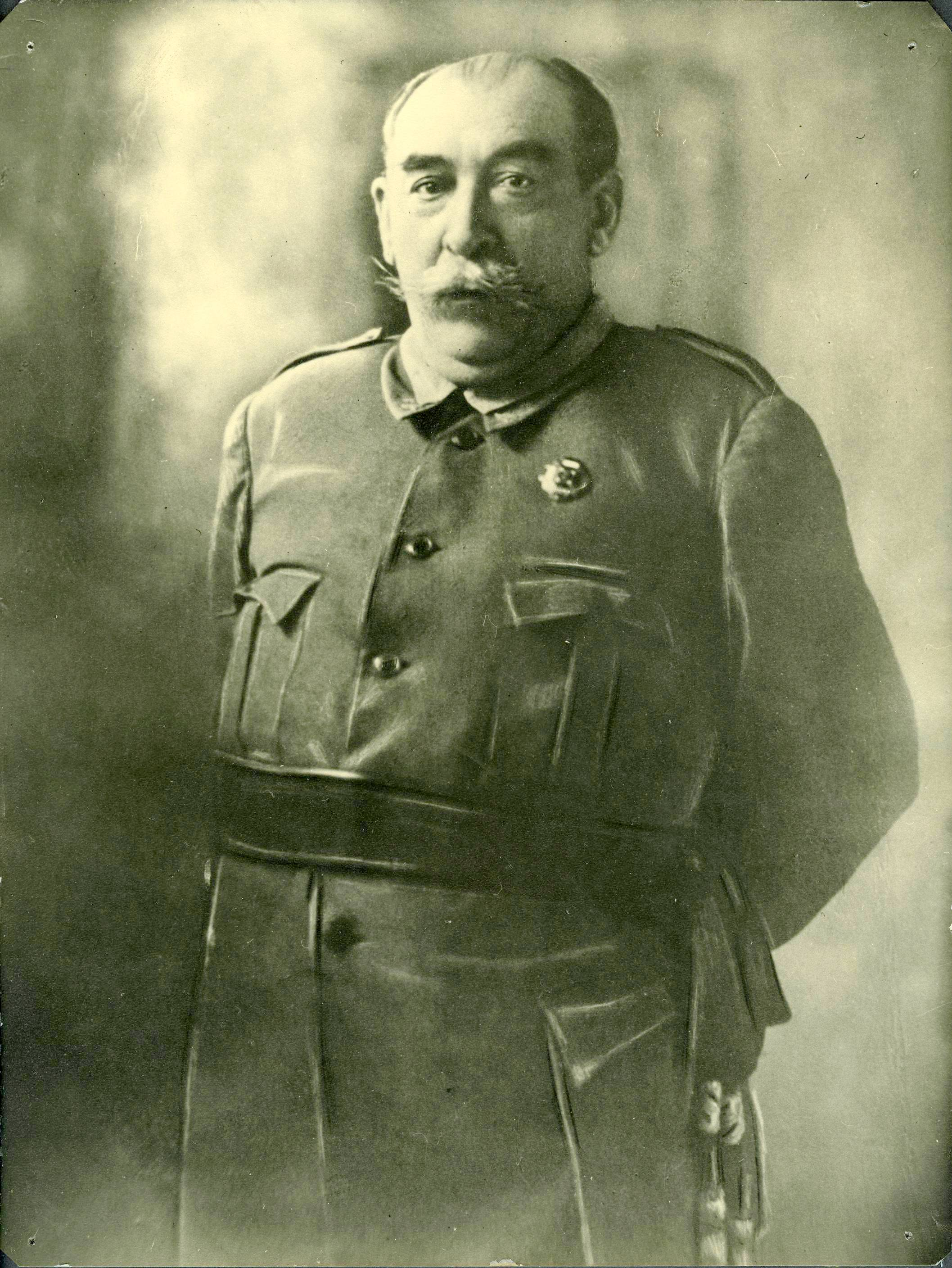
Andrés Saliquet

Before the Tribunal had its first sitting, in early 1941 Ulibarri resigned from the presidency; reasons are not known. A new decree, issued in March 1941, nominated members of the tribunal anew; the presidency went to general Andres Saliquet, and Ulibarri was merely one of 6 members. TERMC started to operate in April 1941, and its first sentences were delivered in September against numerous Republican personalities, all of them on exile, Diego Martínez Barrio having been the first one. Later the Tribunal sentenced also defunct politicians, like Andreu Nín. Ulibarri was not within the Tribunal jury which delivered first sentences, yet some scholars claim that he "was in charge of drafting the sentences during his first year". TERMC launched 64.000 investigations during 25 years of its existence, but t is not clear in how many proceedings Ulibarri did take part before in 1942 he quoted health reasons and asked to be released. It is not known when his request was granted. Last known case of Ulibarri forming part of the tribunal is dated 1945 and refers to Elías Ahúja Andría, who was declared not guilty.

== Dignitary ==
Falangist standard

Though in April 1937 Franco intended to nominate Ulibarri to Junta Política of Falange Española Tradicionalista and abandoned the idea only upon the advice of Rodezno, in October 1937 he neither nominated Ulibarri to Consejo Nacional, another and somewhat less empowered executive body of FET. Its 2-year-term was about to expire in the autumn of 1939 and in September Franco nominated members of the II. Consejo. This time Ulibarri was included, positioned as the last one on the list of 90 nominees. In the mammoth body which provided its members with little decision-making power, but mattered in terms of prestige and position within the regime, he featured as one of 14 Carlists. In November 1942 the III. Consejo Nacional was appointed; this time Ulibarri was listed as 59th on the list of 95 nominees, 12 of them Carlists.

In early 1943 the Francoist regime underwent one of its final formal re-definitions when Cortes Españolas, a quasi-parliament, has been established; some view it as a measure of fascization of the regime, others see it rather as a first step towards de-fascization. By default all members of the FET Consejo Nacional became so-called procuradores in the chamber, which referred also to Ulibarri. This sequence of events was repeated 3 times. In May 1946 Franco appointed Ulibarri to IV. FET Consejo Nacional (on position 24 out of 50), which the same month translated to his mandate into the II. Cortes. In May 1949 he was appointed to the V. FET Consejo Nacional (on position 23 out of 49), which the same month was acknowledged by a mandate to the III. Cortes; Ulibarri held it until his death.

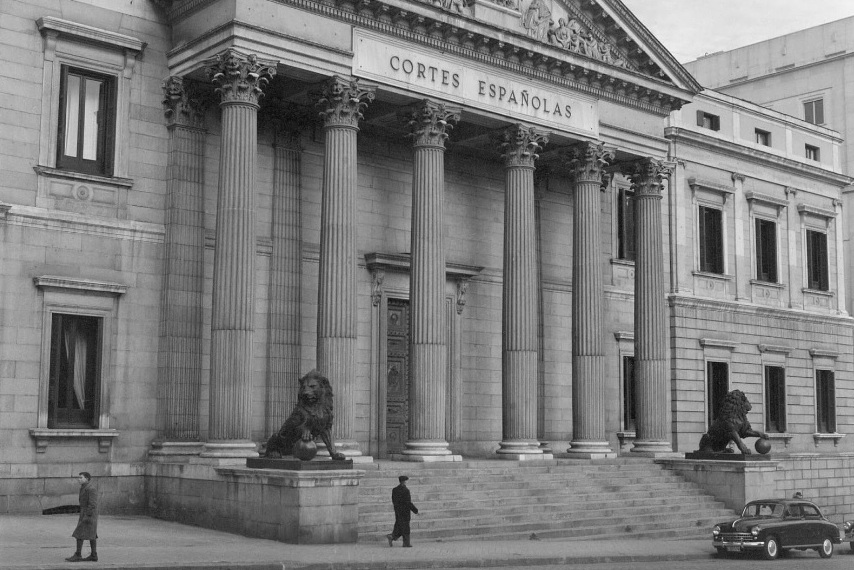
Cortes Españolas

Having resigned his positions in DERD and TERMC Ulibarri had no real power, be it in political or other terms, even though the press reported him as engaged in various legislative works and some sources suggest some influence on personal appointments in Francoist administration, e.g. in 1940–1941 in Valencia. However, seats in Consejo Nacional and Cortes ensured his position within the titular elite of the regime. In 1944 he was awarded 2 prestigious honors, Orden de Cisneros and Gran Cruz de la Orden del Mérito Civil. He terminated any links to mainstream Carlism, either on the regional Navarrese or the national level, and though featuring among best-known so-called carlo-franquistas, he also counted among “conocidos disidentes tradicionalistas”. In his final years in the late 1940s and early 1950s and reportedly for health reasons he withdrew to privacy; his death was noted in the press with moderate and not necessarily accurate acknowledgements.

== In historiography ==
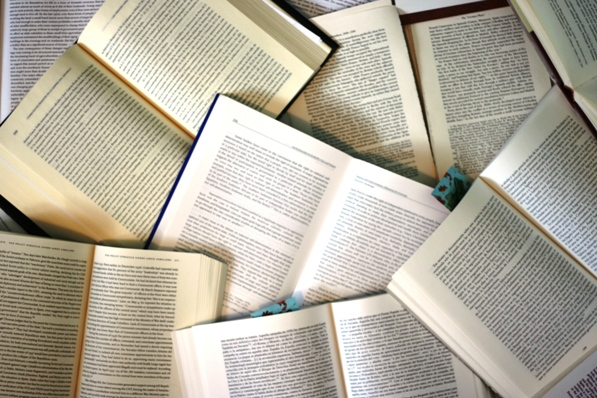

Until the mid-1930s and during most of his lifetime Ulibarri remained a private figure, apart from local Navarrese and Aragonese Carlist circles mentioned only in societé column of Pamplona and Zaragoza newspapers. His rather specific 1937–1942 role first in DNAE and then in DERD was not subject to media focus. Neither his brief term in TERMC received more than perfunctory media coverage, and in the 1940s his name appeared in papers rather in long-winded lists of Consejo Nacional appointees. His death has passed almost unacknowledged, and afterwards his name has gone into almost complete oblivion. If appearing in history books, e.g. in Joaquín Arrarás’ work on Republic and war (1968) or in Eduardo Alvárez Puga's history of Falange (1969) he appeared very briefly in relation to Carlism and Unification.

Things took a sharp turn after the fall of the regime. Mushrooming works on Francoist repression, terror, its anti-democratic character, its victims, its oppressive structures etc. started to mention Ulibarri, and until today he is present in scores of books, usually noted only en passant. He is listed among personalities responsible for buildup of the criminal Francoist system and his work is dubbed "key element in the information system underpinning the New State's judicial structure". If dedicated few sentences, he is presented as a somewhat psychopathic personality, marked by numerous obsessions: about Freemasonry ("obsessive anti-Freemasonry that Ulibarri shared with Franco"), about secrecy ("el secretismo y la seguridad, que se requería para trabajar en el mismo, en periodo de guerra, y que, a Marcelino de Ulibarri, tanto obsesionaba") or about sabotage ("siempre lo obsesionó la idea que ‘su’ Archivo sufriera algún acto de sabotaje, en forma de incendio provocado"). Some suggest he was managing sort of a secular Francoist Inquisition.

So far no author has attempted to scrutinize Ulibarri's work in terms of professional competence as the manager of DNAE and DERD, be it when it comes to archival tasks (e.g. database architecture, cataloguing systems, document storage, data proliferation patterns) or to the investigative dimension (documentation recovery, data analysis, research methodologies). In some works he is referred to as "un personaje misterioso y con una biografía desconocida" and presented as sort of grey eminence, counted among "personalidades más grises y desconocidas". His 25-year spell in Zaragoza remains barely known, especially in terms of his professional engagements. Numerous studies replicate information which is either erroneous (e.g. about his alleged career of a professional military man) or not sourced (e.g. about his alleged friendship with Franco during the Zaragoza days of 1928–1931). There are two works, both PhD dissertations, where he was paid more attention: the one on DERD archive mentioned him 118 times and in the one on anti-masonic measures against females he was dedicated a separate sub-chapter.

== See also ==
- Carlo-francoism
- Carlism
- White Terror (Spain)
- Francoist Spain
