= Illia =

Illia may refer to:

- Illia (Ukrainian: Ілля), the Ukrainian male given name and a variant of Ilya
- Arturo Umberto Illia, an Argentine politician.
