= Sveti Ilija =

Sveti Ilija (lit. 'Saint Elijah') may refer to:

- Sveti Ilija, Varaždin County, a village and a municipality in Croatia
- Sveti Ilija (Serbia), a mountain near Vranje in Serbia
- Sveti Ilija (Pelješac), a mountain peak on the Pelješac peninsula in Croatia
- Sveti Ilija (Biokovo), a peak of the Biokovo mountain in Croatia
  - Sveti Ilija Tunnel, road tunnel through the Biokovo mountain
- Sveti Ilija (Rilić), a peak of the Rilić mountain in Croatia
- Sveti Ilija, Vranje, a hamlet of a village in Serbia

== See also ==
- Ilija (given name)
- Saint Elias (disambiguation)
