= Monte Sant'Elia =

Monte Sant'Elia is the name of several mountains:

- Monte Sant'Elia (Massafra), a mountain of Massafra
- Monte Sant'Elia (Palmi), a mountain of Calabria
- Monte Sant'Elia (Varese Prealps), a mountain in the Varese Prealps
- Monte Sant'Elia-Calimosca, an Italian mountain near Cagliari

== See also ==
- Mount Saint Elias, Alaska, USA; a mountain
- Saint Elias Mountains, Alaska, USA; a mountain range
- Mount St Elijah, Israel; a massif
- Sant'Elia (disambiguation)
- Elia (disambiguation)
