= Ilija =

Ilija may refer to:

- Ilija, Iran, a village in Ardabil Province, Iran
- Ilija, Slovakia, a village and municipality in the Banská Štiavnica District, in the Banská Bystrica Region
- Ilija (given name), South Slavic given name

== People with the surname ==
- Jože Ilija, Slovene canoeist

== See also ==
- Sveti Ilija (disambiguation)
