= Ilya =

- Gender: male

Origin
- Origin: East Slavic or alternatively Assyrian
- Meaning: "My god is Yahu/Jah" (Hebrew meaning) or Semitic origins of Aramaic and Akkadian.

Other names
- Related names: Elijah, Eliahu, Elias, Ilias, Iliya, Ilija, Iliusha, Ilyusha, Ilyushenka, Iliushechka, patronymics Ilyich and Ilyinichna

Ilya, Iliya, Ilia, Ilja, Ilija, or Illia (Russian: Илья́, romanized: Ilʹja [ɪlʲˈja], or Russian: Илия́, romanized: Ilija [ɪlʲɪˈja]; Ukrainian: Ілля́, romanized: Illia [iˈlʲːɑ]; Belarusian: Ілья́, romanized: Ilʹja [ilʲˈja]) is the East Slavic form of the male Hebrew name Eliyahu (Eliahu), meaning "My God is Yahu/Jah." It comes from the Byzantine Greek pronunciation of the vocative (Ilía) of the Greek Elias (Ηλίας, Ilías). It is pronounced with stress on the second syllable. The diminutive form is Iliusha or Iliushen'ka. The Russian patronymic for a son of Ilya is "Ilyich", and a daughter is "Ilyinichna".

== People with the name ==
=== Real people ===
- Ilia Kulik (born 1977), Russian figure skater, 1998 Olympic champion
- Ilia Malinin (born 2004), American figure skater, 2024, 2025 & 2026 World champion
- Ilya (Archbishop of Novgorod), 12th-century Russian Orthodox cleric and saint
- Ilya Borok (born 1993), Russian jiujitsu fighter
- Ilya Bryzgalov (born 1980), Russian ice hockey goalie
- Ilya Dzhirkvelov (1927–2006), author and KGB defector
- Ilya Ehrenburg (1891–1967), Russian writer and Soviet cultural ambassador
- Ilya Espino de Marotta, Marine engineer and leader of the Panama Canal Expansion Project
- Ilya Frank (1908–1990), Russian physicist
- Ilya Glazunov (1930–2017), Russian painter
- Ilya Gringolts (born 1982), Russian violinist
- Ilya Grubert (born 1954), Latvian violinist
- Ilya Ilf (1897–1937), Russian author of Twelve Chairs and the Golden Calf
- Ilya Ilyin (born 1988), Kazakhstani Olympic weightlifter
- Ilya I. Alekseyev (1772–1830), commander of the Russian Imperial Army
- Ilya Ivashka (born 1994), Belarusian tennis player
- Ilya Kabakov (1933–2023), Russian-American conceptual artist of Jewish origin
- Ilya Kaler (born 1963), Russian-American violinist
- Ilya Kaminsky (born 1977), Ukrainian-American-Jewish poet
- Ilya Kazakov (footballer) (born 1978), Russian footballer
- Ilya Kazakov (journalist) (born 1972), Russian football commentator, TV presenter and journalist
- Ilya Kharun (born 2005), Canadian swimmer
- Ilya Kovalchuk (born 1983), Russian ice hockey winger in the KHL, formerly for the Atlanta Thrashers, New Jersey Devils, L.A. Kings and Washington Capitals of the NHL
- Ilya Kuvshinov (born 1990), Russian animator
- Ilya Lagutenko (born 1968), lead singer of the Russian rock band Mumiy Troll
- Ilya Lobanov (born 1996), Kazakhstani ice hockey player
- Ilya Mechnikov (1845–1916), Russian Nobel Prize-winning microbiologist
- Ilya Mizernykh (born 2007), Kazakhstani ski jumper
- Ilya Oberyshyn (1921–2007), Ukrainian insurgent
- Ilya Osipov (born 2005), nicknamed "m0NESY", Russian professional Counter-Strike 2 player for Team Falcons
- Ilya Petrov (born 1995), Russian footballer
- Ilya Piatetski-Shapiro (1929–2009), Russian-Jewish-Israeli mathematician
- Ilya Prigogine (1917–2003), physical chemist and Nobel Prize-winning physicist
- Ilya Prusikin (born 1985), Russian musician, singer, record producer, vlogger, video director and screenwriter
- Ilya Remeslo (born 1983), Russian lawyer and blogger
- Ilya Repin (1844–1930), Russian painter
- Ilya Salkind (born 1947), movie producer
- Ilya Salmanzadeh (born 1986), Persian-Swedish music producer
- Ilya Samsonov (born 1997), a Russian goaltender for the Toronto Maple Leafs, formerly Washington Capitals
- Ilya Serov (born 1986), Russian-American trumpeter and singer
- Ilya Sorokin (born 1995), a Russian goaltender for the New York Islanders
- Ilya Strebulaev, Russian-American financial economist
- Ilya Sutskever (born 1986), computer scientist, co-founder and former chief scientist of OpenAI
- Ilya Tsipursky (1934–2022), Soviet judoka and sambist
- Ilya Ulyanov (1831–1886), father of Soviet revolutionary Vladimir Lenin
- Ilya Yashin (born 1983), Russian political figure
- Ilya Zhitomirskiy (1989–2011), Russian-American founder of Diaspora

=== Religious figures ===
- Ali or Eli (Arabic name), a cousin and son-in-law of the Islamic prophet Muhammad, and the first Imam of shiahs. (There is a quote from Imam Ali "I am called Elya / Alya among Jews, Elia among Christians, Ali for my father, and Haydar for my mother".)
- Elijah, a Hebrew prophet of the ninth century BCE, known in Russian as Iliya the Prophet (Илия́ Проро́к)
- Ilya Muromets, Orthodox monastic saint, Russian folk hero

=== Fictional characters ===
- Illya Kuryakin, a main character in the TV show The Man from U.N.C.L.E.
- Illyasviel von Einzbern, a character in Fate series by Type-Moon
- Ilya Rozanov, a character in the Game Changers novel series and its television adaptation Heated Rivalry
- Ilya (Ilyusha) Snegiryov, a character in Fyodor Dostoevsky's The Brothers Karamazov
- Ilya Afanasyevich Shamrayev, a character in Anton Chekhov's The Seagull
- Ilya in the book Letters from Rifka
- Ilya Pasternak, fictional character from the video game Ace Combat 6: Fires of Liberation
- Ilya Stepanovich Igolkin, a character in Vladimir Obruchev's Plutonia
- Ilya Tretiak, a character in the 1997 film The Saint
- Ilya, a character in the book and film adaption Heaven Knows What

== Music ==
- Illya Kuryaki and the Valderramas

== See also ==
- Eli
- Elia (disambiguation)
- Iliya (name)
- Ilyin
- Ilyinka
- Ilyino
- Ilyinsky (disambiguation)
