= Elphas =

Elphas is a masculine given name of Southern African origin.

It may refer to:

- Elphas Buthelezi, South African politician
- Elphas Ginindza (born 1967), Swazi long-distance runner
- Elphas Mukonoweshuro (c. 1953 – 2011). Zimbabwean political scientist and politician

== See also ==
- Elias
- Elphaba
- Elphias
