= Ilja =

Ilja is a given name and surname. The given name is cognate to Ilya.

Notable people with the given name include:

- Ilja Bereznickas (born 1948), Lithuanian animator, illustrator, scriptwriter and caricaturist
- Ilja Bergh (1927–2015), Danish pianist and composer
- Ilja Dragunov (born 1993), Russian professional wrestler
- Ilja Glebov (born 1987), Estonian pair skater
- Ilja Hurník (1922–2013), Czech composer, pianist and essayist
- Ilja Leonard Pfeijffer (born 1968), Dutch poet, novelist, polemicist and classic scholar
- Ilja Richter (born 1952), German actor
- Ilja Rosendahl (born 1968), German film and music producer, actor, songwriter and musician
- Ilja Seifert (1951–2022), German politician
- Ilja Szrajbman (1907–1943), Polish Olympic freestyle swimmer
- Ilja Venäläinen (born 1980), Finnish football player
- Ilja Wiederschein (born 1977), volleyball player from Germany

Notable people with the surname include:

- Ivari Ilja, Estonian pianist best known for his work as an accompanist
- Joze Ilja, Yugoslav slalom canoeist who competed in the mid-1950s
- Voldemar Ilja (1922–2010), Estonian Lutheran clergyman, theologian and church historian

== See also ==
- Ilya, Belarus, also transliterated as Ilja
- Ilia, given name
- Ilija, given name
