= Sant'Elia =

Sant'Elia, Elia being the Italian name for the prophet Elijah, may refer to:

== Places ==
Places in Italy:

- Sant'Elia a Pianisi, a commune in the Province of Campobasso
- Castel Sant'Elia, a commune in the Province of Viterbo
- Sant'Elia Fiumerapido, a comune in the Province of Frosinone
- Sant'Elia (Rieti), a frazione of Rieti
- Sant'Elia (L'Aquila), a frazione of L'Aquila
- Sant'Elia (Santa Flavia), a frazione of Santa Flavia in the Province of Palermo

Places outside Italy

- Mount Saint Elias a peak in North America climbed in the 19th century by the Duke of Abruzzi.

== People ==
- Sant'Elia di Enna (829–904), an Italian monk from Enna, venerated as a saint in the Catholic and Orthodox churches
- Sant'Elia Speleota (863–960), an Italian saint from Reggio Calabria, venerated in the Catholic and Orthodox churches
- Antonio Sant'Elia (1888–1916), an Italian architect from Como
- Padre Raffaele of Sant'Elia a Pianisi (1816–1901), an Italian Servant of God from Sant'Elia a Pianisi

== Facilities and structures ==
- Basilica di Sant'Elia, a church dating from the 11th century at Castel Sant'Elia
- Stadio Sant'Elia, a football stadium in Cagliari, Italy

== See also ==
- Monte Sant'Elia (disambiguation)
- Elia (disambiguation)
- Saint Elias (disambiguation), Elias derived from Greek for the Italian Elia
- Saint Elijah (disambiguation), Elijah derived from Hebrew for the Italian Elia
