= Ilijić =

Ilijić (Serbian: Илијић) is a Serbo-Croatian language surname with the meaning "son of Ilija".

Ilija is the Croatian version of Elijahu which in Hebrew means “my God is Jahwe”. Some Jews carrying that name were later Christianised.

People with the name include:

- Grgo Ilić, was a Franciscan friar and bishop from Bosnia and Herzegovina
- Alen Ilijić (1975), Serbian composer
- Đuraš Ilijić (1326–62), Serbian nobleman
