= Ilia Lekach =

American chief executive officer

Ilia Lekach is the chief executive officer of Adrenalina. He was the former chief executive officer of Parlux (Nasdaq: "PARL"), a company that makes perfume. Best known brands are Paris Hilton and Guess brands.
