= Ilija (given name) =

Ilija (Cyrillic script: Илија, Serbo-Croatian pronunciation: [ǐlija]) is a South Slavic male given name, cognate of Ilya/Elijah.

It may refer to:

- Ilija (kefalija), Serbian nobleman of the 14th century
- Ilija Aračić, Croatian football player
- Ilija Arnautović, Slovene architect of Serbian origin
- Ilija Bašičević, Serbian painter
- Ilija Batljan, Montenegrin Swedish politician
- Ilija Birčanin, Serbian nobleman
- Ilija Bozoljac, Serbian tennis player
- Ilija Crijević, Dubrovnik poet
- Ilija Čarapić, Serbian politician
- Ilija Dimovski, Macedonian politician
- Ilija Đukić, Serbian diplomat
- Ilija Garašanin, Serbian politician
- Ilija Gregorić, Croatian soldier
- Ilija Grgic, Croatian Australian football player
- Ilija Ivezić, Croatian actor
- Ilija Ivić, Serbian football player
- Ilija Janković, Serbian soldier
- Ilija Katić, Serbian football player
- Ilija Lupulesku, Serbian American table tennis player
- Ilija Lončarević, Croatian football coach
- Ilija Lukić, Serbian football player
- Ilija Milošević, Italian astronomer
- Ilija Mitić, Serbian American football player
- Ilija Monte Radlovic, Montenegrin British soldier and writer
- Ilija Najdoski, Macedonian football player
- Ilija Nestorovski, Macedonian football player
- Ilija Ničić, Serbian sport shooter
- Ilija Okrugić, Croatian writer
- Ilija Panajotović, Serbian film producer and tennis player
- Ilija Pantelić, Serbian football player
- Ilija Pejovski, Macedonian classical musician
- Ilija Perajica, outlaw from Dalmatia
- Ilija Petković, Serbian football player
- Ilija Prodanović, Bosnian football player
- Ilija Radović, Montenegrin football player
- Ilija Ristanić, Bosnian football player
- Ilija Sivonjić, Croatian football player
- Ilija Spasojević, Montenegrin Indonesian footballer
- Ilija Stanić, Bosnian secret agent
- Ilija Stolica, Serbian football player
- Ilija Temelkovski, Macedonian handball coach
- Ilija Trifunović-Birčanin, Serbian soldier
- Ilija Trojanow, Bulgarian writer
- Ilija Zavišić, Serbian football player

== See also ==
- Ilya, given name
- Ilia, given name
- Ilja, given name
- Ilić, surname
- Ilijić, surname
