= Iliya (name) =

Iliya is a name of Bulgarian origin. It may refer to:

- Iliya Bekyarov (1938–2015), Bulgarian footballer
- Iliya Dimitrov (born 1996), Bulgarian footballer
- Iliya Dyakov (born 1963), Bulgarian footballer
- Iliya Dzhamov (born 1998), Bulgarian footballer
- Iliya Gruev (born 1969), Bulgarian footballer
- Iliya Karapetrov (born 1992), Bulgarian footballer
- Iliya Iliev (born 1974), Bulgarian footballer
- Iliya Lazarov (born 1965), Bulgarian politician
- Iliya Milanov (born 1992), Bulgarian footballer
- Iliya Nikolov (born 1986), Bulgarian footballer
- Iliya Shalamanov-Trenkov (born 2002), Australian footballer
- Iliya Velichkov (born 1956), Bulgarian footballer
- Iliya Voynov (born 1964), Bulgarian footballer
- Iliya Yurukov (born 1999), Bulgarian politician

== See also ==
- Ilia (name)
- Ilya
- Iliyas Azmi (1934–2023), Indian politician
