= Vincent Lange =

German volleyball player (born 1974)

Personal information
- Nationality: German
- Born: 15 June 1974 (age 52); Berlin, Germany

Vincent Lange (born 15 June 1974 in Berlin) actor, producer, sports manager and coach, ex volleyball player from Germany, who competed for the Men's National Team in the 2000s. He played as a receiver/spiker and libero.

== Honours ==
- (Beach Volleyball Pro / International Tournaments & Top Rankings 1997 - 2001)
- 2001 European Championship — 9th place
- 2002 FIVB World League — 9th place
- (German Champion 2003 / SCC Berlin)
- (European Cup Champion 2006 / Copra Berni Piacenza)
