= Marko Liefke =

German volleyball player (born 1974)

Personal information
- Nationality: German
- Born: 15 July 1974 (age 52); Schwerin, Mecklenburg-Vorpommern, Germany

Marko Liefke (born 15 July 1974 in Schwerin, Mecklenburg-Vorpommern) is a German volleyball player who played for the men's national team in the 2000s. He played as a wing-spiker, and won the gold medal at the 2001 Summer Universiade.

== Honours ==
- 2001 FIVB World League — 13th place
- 2001 Summer Universiade — 1st place
- 2001 European Championship — 9th place
- 2002 FIVB World League — 9th place
- 2003 FIVB World League — 10th place
