= Krzysztof Wójcik (volleyball) =

Polish volleyball player (born 1960)

Personal information
- Full name: Krzysztof Wójcik
- Born: October 20, 1960 (age 66); Żagań, Poland
- Height: 1.81 m (5 ft 11 1/2 in)
- Weight: 80 kg (180 lb)
- Spike: 325 cm (128 in)
- Block: 318 cm (125 in)

National team
2001	Poland

Krzysztof Wójcik [kʐɨʂtɔf vujt͡sik] (born October 20, 1960, in Żagań, Poland) is a retired Polish volleyball player. He played as receiver and also as a libero at the end of his career. He played for many seasons as a basic player in AZS PWSZ Nysa sports club. He ended his career in 2005/06 season as player of Chemik Bydgoszcz.

After ending his career as a player he soon became coach of men volleyball.

== Achievements ==
- Participant of FIVB World League (2001)
- Fifth place at 2001 Men's European Volleyball Championship
- Third place in Polish Volleyball League (2003)
- First place in Polish Volleyball League with Ivett Jastrzębie Borynia (2004)

== Career ==
=== As a player ===
- AZS PWSZ Nysa (1982/83–1995/96)
- Ivett Jastrzębie Borynia (2000/01)
- Ivett Jastrzębie Borynia (2001/02–2003/04)
- Chemik Bydgoszcz (2004/05–2005/06)

=== As a coach ===
- Joker Piła (2007/08)
- Ósemka Siedlce (2008/09)
- Krispol Września (2009)
