= Ilya Oberyshyn =

Ukrainian insurgent (1921–2007)

- Ілля Оберишин
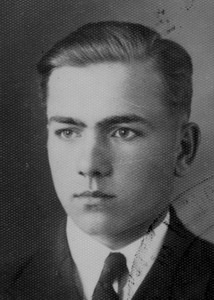
- Oberyshyn in c. the 1940s
- Born: 1921; Potik, Stanisławów Voivodeship, Second Polish Republic
- Died: 11 November 2007 (aged 85–86); Horodnytsia, Ternopil Raion, Ternopil Oblast, Ukraine
- Years active: 1944–1991
- Movement: Organisation of Ukrainian Nationalists

Ilya Stepanovych Oberyshyn (Ukrainian: Ілля Степанович Оберишин; c. 1921 – 11 November 2007) was a Ukrainian soldier who fought against both Nazi Germany and the Soviet Union as a part of the Ukrainian Insurgent Army in the 1940s. He became a fugitive in the Soviet Union as a result of the fighting and went into hiding in 1951. Oberyshyn was not able to get a job, get married, or visit a hospital as a result. He also faced imminent arrest for not having a Soviet passport, which he burned in 1944. It was only after hearing the results of the Ukrainian independence referendum in December 1991 when he came out of hiding and turned himself in to the Ukrainian authorities. He then lived an active political and social life until he died in 2007.

== Biography ==
Oberyshyn was born in 1921 in the village of Potik in the Stanisławów Voivodeship of the Second Polish Republic. His accurate date of birth is unknown.

=== Education ===
Oberyshyn studied in the Rohatyn Gymnasium. At the age of 17, he joined the youth wing of the Organisation of Ukrainian Nationalists, where he was trusted with anti-drugs and anti-smoking campaigning.

With the arrival of the Red Army in 1939, Oberyshyn entered the physics and math department of the University of Lviv. However, he was forced to leave his studies and take up teaching after mass arrests of students began.

=== In the OUN & UIA ===
In 1941, Oberyshyn became a member of the Organisation of Ukrainian Nationalists and received the pseudonym "Stetsko" in honor of one of the organisation’s leaders, Yaroslav Stetsko. During the same year he also went back to studying, although this time he entered the Danylo Halytsky Lviv National Medical University, which was known as the Lviv State Medical Institute at the time. The OUN instructed him to obtain medicine for the resistance movements. In early April 1944, he joined the OUN underground. Soon he was transferred to the Ukrainian Red Cross, an auxiliary structure of the Ukrainian Insurgent Army. After appropriate training, he was appointed a regional leader of the URC. In spring 1947, the medical service was disbanded, after which he became a member of the Security Service (SB) at the Ternopil regional leadership of the OUN.

From September 1947, Oberyshyn was a super-district leader of the OUN and a super-district SB officer in the Zbarazh district. From 1951, he lost contact with the leadership, was forced to act independently and go into hiding from Soviet authorities. He was in an illegal situation for forty years without any Soviet documents and passport. He only came out of hiding on December 3, 1991, after hearing about the results of the Independence Referendum of Ukraine and turning himself in to the authorities.

In an interview in 1997, Oberyshyn said:

"...In 1951, my friends died. I was left alone, without any connections. I went to the emergency meeting points, but no one showed up there either, and everyone was dead. And then I decided to go deep underground. I broke all ties with civilians with whom I had been associated during the liberation struggle. I kept in touch only with those whom I trusted one hundred percent...

...I did not sleep in a bed for forty years. I was constantly wandering from place to place. There is not a village in the region where I could not hide. In summer, in peasant clothes, I would go to the markets of Ternopil, and in winter, wherever I had to, mostly in attics, in straw. After all, you couldn't go to anyone's house because there were sons-in-law, daughters-in-law, grandchildren...

...They could smell that I was alive, and they did not stop looking for me until the last days of the KGB's existence. But as soon as I heard the results of the Ukrainian referendum on December 3, 1991, in the first radio newscast, I realized that it was not their enormous power, but me, alone and exhausted, who had won. My comrades who gave their lives for Ukraine had won..."

=== Later life and death ===
After coming out of hiding, Oberyshyn moved to Ternopil and led an active social and political life. However, this did not last as his health started to decline. He then moved to the village of Horodnytsia, where he died on 11 November 2007.

== Personal life ==
Oberyshyn had a wife named Emilia Turchyn (28 October, 1926 – 9 June, 2018). Meeting Emilia in the late 1940s, Oberyshyn settled in her family’s attic after losing contact with the leadership and the rest of the OUN in 1951. Oberyshyn and Emilia fell in love, secretly married, and had a son, who Emilia named Arkadii.
