= Ilija Batljan =

Swedish politician

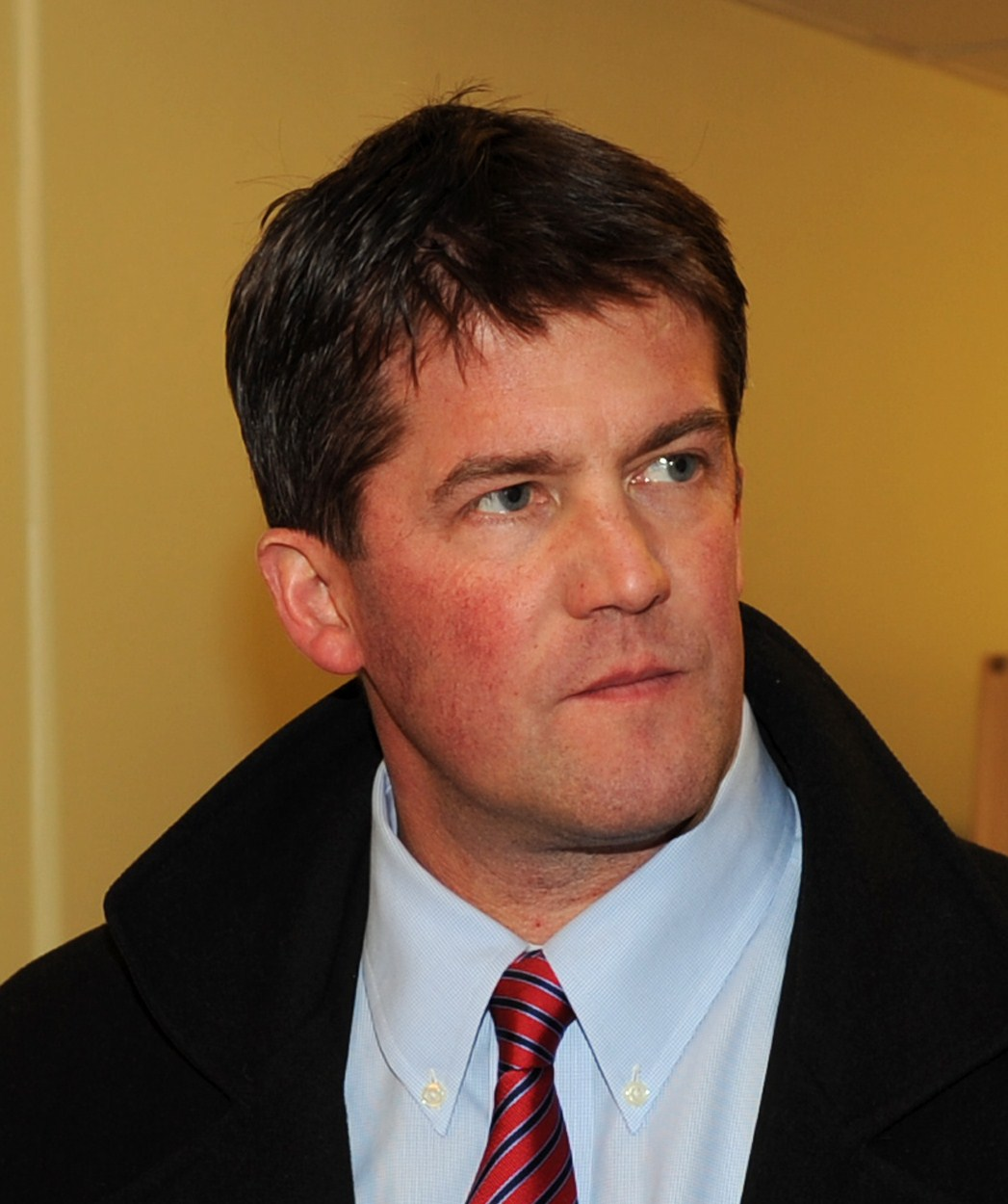

Mayor of Nynäshamn
- In office 2005–2009

Personal details
- Party: Social Democratic
- Occupation: businessman and politician

Ilija Batljan (born 1967) is a former Montenegrin-Swedish Social Democratic politician. Since 2010 Ilija Batljan has been working with real estate in Sweden and in the spring of 2016 he founded the company Samhällsbyggnadsbolaget (SBB), which has since then grown to become one of the bigger real estate companies in Sweden. The firm's shares are listed on the Nasdaq Stockholm exchange and the 'B' class form part of the benchmark OMXS30 index.

He moved to Sweden in 1993 during the breakup of his native Yugoslavia and in 1996 earned a B.A. in economics at Stockholm University, later earning a PhD in 2007. Engaging himself in the Social Democratic Party under then-Prime Minister Göran Persson, he was elected municipal commissioner and Mayor of Nynäshamn in 2005, resigning in 2009 in order to take up his former post as county commissioner. He is generally regarded as a fiscal liberal and a strongman of the social liberal wing of the Social Democratic Party. During the 2010 general election he publicly criticized the party leadership for promising to reinstate wealth and property taxes abolished by the Reinfeldt administration, calling the controversial property tax "perverse". His reformist agenda earned him harsh internal criticism but also made him an expected frontrunner for the party's 2011 leadership election after the party's defeat, but he has publicly proclaimed his will not to run.
