= Elias Tahan =

American photographer (born 1986)

- Born: September 11, 1986 (age 39); Los Angeles, California; United States
- Occupation: Photographer
- Website: http://eliastahan.com

Elias Tahan (born September 11, 1986) is an American photographer currently located in Los Angeles.

Elias Tahan has been featured in publications such as Flaunt, Interview, and Nylon. His celebrity subjects include Jennifer Lopez, Malin Åkerman, Shirley Manson, Solange Knowles, Kristen Bell, Jena Malone, Nicole Richie, Ashley Tisdale, Rachael Leigh Cook, Sara Paxton, Shenae Grimes, Melanie Brown, and Shay Mitchell.
