= Luc Marquet =

French volleyball player (born 1970)

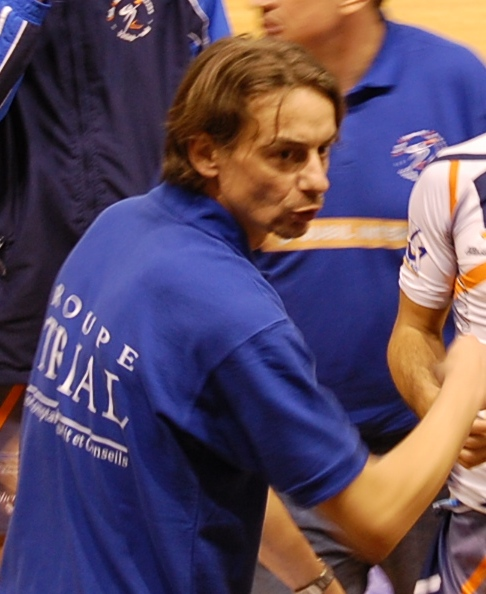

Medal record

Men's Volleyball

Representing France

World Championships
Bronze medal – third place	2002 Argentina	Team

European Championships
Silver medal – second place	2003 Berlin	Team

Luc Marquet (born 15 April 1970 in Lyon, Rhône) is a French volleyball player, who won the silver medal with the Men's National Team at the 2003 European Championships in Berlin, Germany. He earned a total number of 325 caps for the national side. He also competed in the men's tournament at the 1992 Summer Olympics.

== International competitions ==
- 1990 – World League (5th place)
- 1991 – World League (8th place)
- 1991 – European Championship (9th place)
- 1992 – World League (11th place)
- 1992 – Summer Olympics (9th place)
- 1993 – European Championship (9th place)
- 1997 – European Championship (4th place)
- 1999 – World League (7th place)
- 1999 – European Championship (6th place)
- 2000 – World League (7th place)
- 2001 – World League (6th place)
- 2001 – European Championship (7th place)
- 2002 – World League (7th place)
- 2002 – World Championship (bronze medal)
- 2003 – World League (10th place)
- 2003 – European Championship (silver medal)
