= Ilija Ristanić =

Bosnian footballer (born 1986)

Personal information
- Date of birth: 11 February 1986 (age 40)
- Place of birth: Brčko, SFR Yugoslavia
- Position: Midfielder

Senior career*
Years	Team	Apps	(Gls)
2004–2005	BASK	5	(1)
2005–2007	Orašje	43	(1)
2008	Rad	4	(0)
2008–2009	→ Modriča (loan)	19	(0)
2009–2010	Napredak Kruševac	3	(0)
2010	Sloboda Tuzla	4	(0)
2011	Orašje		
2012	Zvijezda Gradačac	20	(0)
2013-2016	Jedinstvo Brčko		
2016-2017	Hajduk Orašje		

International career
2007–2008	Bosnia and Herzegovina U21	5	(0)
- * Club domestic league appearances and goals

Ilija Ristanić (born 11 February 1986) is a Bosnian-Herzegovinian former professional footballer who played as a midfielder.

== Club career ==
Born in Brčko, SR Bosnia and Herzegovina, he started his career in 2004 playing with Belgrade's FK BASK, before moving, in January 2005, to play with HNK Orašje. In January 2008, he was transferred to Serbian First League club FK Rad where he played the rest of the season. In summer 2008, he was loaned to Premier League of Bosnia and Herzegovina club FK Modriča. Between January and June 2010 he played once more in Serbia, this time with FK Napredak Kruševac in the Serbian SuperLiga. In summer 2010 he returned to Bosnia signing with FK Sloboda Tuzla in the Premier League, but in the winter break he moved to his former club HNK Orašje. In the winter break of the 2010–11 season, he joined Bosnian Premier League side NK Zvijezda Gradačac.

== International career ==
Since 2007, he was part of the Bosnia and Herzegovina national under-21 football team.
