= Dirk-Jan van Gendt =

Dutch volleyball player (born 1974)

Jan van Gendt

Personal information
- Nationality: Dutch
- Born: 18 July 1974 (age 52)
- Height: 185 cm (6 ft 1 in)
- Weight: 78 kg (172 lb)
- Spike: 332 cm (131 in)
- Block: 313 cm (123 in)

Volleyball information
- Number: 1

Career
Years	Teams
2002	(Netherlands) Alcom/Capelle (Germany) Moerser Sportclub

National team
2001-2013	Netherlands

Hendrik Theodorus Petrus "Dirk-Jan" van Gendt (born July 18, 1974) is a retired volleyball player from the Netherlands and was part of the Netherlands men's national volleyball team. He represented his native country at the 2004 Summer Olympics in Athens, Greece. There he ended up in ninth place with the Dutch Men's National Team. He also competed at the 2001 Men's European Volleyball Championship, 2002 FIVB Volleyball Men's World Championship in Argentina, 2007 Men's European Volleyball Championship and 2013 FIVB Volleyball World League. He played for the Moerser Sportclub (Germany).

He was born in Boxtel, North Brabant.

== Clubs ==
- (Netherlands) Alcom/Capelle (2002)
- (Germany) Moerser Sportclub
