= Parlux =

Parlux S.p.A.
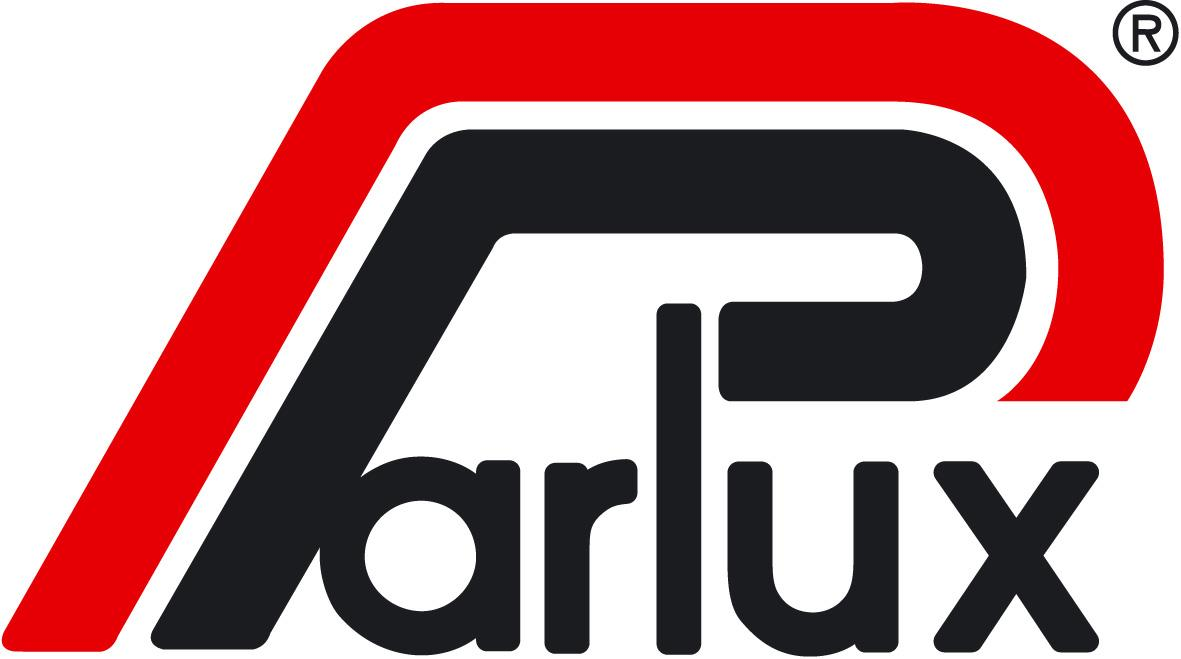
- Company type: Private
- Industry: Appliances, personal care
- Founded: Corsico, Italy, 1977; 49 years ago
- Founder: Paolo Parodi
- Headquarters: Trezzano sul Naviglio, Italy
- Area served: Worldwide
- Products: hair dryers
- Website: http://www.parluxus.com

Parlux is an Italian manufacturer of hair dryers and other related hair care electrical appliances, which sells largely in the commercial side of the hair electrical appliance market, and less so the household market.

== History ==
It was founded in 1977 by Paolo Parodi in Corsico. In 1991 it moved to Trezzano sul Naviglio. From 2000, the appliances were no longer hand-made, but made on an automated assembly line.

== Structure ==
It is situated in the Lombardy region of Italy.

== See also ==
- Babyliss (Conair Corporation of Connecticut)
- List of Italian companies
