= Ilija Dimovski =

Macedonian politician

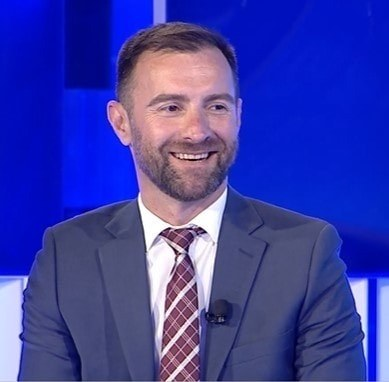
Ilija Dimovski

Ilija Dimovski (Macedonian: Илија Димовски) (born August 10, 1980) is a former member of the Assembly of North Macedonia representing the city Veles from 2006 to 2020. Ilija Dimovski is a former spokesman of VMRO-DPMNE. He also was a member of the Legislative Committee, Deputy-Member of the Committee on Defence and Security, Chairman of the Committee on the Political System and Inter-Ethnic Relations, and Chairman of the Committee on Election and Appointment Issues. Ilija Dimovski is an active writer in the daily newspaper Dnevnik.
