= Ilia Xhokaxhi =

Albanian painter

- Born: August 28, 1948; Tirana, Albania
- Died: 2007 (aged 58–59)

Ilia Xhokaxhi (August 28, 1948 in Tirana – 2007) was an Albanian painter, scenographer, and costume designer. He served as the art director for a number of films. As a painter, he exhibited in numerous galleries both in Albania and abroad.

== Selected filmography ==
- 1980: Pas vdekjes
- 1983: Nje emer midis njerezve
- 1984: Lundrimi i pare
- 1985: I paftuarit
- 1986: Rrethimi i vogel
- 1987: Eja!
- 1987: Vrasje ne gjueti
- 1988: Bregu i ashper
- 1992: Vdekja e burrit
- 1994: Nekrologji
- 1998: Dasma e Sakos
- 1998: Nata
- 1999: Funeral Business
- 2003: Lule të kuqe, lule të zeza
