= Marcin Nowak (volleyball) =

Polish volleyball player (born 1975)

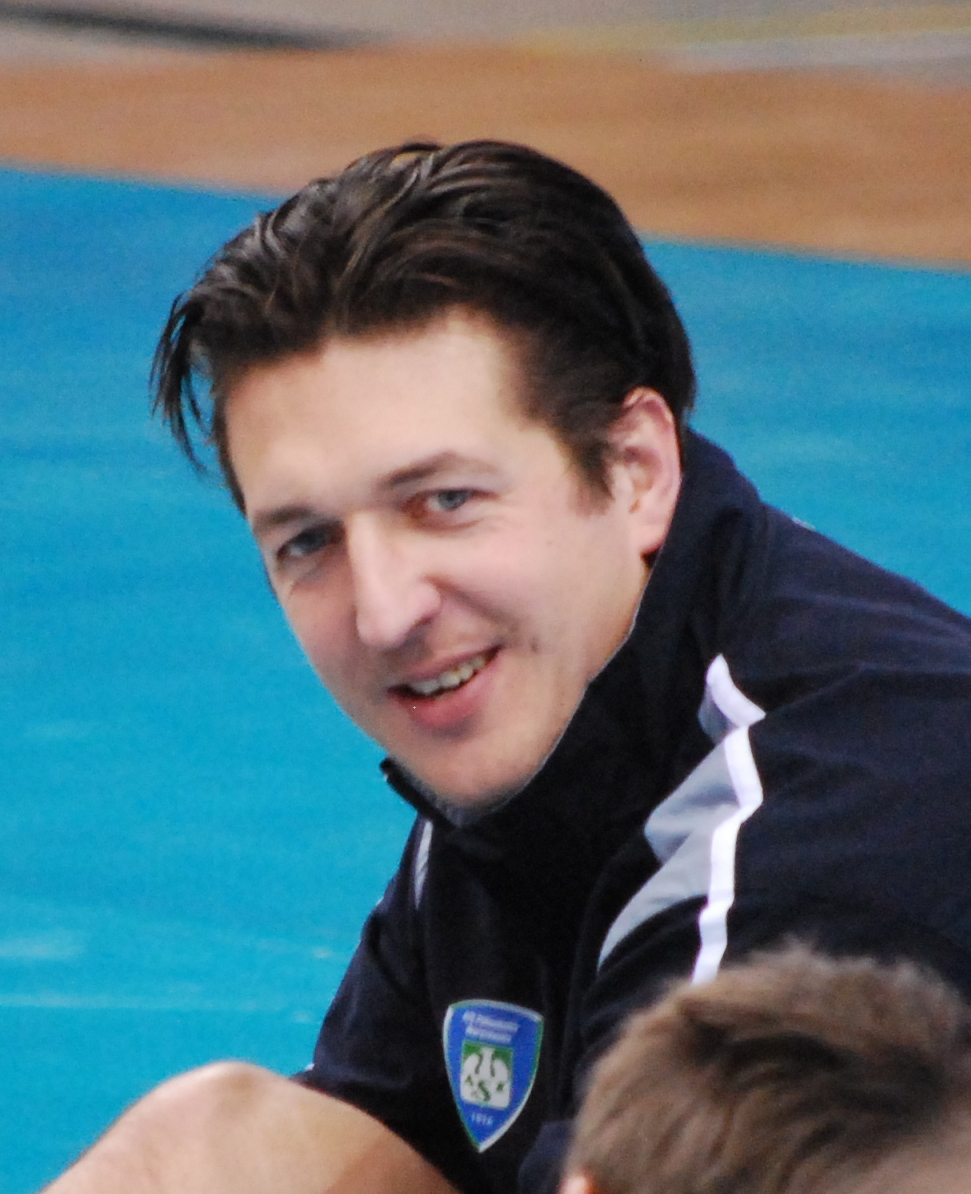
- Marcin Nowak in 2011

Personal information
- Nationality: Polish
- Born: 17 October 1975 (age 49); Częstochowa, Poland

Sport
- Sport: Volleyball

Marcin Nowak (born 17 October 1975) is a Polish volleyball player. He competed in the men's tournament at the 1996 Summer Olympics.
