= Jeroen Trommel =

Dutch volleyball player (born 1980)

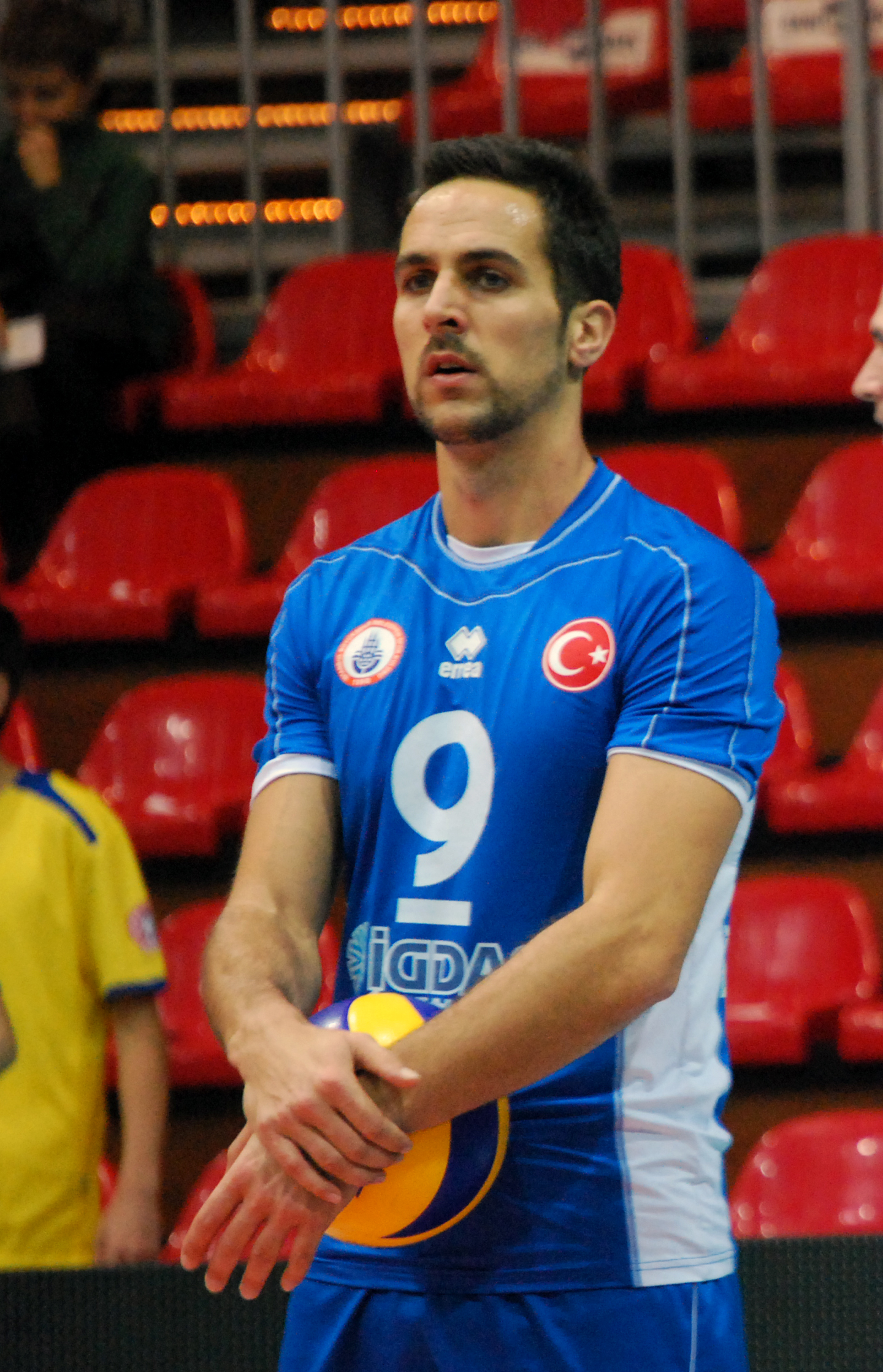

Personal information
- Full name: Jeroen Paul Trommel
- Nationality: Dutch
- Born: August 1, 1981 (age 45); Apeldoorn, Netherlands
- Height: 1.94 m (6 ft 4 in)
- Weight: 93 kg (205 lb)
- Spike: 340 cm (130 in)
- Block: 310 cm (120 in)

Volleyball information
- Position: Outside hitter
- Number: 4

Career
Years	Teams
1996–2002; 2002–2005; 2005–2006; 2006–2008; 2008–2010; 2010–2011; 2011–2013; 2013–2014; 2014–2015	VCN Capelle; Omniworld Almere; Tourcoing Lille VB; AS Cannes VB; İstanbul Belediyesi; VfB Friedrichshafen; İstanbul Belediyesi; Paris Volley; MKS Cuprum Lubin

National team
2001–	Netherlands
- Last updated: 21 February 2017

Jeroen Paul Trommel (born 1 August 1980) is a former Dutch volleyball player, a member of Netherlands men's national volleyball team, a participant of the 2004 Olympic Games, 2009 Turkish Champion, 2011 German Champion.

== Career ==
=== Clubs ===
In season 2013/2014 won CEV Cup with his French team Paris Volley after match with Russian club Guberniya Nizhniy Novgorod. In 2014 moved to Polish club MKS Cuprum Lubin.

He ended up career in 2015.

== Sporting achievements ==
=== CEV Cup ===
- 2013/2014 - with Paris Volley

=== National championship ===
- 2002/2003 Dutch SuperCup2002, with Omniworld Almere
- 2002/2003 Dutch Cup, with Omniworld Almere
- 2003/2004 Dutch SuperCup2003, with Omniworld Almere
- 2003/2004 Dutch Cup, with Omniworld Almere
- 2004/2005 Dutch SuperCup2004, with Omniworld Almere
- 2006/2007 French Cup, with AS Cannes VB
- 2008/2009 Turkish Championship, with İstanbul Belediyesi
- 2010/2011 German Championship, with VfB Friedrichshafen
- 2013/2014 French Championship, with Paris Volley
