= Barelić =

Barelić Барелић (Serbian)
- Village (Selo)
- Location within Serbia
- Coordinates: 42°27′50″N 22°02′43″E
- Country: Serbia
- District: Pčinja District
- Municipality: Vranje

Population (2002)
  - Total: 161
- Time zone: UTC+1 (CET)
  - Summer (DST): UTC+2 (CEST)
- Website: http://www.Vranje-Online.com

Barelić is a village in the municipality of Vranje, Serbia. According to the 2002 census, the village has a population of 161 people.

The village includes a hamlet called Sveti Ilija, which is the location of a post office with post code 17508.
