= Michael Mayer (volleyball) =

German volleyball player (born 1980)

Michael Mayer (born 14 February 1980 in Sulzbach-Rosenberg, Bavaria) is a volleyball player from Germany, who played for the Men's National Team in the 2000s (decade). He played as a wing-spiker.

== Honours ==
- 2001 FIVB World League — 13th place
- 2001 European Championship — 9th place
- 2002 FIVB World League — 9th place
- 2003 FIVB World League — 10th place
