= Ilja Wiederschein =

German volleyball player (born 1977)

Personal information
- Nationality: German
- Born: 5 April 1977 (age 49); Berlin, Germany

Ilja Wiederschein (born 5 April 1977 in Berlin) is a German former volleyball player who played for the Men's National Team in the 2000s. He played as a setter and is nicknamed "Ilse".

== Honours ==
- 2001 FIVB World League — 13th place
- 2001 European Championship — 9th place
- 2002 FIVB World League — 9th place
- 2003 FIVB World League — 10th place
- 2003 European Championship — 7th place
