= Ilia Szrajbman =

Polish swimmer (1907–1943)

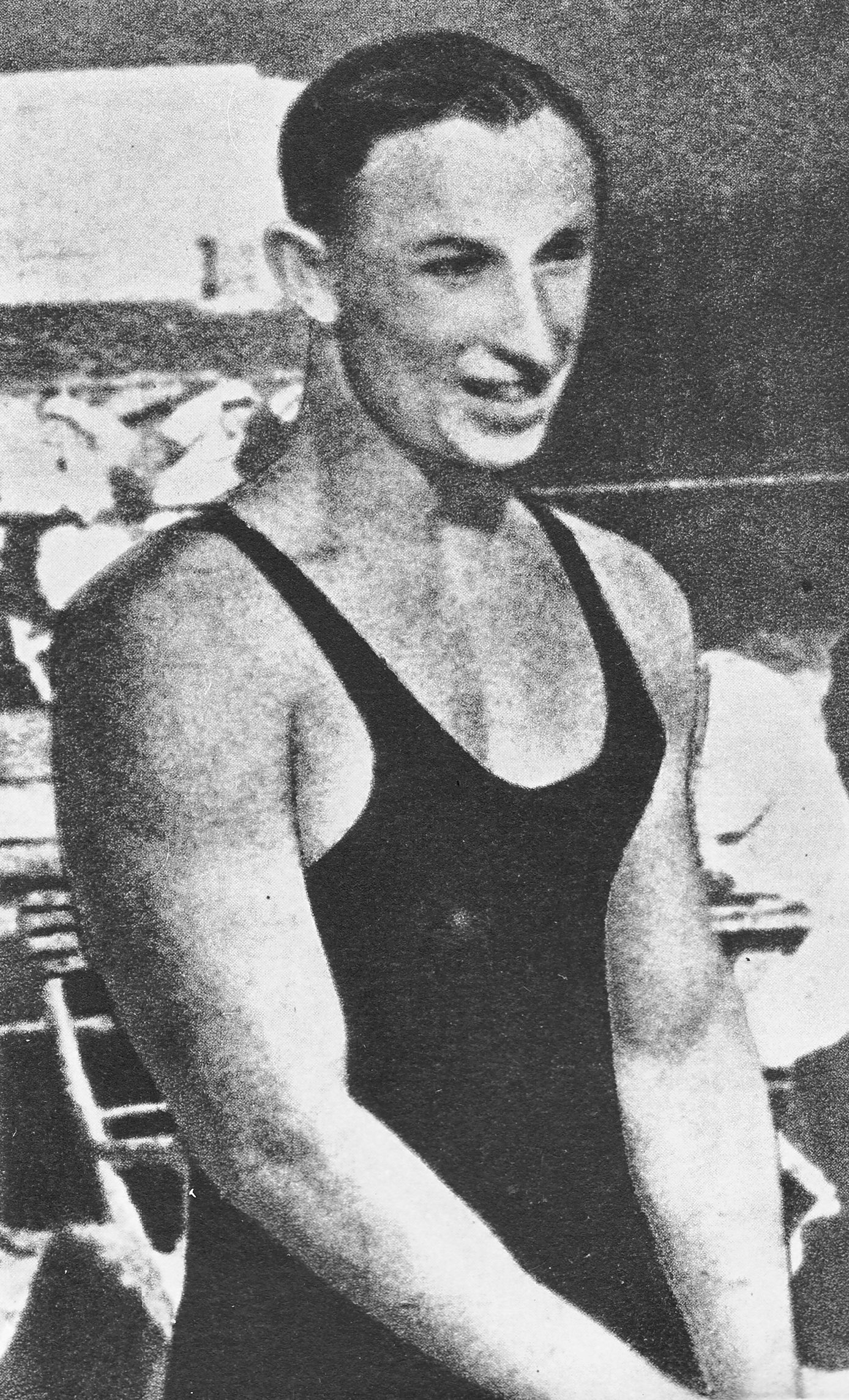
- Ilia Szrajbman

Personal information
- Born: Lejzor Ilja Szrajbman; April 25, 1907 Warsaw, Poland
- Died: 1943 (aged 35–36) Majdanek concentration camp, Poland

Sport
- Country: Poland
- Sport: Swimming
- Event: freestyle
- Club: Jewish Academic Sports Association and Legia

Achievements and titles
- National finals: Polish 400 m freestyle champion (1935); Polish 4×200 m relay freestyle champion (1938)

Lejzor Ilia (also "Ilja") Szrajbman (April 25, 1907 – 1943) was a Jewish Polish Olympic freestyle swimmer. In 1935, he was the Polish 400 m freestyle champion. He competed in the 1935 Maccabiah Games in Mandatory Palestine, and for Poland at the 1936 Summer Olympics in Berlin, Germany. In 1938, he won a gold medal in the Polish 4×200 m relay freestyle championship. Szrajbman was murdered in 1943 in the Majdanek concentration camp.

== Biography ==
Szrajbman was born in Warsaw, Poland. His parents were Lejzor and Masha. He attended Waclaw Szwedkowski Boys Junior High School in Siedlce, Poland. He served as an officer in the Polish 9th Light Artillery Regiment.

He was a Jewish Academic Sports Association and Legia swimmer. In 1935, Szrajbman won the Polish 400m freestyle championship.

Szrajbman was Jewish, and competed in the 1935 Maccabiah Games in Mandatory Palestine.

He competed for Poland at the 1936 Summer Olympics in the men's 4 × 200 metres freestyle relay in Berlin, Germany.

In 1938, Szrajbman won a gold medal in the Polish 4×200 m relay freestyle championship.

In August 1939, Szrajbman was competing in the 1939 International University Games in Monte Carlo, but left the competition and went to Poland to fight the Germans with the Polish 30th Kani Rifle Regiment upon the outbreak of the September 1939 Invasion of Poland. He later fought in the 1943 Warsaw Ghetto Uprising.

Szrajbman was murdered in 1943 in the Majdanek concentration camp.

== See also ==
- List of select Jewish swimmers
