= Elías Ahúja y Andría =

Spanish philanthropist, politician, businessman and academic

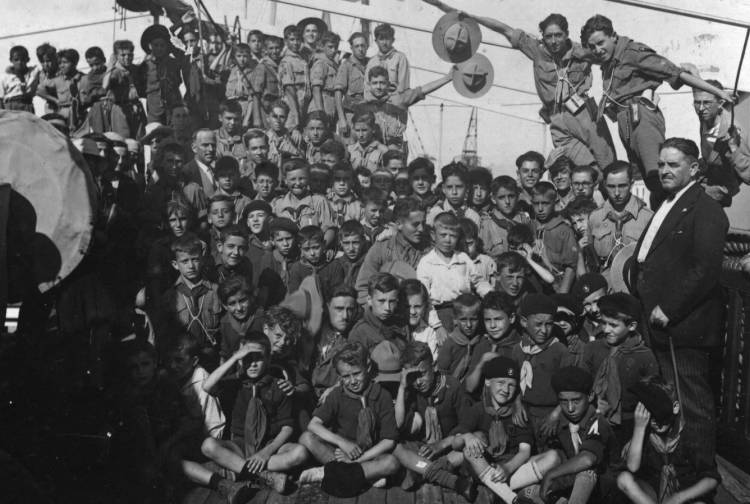
Exploradores de España. Elias Ahuja on the left in the third row, and Luis del Rosal Caro on the right

Elías Ahúja y Andría (January 8, 1863 – July 20, 1951) was a Spanish philanthropist, politician, businessman and academic.

== Life ==
He was born in Cádiz on January 8, 1863. He studied commerce at the Technical Institute of Boston. In 1903, he moved to the Republic of Chile and became Vice-president and later Director of the "Dupont Nitrate Company". In 1922, he returned to Spain and founded the "Elías Ahúja Charity", associated with the Good Samaritans. Interested in culture, he founded several sports, military, religious and educative institutions. He constructed hospitals, clinics, dining halls, schools, quarters, and city council buildings, provided the poor with food, helped widows and orphans, and worked to improve conditions in jails and sanitoriums.

He did much work to assist the Institución Exploradores de España (Scouts) in Puerto Santa Maria, and his work favored other cities such as Seville, Cádiz, Paterna de Rivera, Espera and Villaluenga del Rosario among others too. He was a candidate in the last elections of the Monarchy and also an academic of the Real Hispano Americana y Bellas Artes de Cádiz.

He was honorary president of the Red Cross in Cádiz and Seville and was awarded state decorations for his philanthropy, such as the Military Service Cross, the Gold Medal of the Red Cross, the Cross of the Civilian Order, and the Gold Medal of the Scouts, etc. However, he was later accused of misusing funds and was forced to leave Spain in 1937 through Gibraltar. He died on July 20, 1951 in New York City.

His name is honored in Puerto Santa Maria, where a place and house are dedicated to him, and a council plaque honors him. One of the campuses of the City University of Madrid takes his name.
