= Elia =

Elia is a name which may be a variant of the names Elias, Elijah, Eli or Eliahu, and may refer to:

== People ==
=== Given name ===
- Elia Abu Madi, (1890–1957), Lebanese poet
- Elia Barceló (born 1957), Spanish writer
- Elia Goode Byington (1858–1936), American journalist
- Elia Canales (born 2001), Spanish archer
- Elia Cmíral (born 1950), Czech film composer
- Elia Dalla Costa (1872–1961), Italian cardinal and Archbishop of Florence
- Elia del Medigo (1458–1493), Greek rabbi
- Elia Favilli (born 1989), Italian cyclist
- Elia Frosio (1913–2005), Italian cyclist
- Elia Galera (born 1973), Spanish actress
- Elia Kaiyamo (born 1951), Namibian politician
- Elia Kazan (1909–2003), American director and producer
- Elia Legati (born 1986), Italian football player
- Elia Levita (1469–1549), German Hebrew scholar
- Elia Liut (1894–1952), Italian aviator
- Elia Luini (born 1979), Italian rower
- Elia Millosevich (1848–1919), Italian astronomer
- Elia W. Peattie (1862–1935), American journalist
- Elia Peraizza (died 1685), Venetian military leader
- Elia Ravelomanantsoa (born 1960), Malagasy politician
- Elia Rigotto (born 1982), Italian cyclist
- Elia Soriano (born 1989), German football player
- Elia Suleiman (born 1960), Palestinian director
- Elia Viviani (born 1989), Italian cyclist
- Elia Zenghelis (born 1937), Greek architect

=== Surname ===
- Alessandro Elia (born 1990), Italian footballer
- Angelo Elia (born 1957), Swiss footballer
- Antonella Elia (born 1963), Italian actress
- Bruce Elia (born 1953), American football player
- Eljero Elia (born 1987), Dutch footballer
- Jon Elia (1931–2002), Pakistani poet
- Lee Elia (1937–2025), American baseball player and coach
- Leopoldo Elia (1925–2008), Italian politician
- Meschak Elia (born 1997), Congolese footballer
- Sapphire Elia (born 1987), British actress

=== Pen name ===
- Elia, a pen name of Charles Lamb (1775–1834), English essayist, poet and antiquarian

== Places ==
- Elia, Kyrenia, Cyprus, a village
- Elia, Nicosia, Cyprus, a village
- Elia, Mykonos, Greece
- Elia (Nikiti), Sithonia, Greece, a village
- Elia Island, a river island in Guinea-Bissau
- Elia, a historical and alternative name for the Jane and Finch neighbourhood of Toronto, Canada

== Other uses ==
- Elia or Elijah, a biblical prophet
- European League of Institutes of the Arts (ELIA), an organization of art schools
- Elia (sculpture), a prominent public artwork in Denmark
- Elia System Operator, an electric power transmission system operator of Belgium
- Olive Tree (Greece) (Greek: Ελιά, Elia), a political alliance
- European Language Industry Association (ELIA); see language industry
- Elia (gastropod), a genus of gastropods in the family Clausiliidae

== See also ==
- Sant'Elia (disambiguation)
- Monte Sant'Elia (disambiguation)
- Eli (name)
- Elie (disambiguation)
- Elias (disambiguation)
- Elis or Ilia, a historic region of the Peloponnese peninsula of Greece
- Essays of Elia, a collection of essays written by Charles Lamb
- Ilia (disambiguation)
- Ilya (disambiguation)
