= St. Elijah's Church =

St. Elijah's Church may refer to:

- St. Elijah's Church, Buhal, Albania
- St. Elijah's Monastery Church, Jorgucat, Albania
- St. Elijah's Church, Stegopull, Albania
- St. Elijah Church, Voskopojë, Albania
- Saint Elijah the Prophet Serbian Orthodox Church, Coober Pedy, Australia
- Church of Saint Elias, Glamoč, Bosnia and Herzegovina
- Church of St Elijah, Boboshevo, Bulgaria
- Profitis Ilias Greek Orthodox Church, Endeavour, Saskatchewan, Canada
- St. Ilija Macedonian Orthodox Church, Mississauga, Canada
- St. Elias Antiochian Orthodox Cathedral, Ottawa, Canada
- Church of St. Elijah, Novi Jankovci, Croatia
- Elijah's Church, Vesterbros Troy, Vesterbro, Copenhagen, Denmark
- Church of Prophet Elijah, Thessaloniki, Greece
- Chapel of the Prophet Elias, Mount Olympus, Greece
- St. Elijah Orthodox Syrian Church, Koduvila, Kerala, India
- St. Elias Orthodox Church, Budhanoor, Kerala, India
- St. Elijah Cathedral, Haifa, Israel
- Temple of Elijah the Prophet, Kazakhstan
- Church of St. Elijah, Podujevë, Kosovo
- Church of Saint Elijah, Vushtrri, Kosovo
- Cathedral of Saint Elias and Saint Gregory the Illuminator, Beirut, Lebanon
- St. Elijah Church, Timișoara, Romania
- St. Elijah–Gorgani Church, Bucharest, Romania
- St. Elijah–Rahova Church, Bucharest, Romania
- St. Elijah–Colței Inn Church, Bucharest, Romania
- Church of Elijah the Prophet (Belozersk), Russia
- Church of the Holy Prophet Elijah, Smolinskoye, Sverdlovsk, Russia
- Church of St. Elijah, Ilinci, Serbia
- Cathedral of Saint Elijah, Aleppo, Syria
- Cathedral of Elijah the Prophet, Aleppo, Syria
- Mar Elias Church, Damascus, Syria
- St. Elijah Church, Chernihiv, Ukraine
- St. Elijah Church, Subotiv, Ukraine
- St. Elias Antiochian Orthodox Church (La Crosse, Wisconsin), United States

== See also ==
- Saint Elijah (disambiguation)
- Saint Elias (disambiguation)
- Elijah (disambiguation)
- Elias (disambiguation)
- Monastery of Saint Elijah, Mosul, Iraq
