= Elias I =

Elias I or Eliya I may refer to:

- Elias I of Jerusalem, Patriarch in 494–516
- Elias I of Antioch, Syriac Orthodox Patriarch of Antioch in 709–723
- Elias I of Périgord (919–979)
- Patriarch Elias I of Alexandria, Greek Patriarch of Alexandria in 963–1000
- Elias I of Seleucia-Ctesiphon, Patriarch of the Church of the East in 1028–1049
- Elias I, Count of Maine (died in 1110)
- Elias Peter Hoayek, Maronite Patriarch in 1898–1931

== See also ==
- Elias (disambiguation)
- Elijah (disambiguation)
