= Elias III =

Elias III or Eliya III may refer to:

- Elias III of Jerusalem, Patriarch of Jerusalem from about 879 to 907
- Elias III of Périgord (1055–1104)
- Ignatius Elias III, Syriac Orthodox Patriarch of Antioch in 1917–1932
- Elias III of Seleucia-Ctesiphon, Patriarch of the Church of the East in 1176-1190

== See also ==
- Elias (disambiguation)
- Elijah (disambiguation)
