= Elias II =

Elias II or Eliya II may refer to:

- Elias II of Jerusalem, Patriarch of Jerusalem (770–797)
- Elias II of Périgord (996–1031)
- Elias II, Count of Maine (died in 1151)
- Elias II of Alexandria, Greek Patriarch of Alexandria in 1171–1175
- Elias II of Seleucia-Ctesiphon, Patriarch of the Church of the East in 1111–1132
- Ilia II known also as Elijah II (1933–2026), Patriarch of Georgia in 1977–2026

== See also ==
- Elias (disambiguation)
- Elijah (disambiguation)
