= Saint Elijah (disambiguation) =

Saint Elijah refers to the prophet Elijah

St Elijah or variant, may refer to:

- St. Elijah's Church (disambiguation)
- Mount St Elijah, a massif in Israel
- Monastery of Saint Elijah, Nineveh, Iraq

== See also ==
- Saint Elias (disambiguation) (Latin: Saint Elijah)
- Elijah (disambiguation)
