= Ilias =

Ilias may refer to:

- the Iliad, an ancient Greek epic poem sometimes romanized as Ilias
- Ilias (name), a list of people with the given name
- Leo Ilias, a character in the manga Saint Seiya: The Lost Canvas
- ILIAS, a web-based learning management system
- 6604 Ilias, an asteroid

== See also ==
- Profitis Ilias (disambiguation)
- Agios Ilias (disambiguation)
- Ilijaš, a town and municipality in Bosnia and Herzegovina
- Ilyas (disambiguation)
- Elias
- Illas, a municipality in Spain
- Ilya (disambiguation)
