= Mar Elias =

Mar Elias (Aramaic 'Saint Elias' or 'Lord Elias') may refer to:

- Elijah (alternate spelling of Elias), a prophet of the Hebrew Bible or Old Testament and the Qur'an
- Mar Elias Educational Institutions, a set of Educational Institutes in Ibillin, Israel
- Mar Elias Monastery, a Greek Orthodox Monastery between Jerusalem and Bethlehem
- Mar Elias, a street in Beirut
- Mar Elias refugee camp, a Palestinian refugee camp in Lebanon, near Beirut
- Dair Mar Elia, Saint Elias Monastery in Iraq
- Patriarch Elias of Antioch, Syriac Orthodox Patriarch Elias I, 709–723 CE, known as Mar Elias
- Tell Mar Elias, an archaeological site near Ajlun, Jordan
- Mar Elias and Mar Elias el Tiffeh, archaeological sites in the Sands of Beirut
- Mar Elias Church attack, a terrorist attack against a Greek Orthodox church in Damascus in 2025

== See also ==
- Saint Elias (disambiguation)
- Mara Liasson
