= Elijah (disambiguation) =

Elijah was a prophet in Israel in the 9th century BCE.

Elijah or variant, may also refer to:

== Arts and entertainment ==
- Elijah (Lorenzetto), a 16th-century sculpture by Lorenzetto
- Elijah (oratorio), an 1846 composition by Felix Mendelssohn
- "Elijah", a 1978 song by Head East from Head East
- "Elijah", a 2019 song by Blood Red Shoes from Get Tragic
- Elijah (2007 film), Canadian television film
- Elijah (2024 film), American short film
- "Elijah" (High Maintenance), a 2013 television episode

== People ==
- Elijah (given name), a list of people and fictional characters
- Elijah in Islam, the prophet as he is interpreted in Islam

=== Surnamed ===
- Samuel Elijah (born 1969), Nigerian footballer
- Soffiyah Elijah, American lawyer, author, and social justice activist
- Zebulon Elijah (1836/1838–1910), American formerly enslaved person who became a Florida politician

== Places ==
- Elijah, Missouri, US, an unincorporated community
- Mount Elijah, a geographic feature within Oregon Caves National Monument and Preserve
- Elijahs Creek, Boone County, Kentucky, USA; a creek

=== Facilities and structures ===
- Elijah's Church, Vesterbros Troy, Vesterbro, Copenhagen, Denmark
- Temple of Elijah the Prophet, Zharkent, Almaty, Kazakhstan

== Other uses ==
- Elijah Interfaith Institute

== See also ==
- Hajile or "Reverse Elijah", a UK WW2 special project
- Cave of Elijah, Mt. Carmel, Israel
- St. Elijah's Church (disambiguation)
- Saint Elijah (disambiguation)
- Elias (disambiguation), Elias is the Latinate form of Elijah
