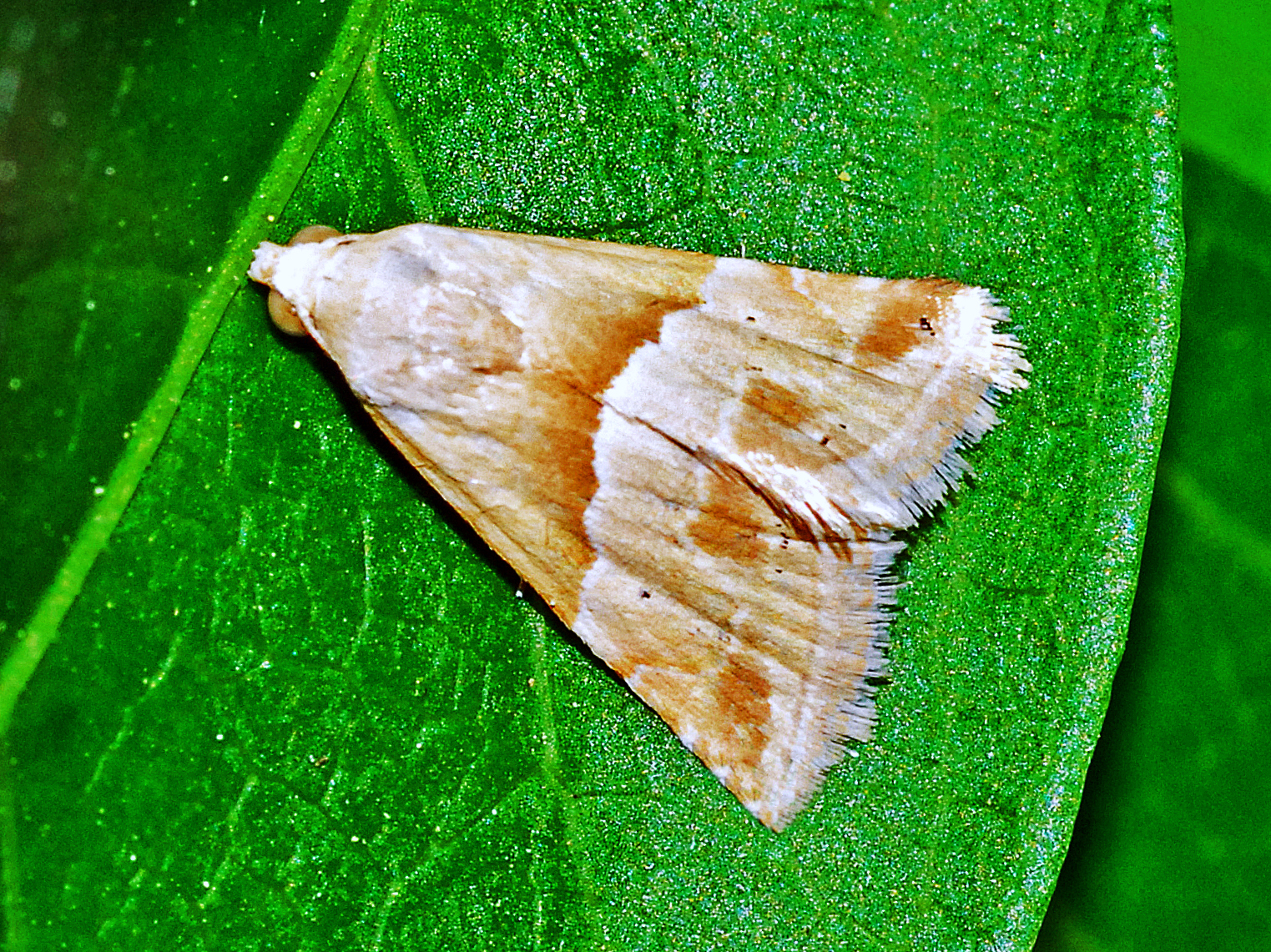

Scientific classification
- Kingdom: Animalia
- Phylum: Arthropoda
- Clade: Pancrustacea
- Class: Insecta
- Order: Lepidoptera
- Superfamily: Noctuoidea
- Family: Erebidae
- Genus: Eublemma
- Species: E. parva

Binomial name
- Eublemma parva (Hübner, 1808)

Synonyms
- Eublemma nymphodora Meyrick, 1902; Micra chalybea Swinhoe, 1884; Micra parva var. rubefacta Mabille, 1869; Noctua parva Hübner, [1808]; Porphyrinia lactescens Turati, 1924; Thalpochares parvula Moore, 1881

= Eublemma parva =

Small marbled

Species of moth

Eublemma parva, the small marbled, is a moth of the family Erebidae. The species was first described by Jacob Hübner in 1808.

== Etymology ==
The Latin name parva means "the little one".

== Distribution and habitat ==
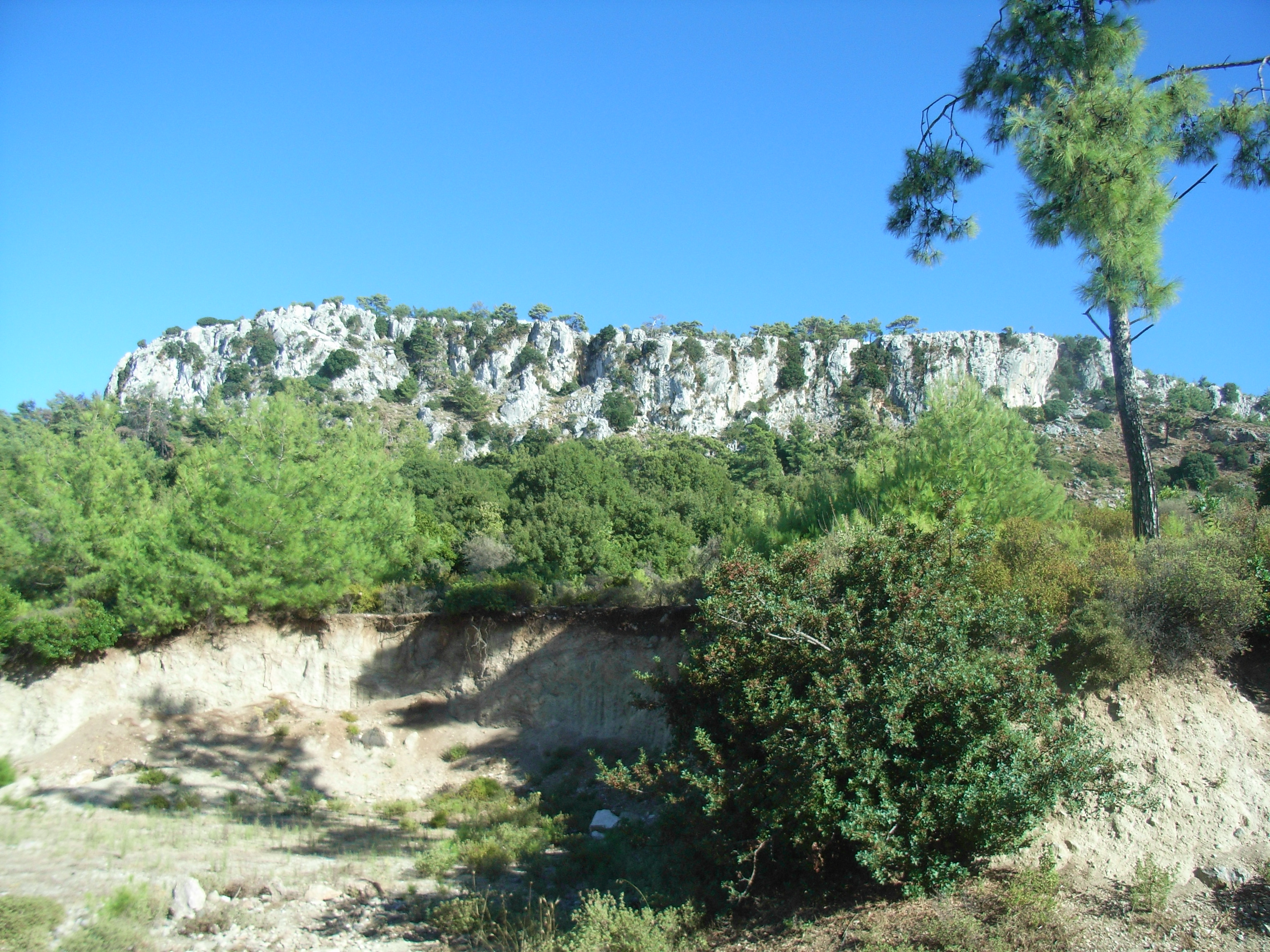
Habitat in Profitis Ilias, Rhodes, Greece

This species can be found from North Africa (Algeria, Egypt, Libya, Mauritania, Morocco, southern Tunisia), Central and southern Africa (Eswatini Niger, South Africa, Sudan), and southern Europe to Central Asia. Also the Middle East, Turkey, Caucasus, Transcaucasia, Iraq, Iran, Afghanistan, Pakistan and north-west India. It is a migratory species and can be found north of the Alps. These moths mainly inhabit hot and semi-arid areas of all kinds, including nutrient-poor grasslands, rocky slopes and scrubland.

== Technical description and variation ==
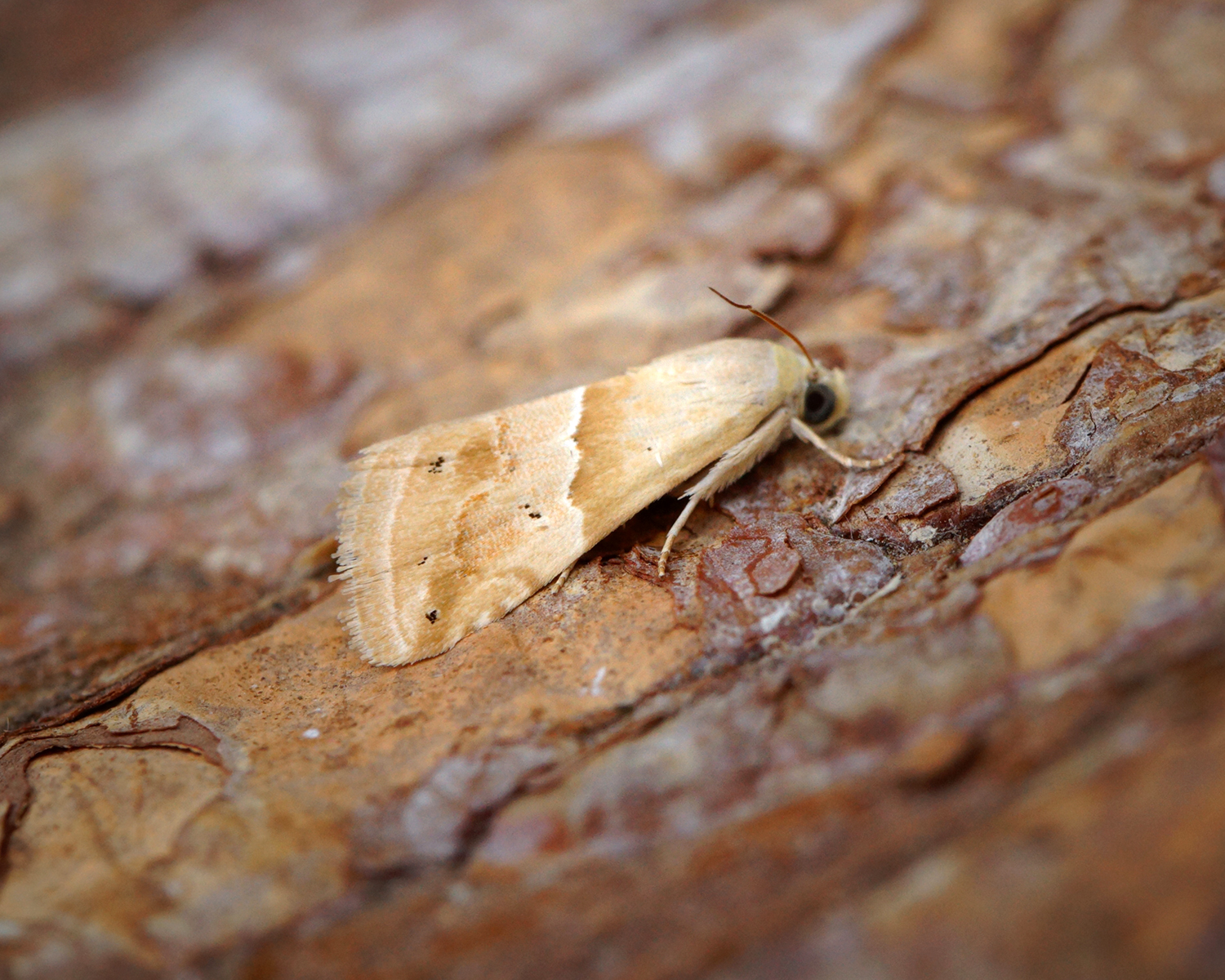
Side view

The wingspan can reach 14–18 millimetres (0.55–0.71 in) Forewings are pale ochreous, tinged with yellowish, with a pale reddish median band bordered with white, preceded by brown suffusion. A brown tint is present near the apex. A black dot is visible on the discocellular. The submarginal line is pale and hardly marked and contains a black speck below the apex. The hind wings are brownish gray, whiter towards the base.

The ab. rubefacta Mab, from Corsica and Sicily, shows the basal and terminal areas of the forewing, dark brown tinged with rose; the brown median shade and its pale edging very prominent; the hindwing dark; — in typical specimens the space between median and outer lines remains pale ochreous or brownish; in several examples, especially females, from Morocco, Spain, and Syria this space is finely dusted with pearl grey, = ab. griseata ab. nov.[Warren].

This species is rather similar to the purple marbled (Eublemma ostrina) and the scarce marbled (Eublemma minutata).

== Biology ==
This species occurs in several generations each year. Adults are on wing from March to November. The larvae are light brown with reddish shades and longitudinal white lines. The hairs are rather sparse. The head and the prothoracic shield are brown. They can be found from July to September. They mainly feed on common Asteraceae such as common fleabane (Pulicaria dysenterica), ploughman's-spikenard (Inula conyzae), Limbarda crithmoides, Inula viscosa, Centaurea calcitrapa, Helichrysum and Gnaphalium species. Pupation usually occurs within these flowers.
