= Transfiguration Cathedral (Belozersk) =

Orthodox temple in Belozersk, Russia

Coordinates: 60.031609°N 37.784499°E

Transfiguration Cathedral (Belozersk) Спасо-Преображенский Cобо́р Spaso-Preobrazhensky Sobor
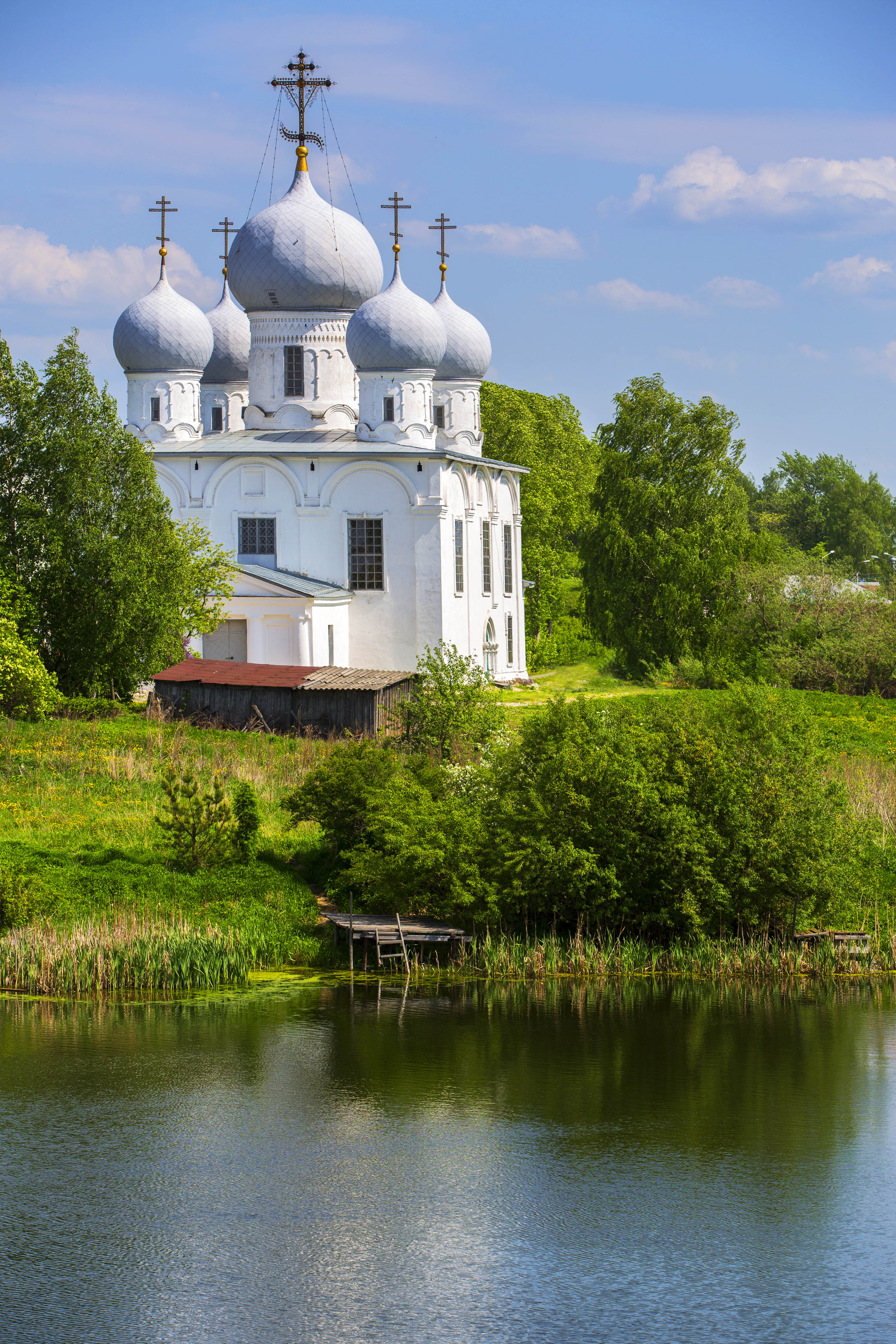

Religion
- Affiliation: State Russian Museum; Russian Orthodox
- Status: Museum

Location
- Location: Belozersk, Russia
- Interactive map of Transfiguration Cathedral (Belozersk); Спасо-Преображенский Cобо́р; Spaso-Preobrazhensky Sobor

Architecture
- Completed: 1668

Transfiguration Cathedral is Russian Orthodox church located inside the earthen rampart of the Belozersk' Kremlin in Vologda region. It is a three-apse four-pillar temple with five onion-like domes, and is the dominant building of Kremlin.

Its construction had started in 1668 and was fully completed only by the end of the 1670s. The architecture of the temple was designed in archaic forms as it was typical for the second half of the XVII-th century. However, the facades' decoration was developed in the style typical for more early period – those of local architecture of the XVI-th century. Currently the Transfiguration Cathedral functions as a museum and is managed by the Belozersky Local Museum. The museum is open to the public from May to October.

An object of cultural heritage of Russia of federal significance.

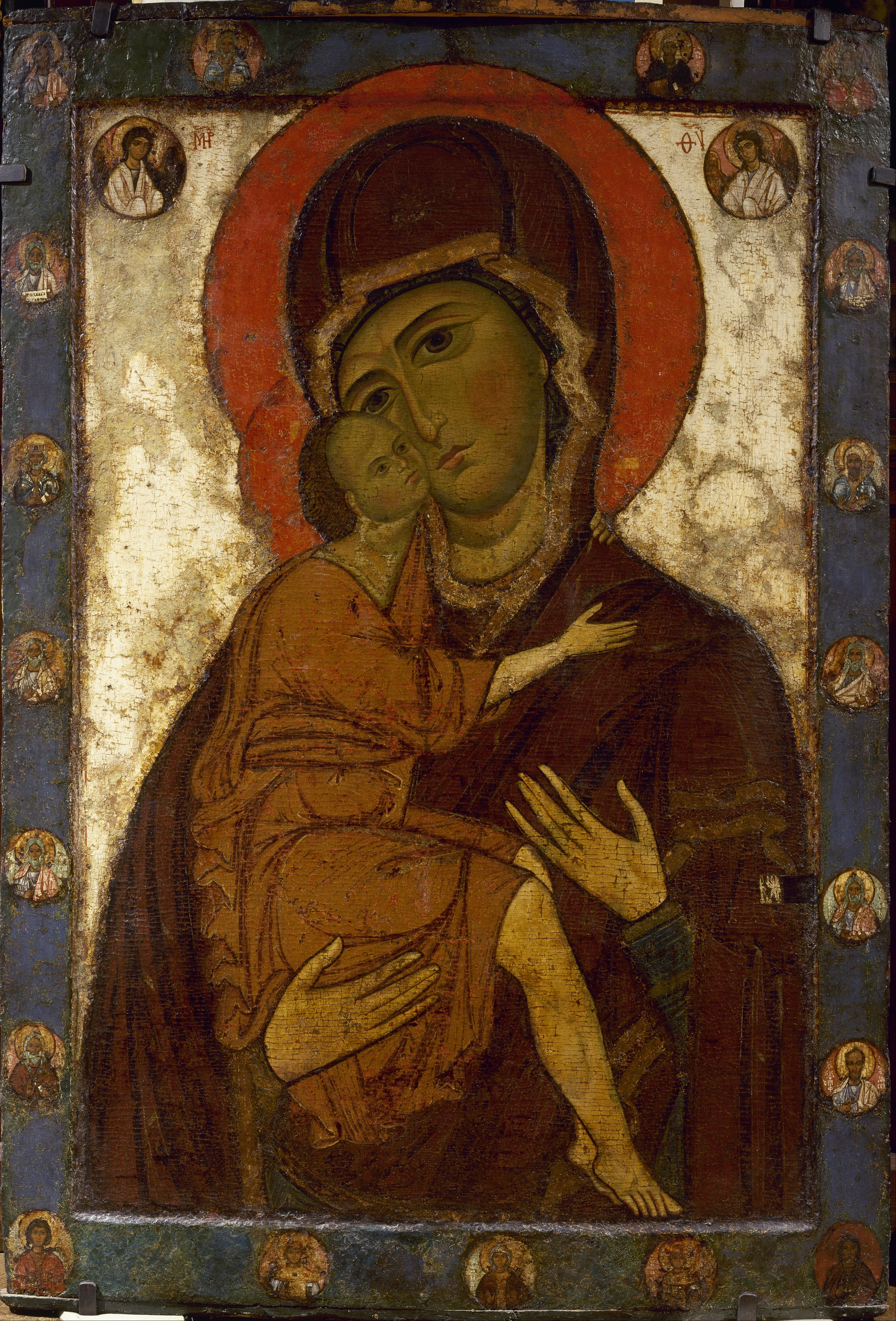
The Mother of God of Tenderness of the White Lake
