= Agios Ilias =

Agios Ilias (Saint Elias) may refer to the following places in Greece and Cyprus:

- Agios Ilias, Amaliada, a village in the municipality of Amaliada, northern Elis
- Agios Ilias, Cyprus, a village in Famagusta District, Cyprus
- Agios Ilias, Lefkada, a village on the island of Lefkada
- Agios Ilias, Pyrgos, a village in the municipality of Pyrgos, central Elis
- Agios Ilias, Zacharo, a village in the municipality of Zacharo, southern Elis
- Agios Ilias, a subdivision of Aitoliko

== See also ==
- Ilias (disambiguation)
- Saint Elias (disambiguation)
