= Profitis Ilias =

Profitis Ilias (lit. Prophet Elijah) may refer to:

== Churches ==
- Profitis Ilias Greek Orthodox Church, near Endeavour, Saskatchewan, Canada
- Church of Prophet Elijah, Thessaloniki, Greece
- Profitis Ilias Church, Munichia, Piraeus, Greece

== Mountains in Greece ==
- Profitis Ilias, the highest peak of the Taygetus chain
- Profitis Ilias, the highest peak of Mainalo and of the Menalon mountain range
- Profitis Ilias (Rhodes)
- Profitis Ilias (Santorini)
- Profitis Ilias (Arhangelos)
- Mikro Profitis Ilias, a ridge on the Greek island of Santorini

== Other uses ==
- Profitis Ilias, Athens, a neighborhood of Athens in Greece
- Skete of Prophet Elijah, a monastic community in Mount Athos, Greece
