= Ilinci =

Ilinci Илинци (Serbian)
- Village (Selo)
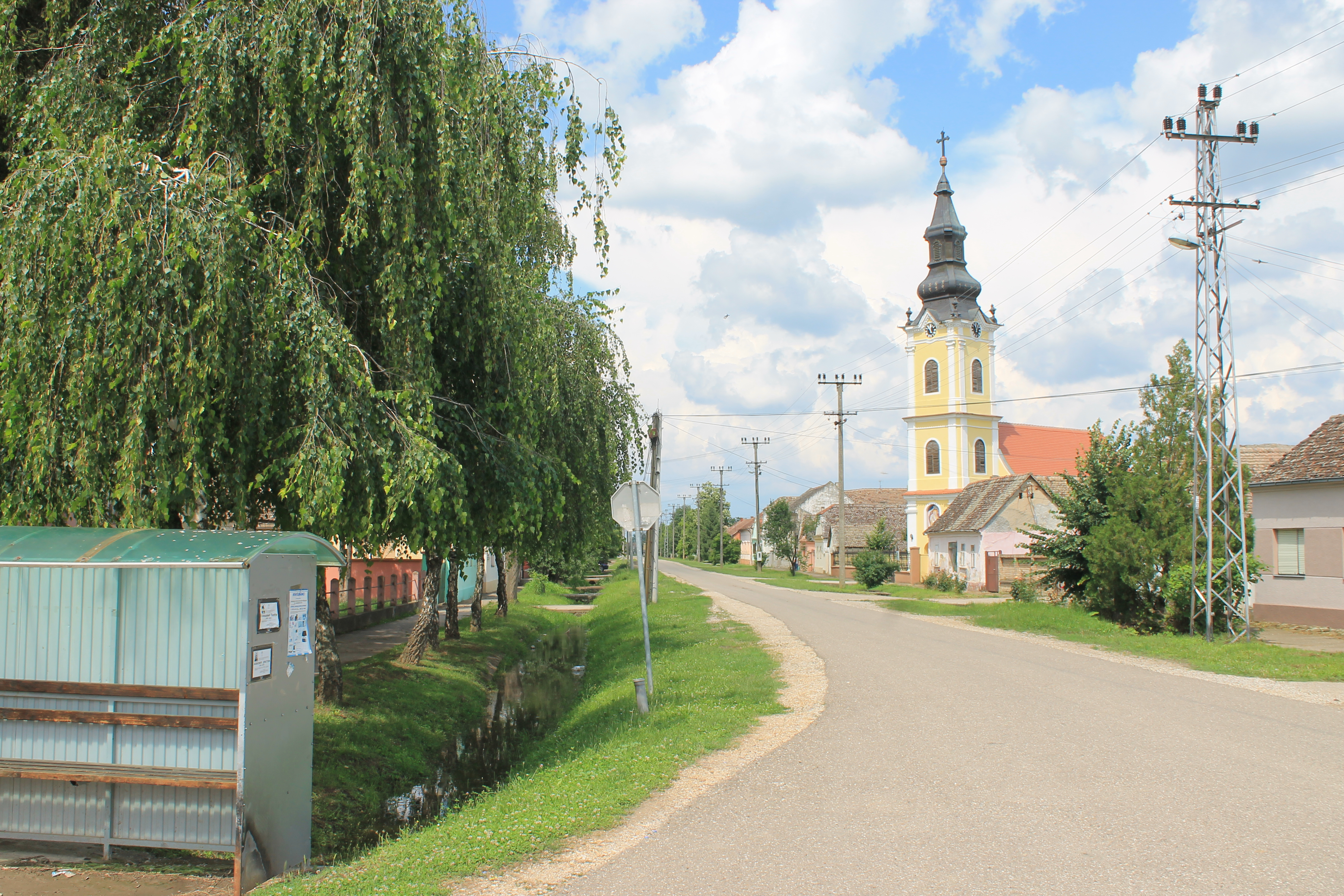
- Ilinci

- Location within Vojvodina Location within Serbia Location within Europe
- Coordinates: 45°06′49″N 19°07′29″E
- Country: Serbia
- Province: Vojvodina
- Region: Syrmia
- District: Srem
- Municipality: Šid

Population (2002)
  - Total: 827
- Time zone: UTC+1 (CET)
  - Summer (DST): UTC+2 (CEST)

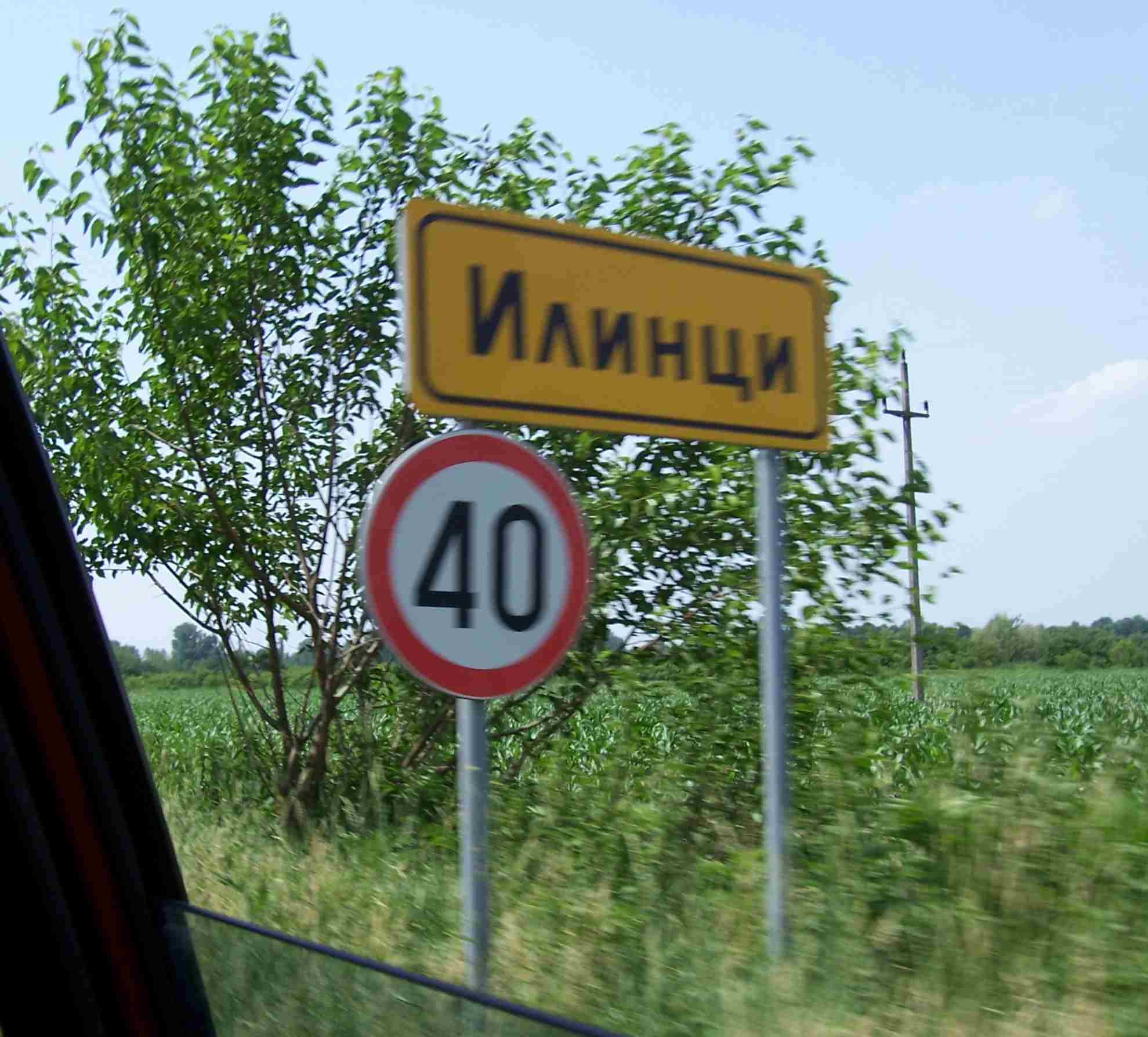
Ilinci

Ilinci (Serbian Cyrillic: Илинци) is a village in Serbia. It is situated in the Šid municipality, in the Srem District, Vojvodina province. The village has a Serb ethnic majority and its population numbering 827 people (2002 census).

== Name ==
Formerly, it was known as Sveti Ilija (Свети Илија). The name of the village in Serbian is plural.

== History ==
Following Ottoman retreat from the region, the Lordship of Vukovar was established, and the village became part of its domain in 1716 until 1737 when it was transferred back to Slavonian Military Frontier.

== Historical population ==
- 1961: 1,456
- 1971: 1,198
- 1981: 1,011
- 1991: 883
- 2002: 827

== See also ==
- List of places in Serbia
- List of cities, towns and villages in Vojvodina
- Church of St. Elijah, Ilinci
