= Saint Elias =

Saint Elias, the Latin form of the Hebrew name Elijah, may refer to any of:

== People ==
- Elijah, also known as Elias, an Old Testament prophet venerated as a Christian saint
- Elias and Companions (died 309), group of Egyptian Christian martyrs
- Elias I of Jerusalem (died 516), 5th-century Patriarch of Jerusalem from 494 to 516
- Ignatius Elias III (1867–1932), a Syriac Orthodox Patriarch of Antioch who is considered a saint in the Syriac Orthodox Church

== Places ==
- Mount Saint Elias, the second highest mountain in Canada and the United States
- Saint Elias Mountains, a mountain range in Alaska and the Canadian Yukon
- Mount Carmel in Haifa, also known as Mount Saint Elias (Jebel Mar Elyas)
- Saint Elias Monastery (Shwayya, Lebanon)

== See also ==
- St. Elijah's Church (disambiguation) also covering Church of Saint Elias
- Elias (disambiguation)
- Agios Ilias (disambiguation), Saint Elias in Greek
- Mar Elias (disambiguation), Saint Elias in Aramaic and Arabic
- Saint Elijah (disambiguation), Elias derived from Hebrew as Elijah
