= Salakos =

Salakos Σάλακος
- Community
- Location within Greece
- Coordinates: 36°17′N 27°56′E
- Country: Greece
- Administrative region: South Aegean
- Regional unit: Rhodes
- Municipality: Rhodes
- Municipal unit: Kameiros

Population (2021)
  - Community: 508
- Time zone: UTC+2 (EET)
  - Summer (DST): UTC+3 (EEST)

Salakos (Greek: Σάλακος) is a village of 500 people on the west side of Rhodes Island. It is 40 km from the capital Rhodes town and 7 km from the North West coast. The village is located on the hills of Mount Prophitis Ilias. Inhabitants are mainly employed in farming, livestock rearing and tourism.

The village is located next to a natural spring named Nimfi (Nymph), for the mythological deity who protected springs and running water. There is one tourist hotel and other local accommodation, and several tavernas. The village is famous for its walnuts, numerous sightseeing walks, and its stone-paved and shady square, with fresh spring running water and ficus trees (Rhodian ficus/retusa nitida, planted March 3, 1951). There was also a flourishing chair-making industry but this has now diminished.

In 1422, the large rural area (casale) of Salakos was granted in fief to Antonio of the Genoese Cattaneo family.

The village was involved in the Easter 1919 protests against Italian occupation of the Dodecanese, when the schoolmistress was arrested as she led her pupils out of the central church singing the Greek National Anthem. The mayor intervened and she was at once released, but her pupils continued singing nationalist songs prompting the Italian garrison commander to draw his sidearm, whereupon the townsfolk rushed him. The situation was defused when the mayor persuaded the crowd to return the gun, and in reprisal some prominent locals were imprisoned.

On the wall of the Italian-era police station and library there is a plaque acknowledging the food and aid provided by the Red Cross to local inhabitants in 1945. Below the village is the natural mineral water bottling plant of NYMFI AE, an important local employer.

== Monuments and Antiquities ==
Halfway through the village, past the new platea, on the right-hand side, are the remains of the village flour mill, a stone construction powered in its time by both animals and water; a short stretch of the aqueduct can still be seen attached to the rear of the squat mill tower. The platea itself is not the original, which was further within the village and had the traditional kafenion, now closed. The Italians designed and located the new platea, with its trees and ornate stone fountain, during their occupation of the island.

There are the sparse remains (walling) of a minor fortification of the Order of the Knights of St. John (late 15th/early 16th century AD) near the platea; stones from this were used to build a small one-room mosque during Ottoman/Turkish rule, one of only very few remains of such architecture on the island, and in very poor repair, it was in use until the 1950s. East of the village are the outlines of a demolished early Christian basilica, marked on maps as Παλαιοχριστιανική βασιλική. It has been suggested that it was dedicated to Agia Marina, but there is no archaeological evidence for this. The large central village church of the Dormition, although modern looking, has 14th-century origins; of the old frescoes, just the face of a single saint is preserved in the north aisle.

The small village oil/wine press in the castle area has recently been restored; it contains a 19th-century manual iron screw press made by Victor Coq – ‘machines agricoles et viticoles’ of Aix-en-Provence, France.

== Flora and Fauna ==
The rare tree Liquidambar orientalis is recorded in the Nymfi stream valley.

== Noteworthy Personalities and Residents ==
Teacher and man-of-letters, Fotis Varelis (1911-2012) was born here. There is a memorial to him at the ancient Nimfi Springs above the village.

Historian Christódoulos Papachristodoúlou (1899-1988) was born and raised in properties around the old castle and there is a commemorative plaque near a huge plane tree.
