= Church of the Holy Prophet Elijah, Smolinskoye =

Church in Smolinskoye, Russia

Church of the Holy Prophet Elijah
- Церковь Илии Пророка (Смолинское)
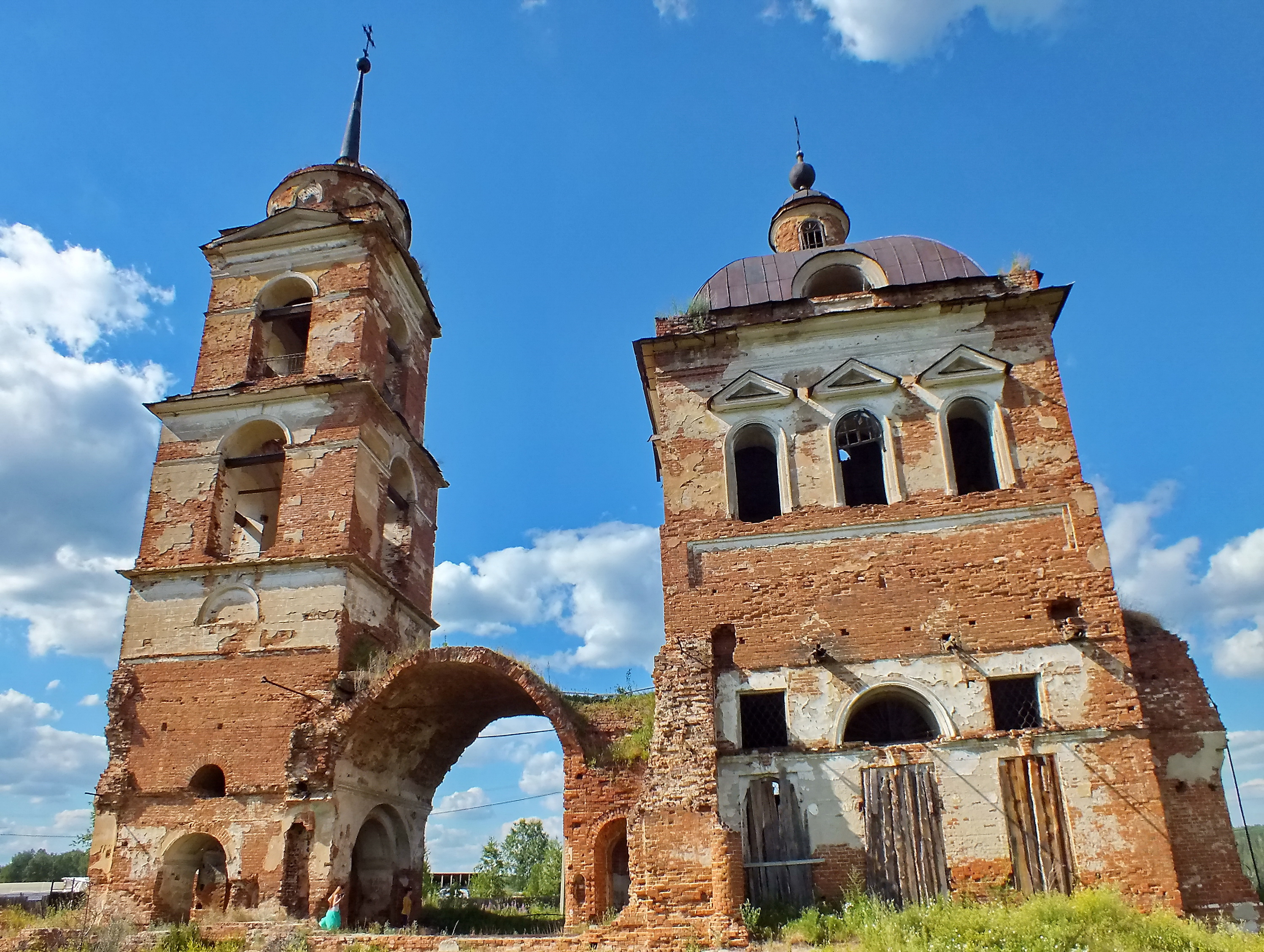
- Interactive map of the Church of the Holy Prophet Elijah area

General information
- Architectural style: Classicism, Baroque
- Location: Smolinskoye
- Coordinates: 56°25′30″N 61°38′41″E
- Construction started: 1823
- Completed: 1857

Church of the Holy Prophet Elijah - is an Orthodox church in Smolinskoye village, Sverdlovsk oblast.

The church was granted the status of regional significance on 28 December 2001 (the Sverdlovsk oblast Government Decree № 859). The object number of cultural heritage of regional significance is 661710759300005.

== Description ==
The first mention of the church building in the Smolin village dates back to the second half of the 18th century, when Archpriest Feodor Kochnev consecrated a wooden church on July 5, 1770. The wooden building was badly damaged by a fire in 1822. Already in 1823 a letter was received for the construction of a new capital building.

Today's church building is located in the western part of the village. The temple is a model of the buildings of late classicism and at the same time an example of baroque traditions of the Urals in the second half of the XIX century.

The church is stone, three-table, Sergius. Construction started in 1823. The main temple was consecrated on June 11, 1847, by the letter of Arkady, bishop of Perm in the name of the Prophet Elijah by the local priest Matii Popov. The right limit was consecrated on November 6, 1877, in honor of the Exaltation of the Cross of the Lord, the left limit was consecrated on November 2, 1881, in the name of the Great Martyr Dmitry Solunsky. In 1887-1893 the iconostasis was renovated, the walls of the main church were painted. In 1895 the building was plastered and bleached.

The parish included a chapel in the village of Perebor in the name of St. Stephen, bishop of Perm and a wooden cross at the Smolin caves. The maintenance of the church was allocated 19 rubles annually from the funds of church stores. Also in the village of Perebor since 1892 there was a school of reading and writing.

The building was closed in 1940. Currently not restored, half-destroyed.

== Literature ==
- Свод памятников истории и культуры Свердловской области. Vol. 2. Екатеринбург: Сократ. 2008. p. 648. ISBN 978-5-88664-323-7 – via ред. В.Е.Звагельская.
- Бурлакова Н.Н. (2011). Забытые храмы Свердловской области. Екатеринбург: Сократ. pp. 128–129. ISBN 978-5-88664-395-4.
