= Zebulon Elijah =

American politician

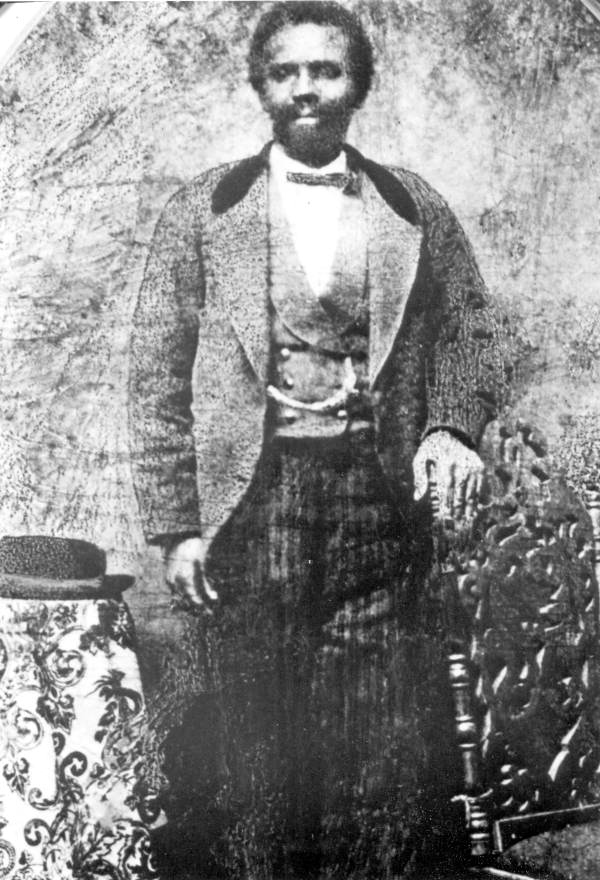
- Portrait of Florida State Representative Zebulon Elijah - Escambia County, Florida

Member of the Florida House of Representatives from the Escambia County district
- In office 1871–1873

Personal details
- Born: 1836 or 1838 Santa Rosa County, Florida
- Died: 1910 (aged 73–74) or 1910 (aged 71–72)

Zebulon Elijah (1836 or 1838 - 1910) became a state legislator and government official in Florida after having been enslaved. He was born in Santa Rosa County, Florida. Elijah served in the Florida House of Representatives from 1871 to 1873 representing Escambia County. He later became a postmaster in Pensacola from 1874 to 1878 and a tax assessor in Pensacola from 1881 to 1882. He resigned from the legislature after the passage of a Federal law prohibiting federally appointed officials from also holding state or municipal offices. George E. Wentworth also served as postmaster in Pensacola.

== See also ==
- African American officeholders from the end of the Civil War until before 1900
