= Church of Elijah the Prophet (Belozersk) =

Church in Vologda Oblast, Russia

Coordinates: 60.031767°N 37.772823°E

Church of Elijah the Prophet (Belozersk) Церковь Илии Пророка Cerkov' Ilii Proroka
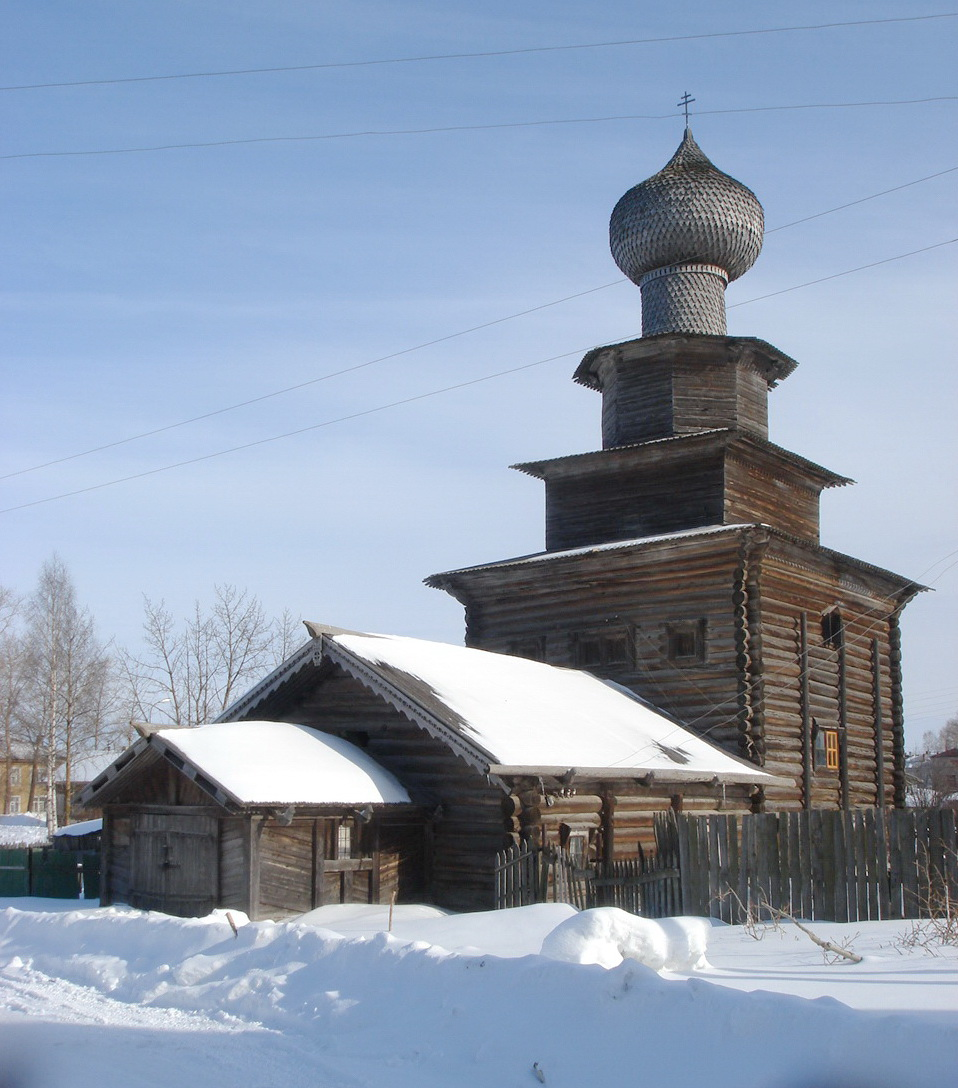

Religion
- Affiliation: State Russian Museum; Russian Orthodox
- Status: Museum

Location
- Location: Belozersk, Russia
- Interactive map of Church of Elijah the Prophet (Belozersk); Церковь Илии Пророка; Cerkov' Ilii Proroka

Architecture
- Completed: 1690

Church of Elijah the Prophet is the wooden Russian Orthodox church of a tiered type located at Belozersk in Vologda region. It was built in 1690–1696 and consecrated in honor of the prophet Elijah. The church is listed as the cultural heritage site of federal significance in Russia.

The church was built in 1690–1696 at the western outskirts of Belozersk at the place of an old tented-roof church, “decrepit by longevity”. Some information about that ancient building can be found in the Patrol Book of 1617–1618.

The church was used as a summer (cold) one. In winter time all services were held in the nearby church of the Intercession of the Most Holy Theotokos. There was no bell tower at the new St. Elijah Church but modern Russian researcher K. I. Kozlov had suggested that the two neighboring churches had a common separate bell tower. If so, this complex was the typical example of the northern three-component churchyard.

By the beginning of the 20th century, the building had reached in a modified form: the log house was sheathed with hemp, large windows were cut in the main quadrangle, and the plowshare was replaced by iron in the cover of the domes.

In 1962–1968, the church was restored according to the project of Evgeny Alexandrovich Chernikov (scientific guidance by Boris Vasilievich Gnedovsky). During the restoration, the quadrangle, refectory and apse were freed from late boarding. The later windows, opened at the northern and southern facades were sealed, and the original portage windows, closed with a plank from the inside, were restored. The new roof was made, while wooden gutters were restored on wooden consoles - “chickens”, and the domes were covered with wooden plowshares again. The lower dilapidated rims of the logs were replaced by the new ones. As for the main load-bearing structures of the church, they were only pulled together with vertical screed logs. The interior decoration was preserved only partially.

In 1974 the church was included in cultural heritage list as the object of national significance in the USSR. Now it is as well presents in the cultural heritage list as the object of federal significance of Russia.

In 1987–1995 Olga Alexandrovna Sokolova and ValeryAlexandrovich Mitrofanov from Vologda Special Scientific and Restoration Workshop had restored 56 icons of the temple.

In 2008 new restoration was announced. And it had started with full dismantle of the building. From 2012 the construction is slowly recovering.

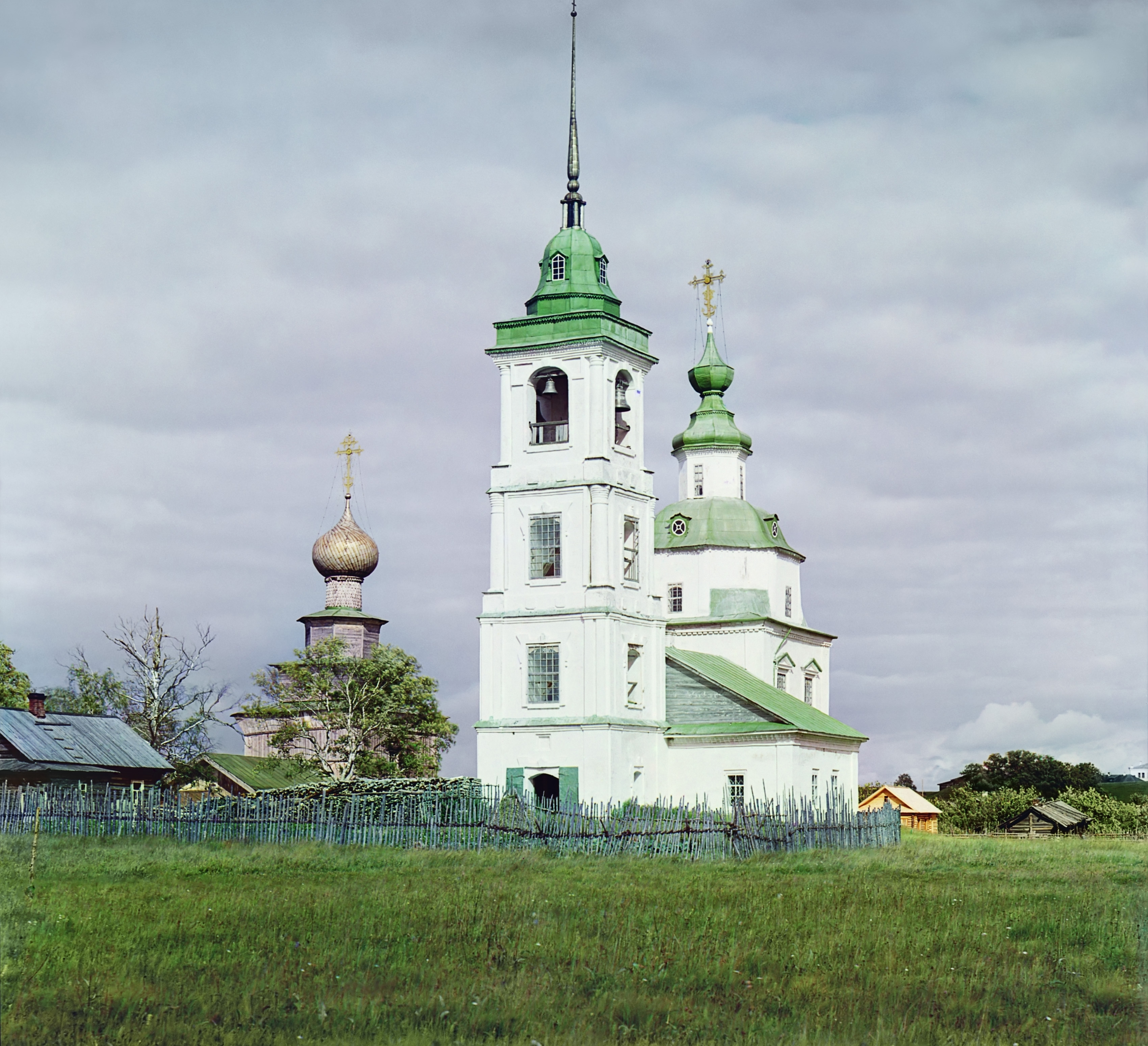
In an ensemble with the Church of the Intercession in 1909

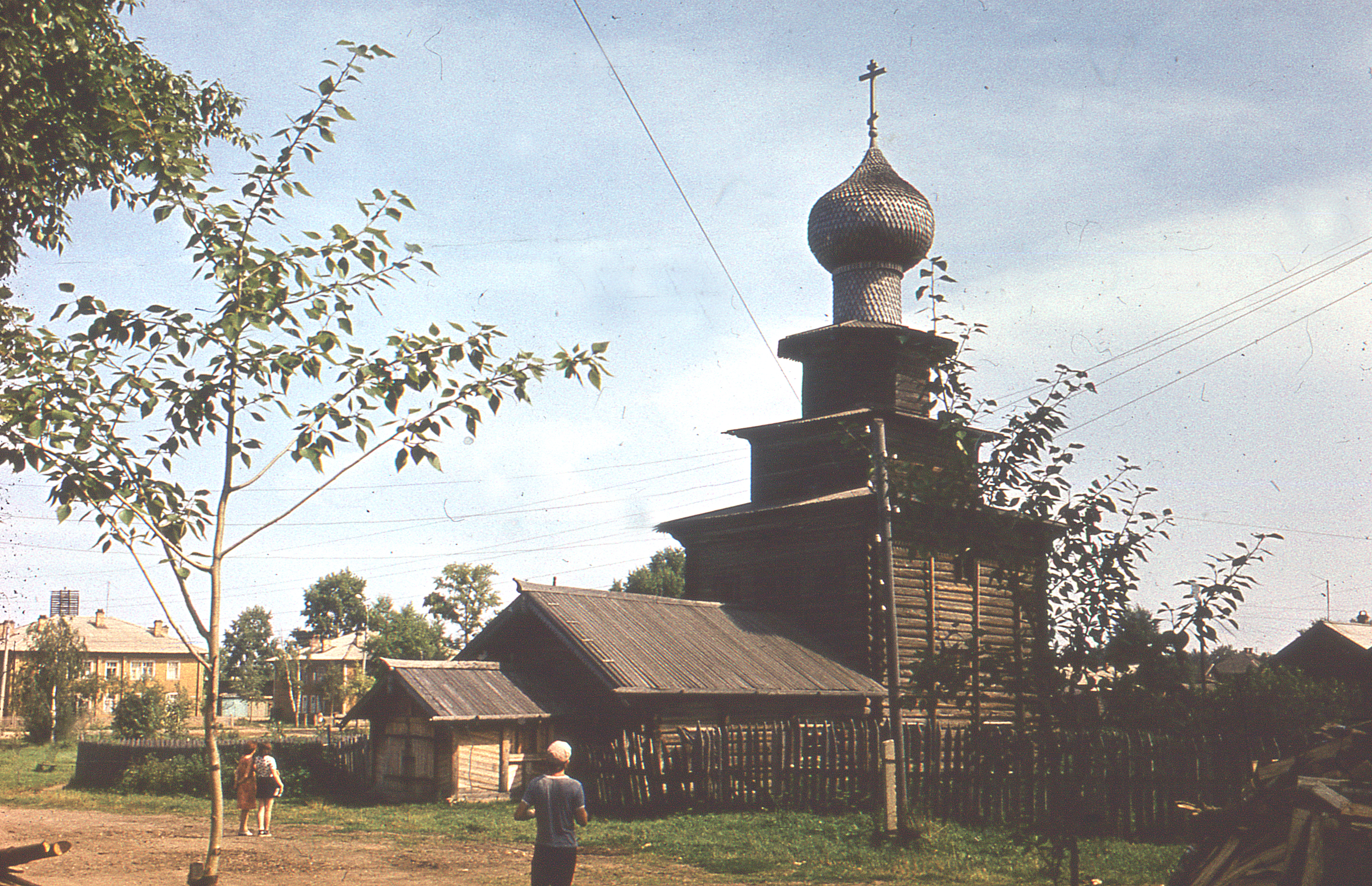
Southern facades in 1978 (after the restoration of 1962–1968)

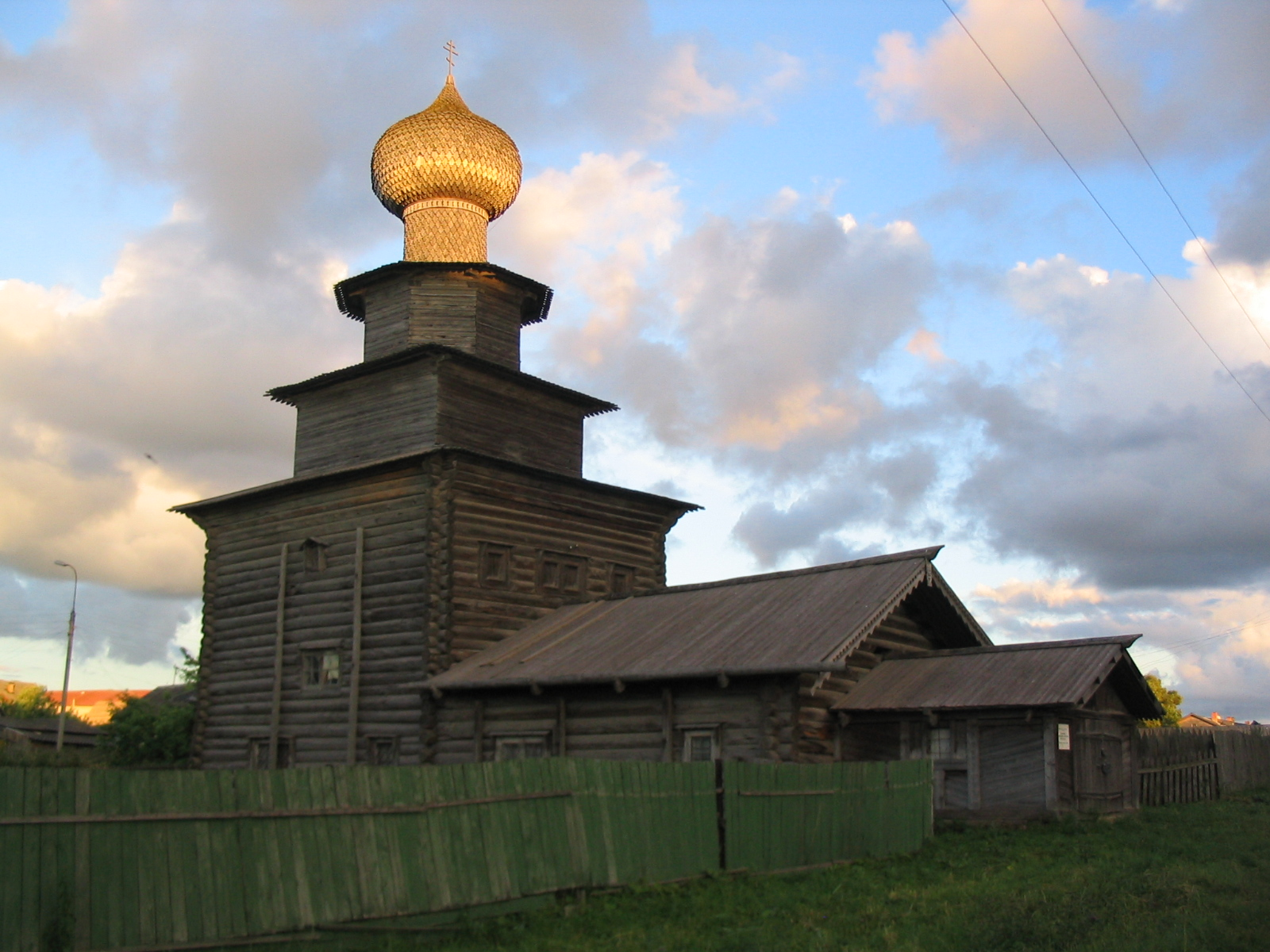
Northern facades in 2006 (after the restoration of 1962–1968)

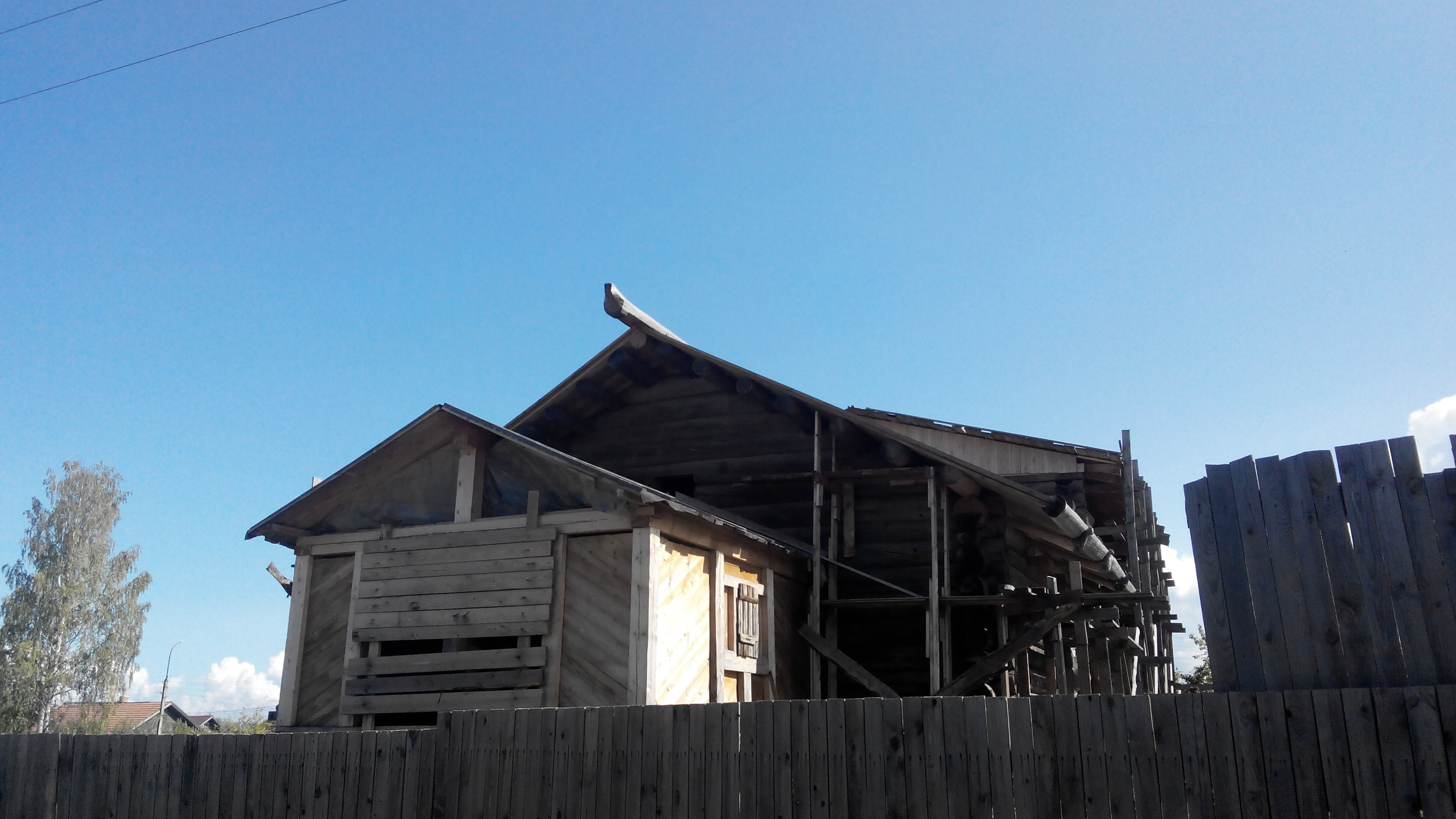
In 2014 — the process of nowadays restoration that had started in 2008 with total dismantle of the building

== Literature ==
- Герасимова, М. С. (2013). "QR-35 — Церковь Ильи Пророка // Система информирования об объектах культурного наследия Вологодской области" (in Russian). Вологда: Древности Севера.
- Козлов, Константин Иванович (2007). Белозерск. Описание города, его храмов и достопамятностей (in Russian). М.: Северный Паломник. p. 232.
- Митрахович, Саша (2017). "Ильинская церковь в Белозерске" (in Russian). Достопримечательности мира: фото, описание, карта достопримечательностей городов и стран мира.
