= Church of St. Elijah, Ilinci =

Church of St. Elijah
- Црква Светог Илије
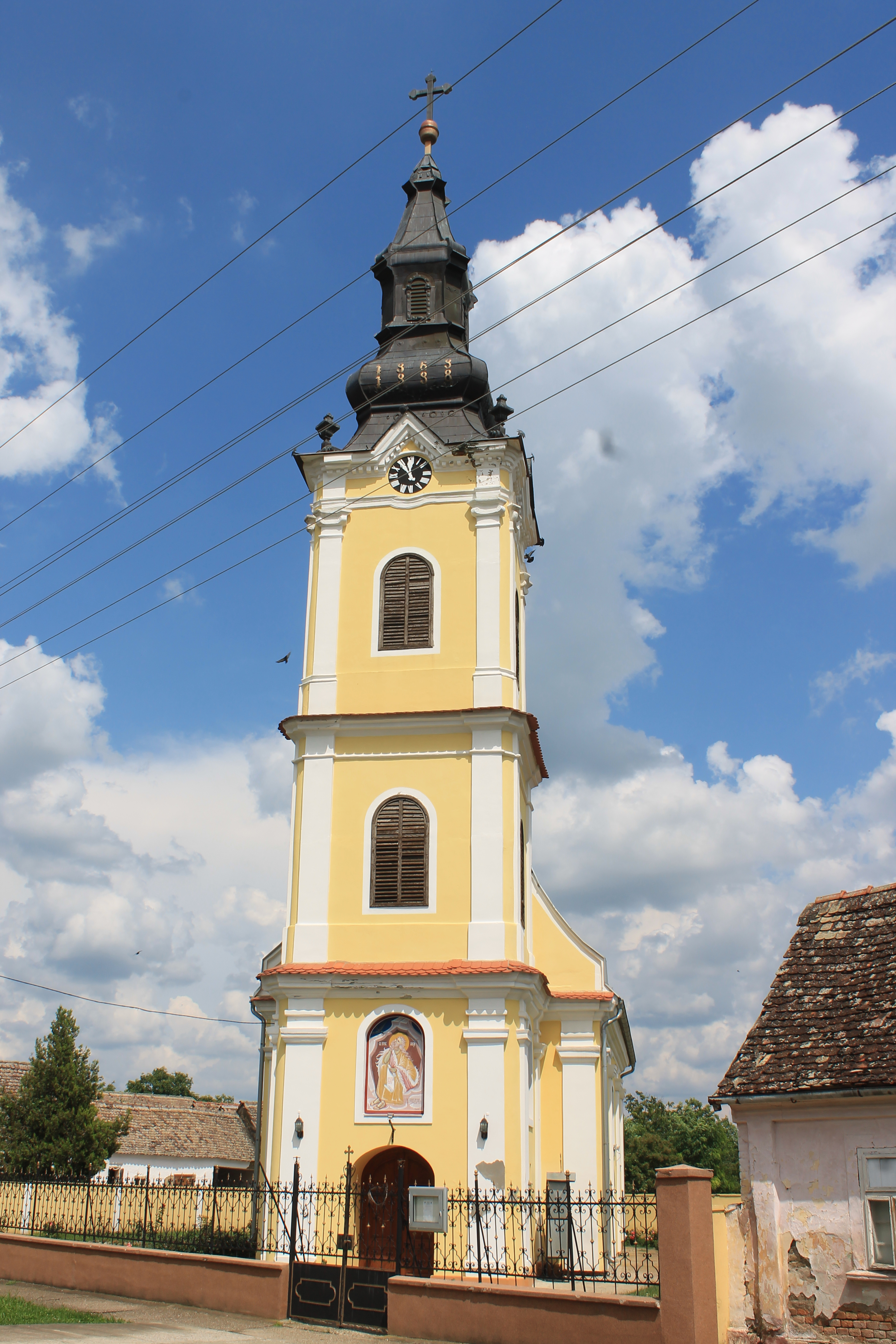
- Church of St. Elijah, Ilinci
- Church of St. Elijah
- 45.114172°N 19.125750°E
- Location: Ilinci
- Country: Serbia
- Denomination: Serbian Orthodox

History
- Status: Church
- Founded: 1727
- Dedication: Saint Elijah

Architecture
- Functional status: Active

Administration
- Diocese: Diocese of Srem

The Church of Saint Elijah (Serbian: Црква светог Илије, romanized: Crkva svetog Ilije) is а Serbian Orthodox church located in the village of Ilinci, in Vojvodina, Serbia. The church was built in 1727. The village of Ilinci was named after its protector Saint Elijah whose name in Serbian is spelled as sveti Ilija. The new church tower was built in 1806 with a church clock bought from Zemun from the company Pantelić company. The iconostasis was restored in 1877.

Within the Eparchy of Srem the church is organized into subdivision of the Church of St. Nicholas, Šid. The church was reconstructed or adapted on several occasions with main interventions taking place in 1888, 1921, 1939 and 1965.
