= St. Elijah–Rahova Church =

Heritage site in Bucharest, Romania

Coordinates: 44°25′34″N 26°05′52″E

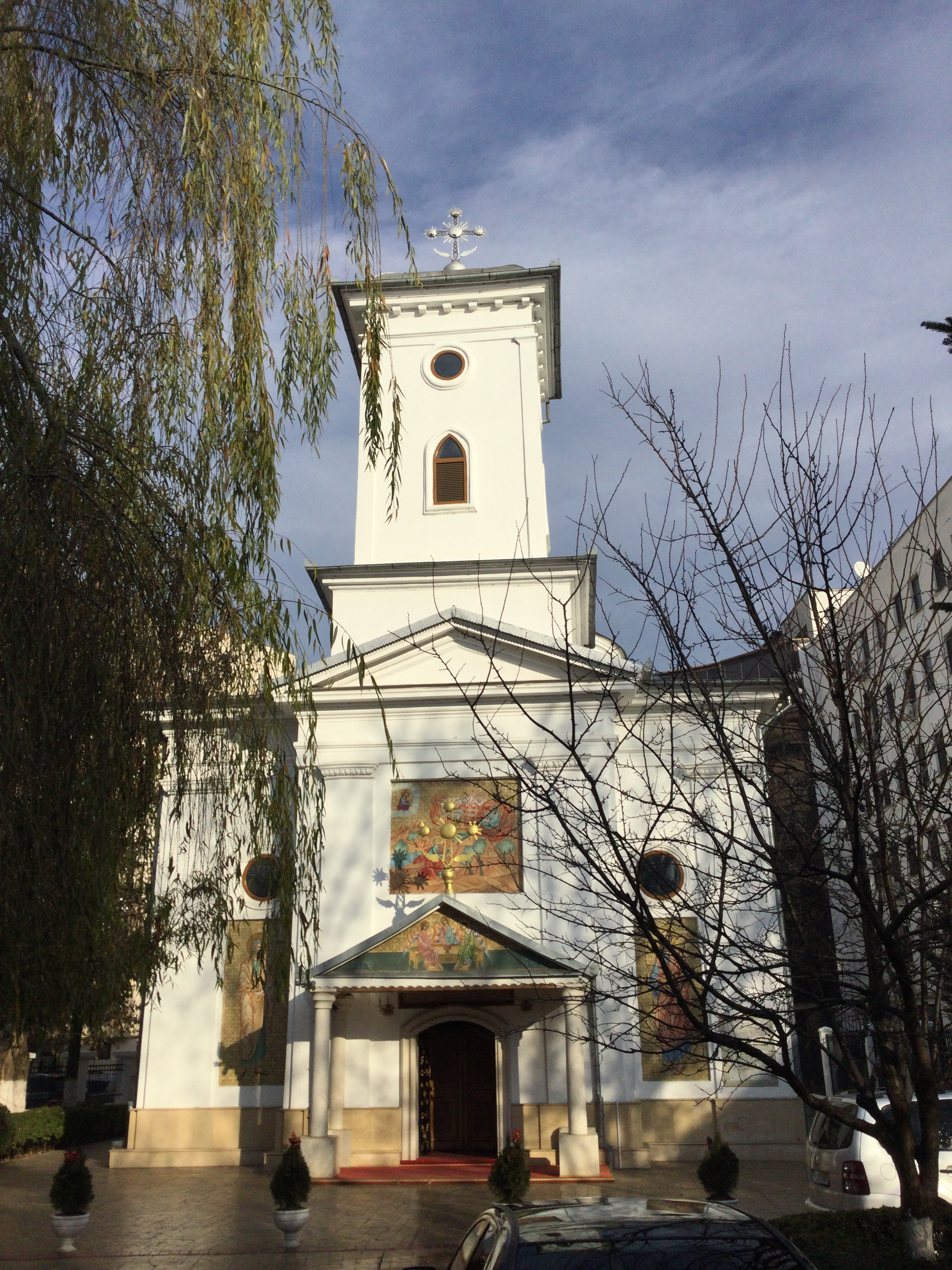
St. Elijah–Rahova Church

The St. Elijah–Rahova Church (Romanian: Biserica Sfântul Ilie–Rahova) is a Romanian Orthodox church located at 79 Constantin Silvestru Street in Bucharest, Romania. It is dedicated to the Prophet Elijah.

The church was built on the site of an earlier church, called Gorgănel, that had been founded in 1706 by Safta, the daughter of Constantin Brâncoveanu, and destroyed during the 1802 earthquake. Vornic Fotache Știrbey led an initiative to rebuild the church, which after his 1828 death was taken up by Neofit, the Bishop of Râmnic, and Ban George Filipescu. The land, inherited by Iancu Bălcescu (uncle of Nicolae), was sold in 1835 to Clucer Bobescu. The new church was built in 1837-1838. The main restoration took place in 1874, with a consolidation being undertaken after the 1940 earthquake. The arches were tied with metal cables, while the dome was encircled by iron girds, saving it from demolition, a fate that befell many damaged domes.

The interior was painted by Gheorghe Tattarescu in 1874; he signed on the nave wall, at the feet of his patron, Saint George. His work was restored in 1950 and again in the 1990s; the stained glass dates to 1993. The funerary stones of ktetor Știrbey and his wife Ralița are found on the right side of the entrance. The grave of the Urlățenii boyars is on the left. The grave of Scarlat Urlățeanu, who supervised the construction, was once located near the entrance on the exterior; the headstone is now at Antim Monastery. In 1895, a group of buildings, some on the site of the old cells, was erected around the church; these came to house stores, guest rooms and apartments. Executed in an eclectic style, with elements of Beaux-Arts, they enclosed a courtyard of 35 by 40 meters, with rich vegetation. In 1984, during the systematization drive of dictator Nicolae Ceaușescu, the buildings were demolished. The church itself was only spared through protests by the priest and his parishioners. It was nevertheless moved 49 meters, and is now situated behind apartment blocks. It was renovated after the Romanian Revolution and rededicated in 1994.

The church features a rectangular plan, measuring 27.4 meters long and 12 meters wide. It has a semicircular altar apse and two domes. The larger, circular one is above the nave, while the square bell tower sits on the narthex. The style is Neoclassical, while the low, ample main dome recalls Greek basilicas. The facades have pilasters resting on a stone base, holding up a classical cornice. The western facade ends in a pediment. Entry is through an open vestibule supported by two slender columns. This was added later and is out of harmony with the massive structure. The altar window has a richly carved original frame. This has its origins in Moldavia, but also has Gothic accents, and is similar to a frame introduced by Vasile Lupu at the Stelea Monsstery church he founded in Târgoviște. Artisans enriched the design with older local motifs: lone buds that, unusually, encircle the cylindrical shapes on the upper end; or the Brâncovenesc accents of the egg-and-darts enclosed by Acanthus mollis leaves.

The church is listed as a historic monument by Romania's Ministry of Culture and Religious Affairs.
