= Elijah (2024 film) =

2024 short drama film

- Directed by: Razid Season
- Written by: Razid Season
- Produced by: Razid Season
- Starring: Ajaz Alam; Mithila Gazi; Debjani Banerjee
- Cinematography: Uladzimir Taukachou
- Edited by: Emanuele Michetti
- Music by: Upasak Mukherjee, Orazio Saracino
- Production company: Image Maker Films
- Distributed by: Image Maker Films
- Release date: November 2, 2024 (Boston)
- Running time: 20 minutes
- Country: United States
- Languages: English; Bengali

Elijah is a 2024 American short drama film produced, written, and directed by Razid Season.

It is a narrative film by Season, inspired by true characters. The film follows a Bengali Muslim yellow cab driver who faces mounting pressure in New York City from financial hardship and fading dreams, as well as his daughter's coming out as transgender, forcing him to reexamine the limits of his love and understanding.

The film had its initial release in the festival circuit in November 2024 and has been screened at numerous film festivals. The film stars Asian American actors as well as American actors. Harvey Brownstone, the first openly gay judge in Canada, is the film's executive producer. Piotr Kajstura and Richard Kwolek are the producers.

The film was screened at several Asian American Pacific Islander Film Festivals in May 2025 as part of AAPI Heritage Month.

== Plot ==
Haider, a Bengali Muslim taxi driver faces the reality that the American Dream may never be his. Grueling hours, rude customers, a collapse in medallion values and suicides among fellow drivers continually chip away at his hope for the future. Under this backdrop, crisis spills into his family life as his child, Shoshi, is consumed by a struggle: a desire to live life fully as man in a transphobic immigrant culture. His relationship with his transgender son challenges his past views on LGBTQ issues, forcing him to confront prejudice in his community to protect the child he loves.

== Cast ==
- Ajaz Alam as Haider
- Mithila Gazi as Elijah
- Debjani Banerjee as Mother of Elijah
- Shaesta Khan as Bride
- Samad Alamgir as Mozammel
- Titu Gazi as Bakshi
- Eva Visco as Passenger
- Edis JD as Passenger
- Adela-Adriana Moscu as Passenger
- Mir Azam as Friend of Haider
- Devon Slotnick as Friend of Elijah
- Marsin Mogielski as Drag Queen

== Awards ==
Award	Date of ceremony	Category	Recipient(s)	Result	Ref.
Phoenix Film Festival Film	29 March 2025	Best Short	Razid Season	Won (Audience Choice Award [2nd Place])	
Tasveer Film Festival (Academy Awards-qualifying film festival)	12 October 2025	Best LGBTQIA Film	Razid Season	Won (Tasveer Emerald Award)	
Massachusetts Independent Film Festival	26 April 2025	Best Narrative Short	Razid Season	Won (Outstanding Achievement Award)	

== Community Screenings ==
The film has been invited by a number of organizations around the U.S. that include the University of California, San Francisco, Asian Pacific Statewide Alliance of California, The Bryant Library, Gay Senior Center of Queens, Genesis Cinema in London, New Plaza Cinema and the Brooklyn Community Pride Center.

== External Reviews ==
Subtle But Powerful: 'Elijah' is a meticulous depiction of gender, identity, culture and immigrant struggle. Author: A. K. M Ashraful Amin, Dallas Voice

Film Review: The Duality Of Family In Razid Season's Elijah. Author: Abigail Zara, Muskoka 411

'Elijah' Tells Story of Belonging and Identity. Author: Vaibhavi Badve, Sampan

Elijah（以利亚）讲述了归属感和身份的故事. Sampan

Film Review 'Elijah': Trans Coming-Of-Age Brings Hope To Immigrant Cinemas. Author: Patricia Colmenero, Muskoka 411

চলচ্চিত্র 'ইলাইজা' : "আধুনিক সভ্যতার নতুন এক সংকটের সঙ্গে পরিচয় করিয়ে দেয়। Author: Qazi Islam Prothom Alo
