= Temple of Elijah the Prophet =

Coordinates: 44°10′9.4″N 79°59′47.3″E

The Temple of Elijah the Prophet
- The Temple of Elijah the Prophet
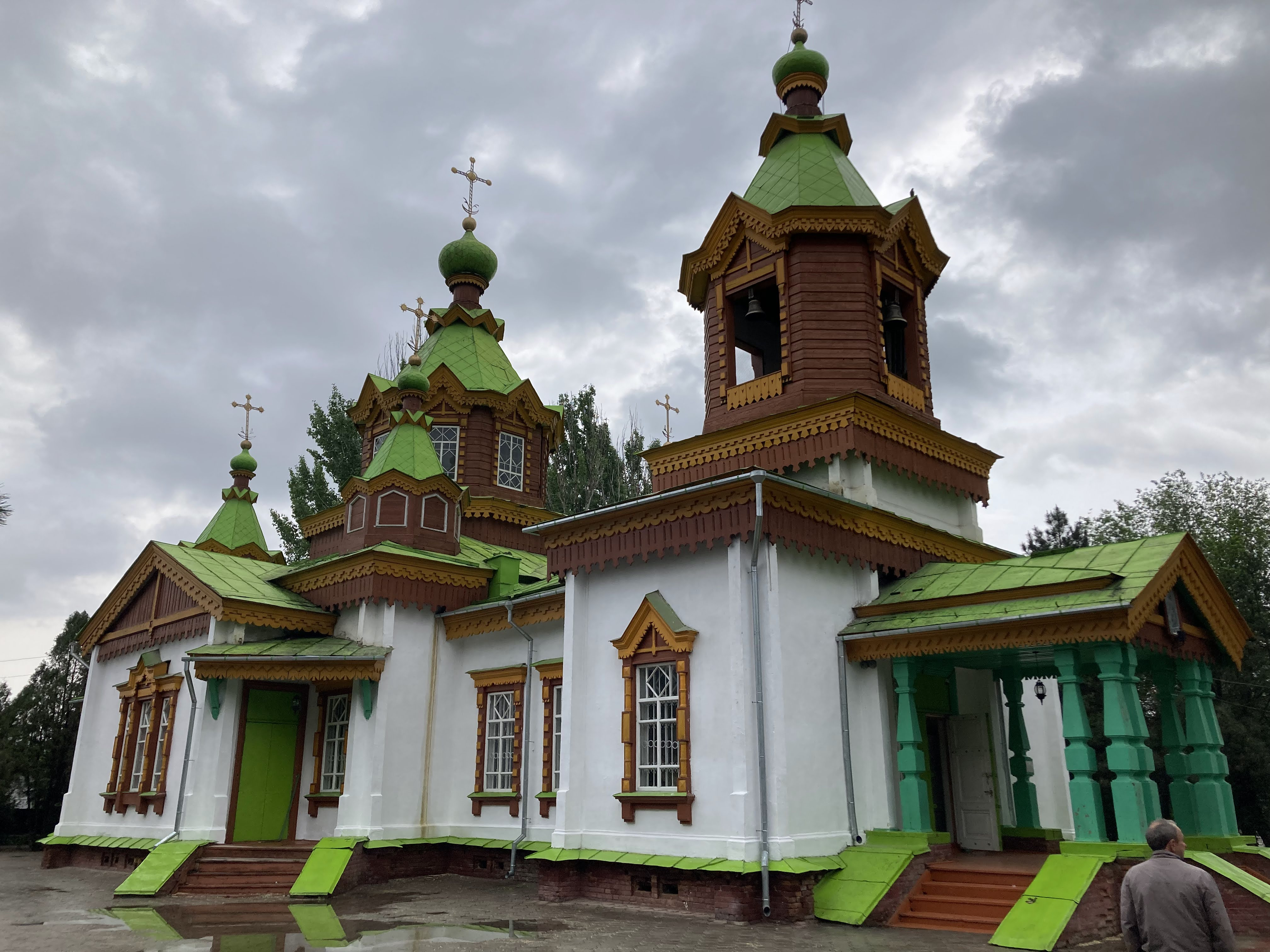
- The Temple of Elijah the Prophet
- Location: Almaty region, Zharkent city
- Country: Republic of Kazakhstan
- Denomination: Eastern Orthodox

The Temple of Elijah the Prophet is an Eastern Orthodox Church in Jarkent, built in 1892, in the same style as the Vernensky Cathedral.

== Specification ==
The temple building is constructed from Tian Shan spruce. The building stands on a brick and lime foundation. It is a chopped building with detailed decorative carvings. The building has a cruciform and five domes on the roof. The church measures 36 feet (11 m) by 71 feet (22 m), and has a capacity of 750 people. The belfry contains six bells. The crosses of the church are covered with scarlet, iron, and bronze. The building was designed by the popular sacral architect S. K. Troparevsky who also designed the St. Nicholas Cathedral in Almaty.

The church parish has a library and runs a Sunday school.

== History ==
The construction of the building took five years, and was funded by donations. On December 22, 1900, priests Mikhail Uspensky, Viktor Illarionov and Alexander Komarovsky consecrated the Church. Under the USSR, the church building closed and used as a grain warehouse, sports hall, school and club.T he building became dilapidated. From 1991 to 1994, the church was reconstructed, and started functioning again in 1991. Since May 17, 1992, the rector of the church has he priest Pavel Ivanov.

== See also ==
- Russian Wikipedia: Храм Пророка Илии
