= Profitis Ilias (Rhodes) =

Mountain in Rhodes, Greece

Coordinates: 36.2724°N 27.9331°E

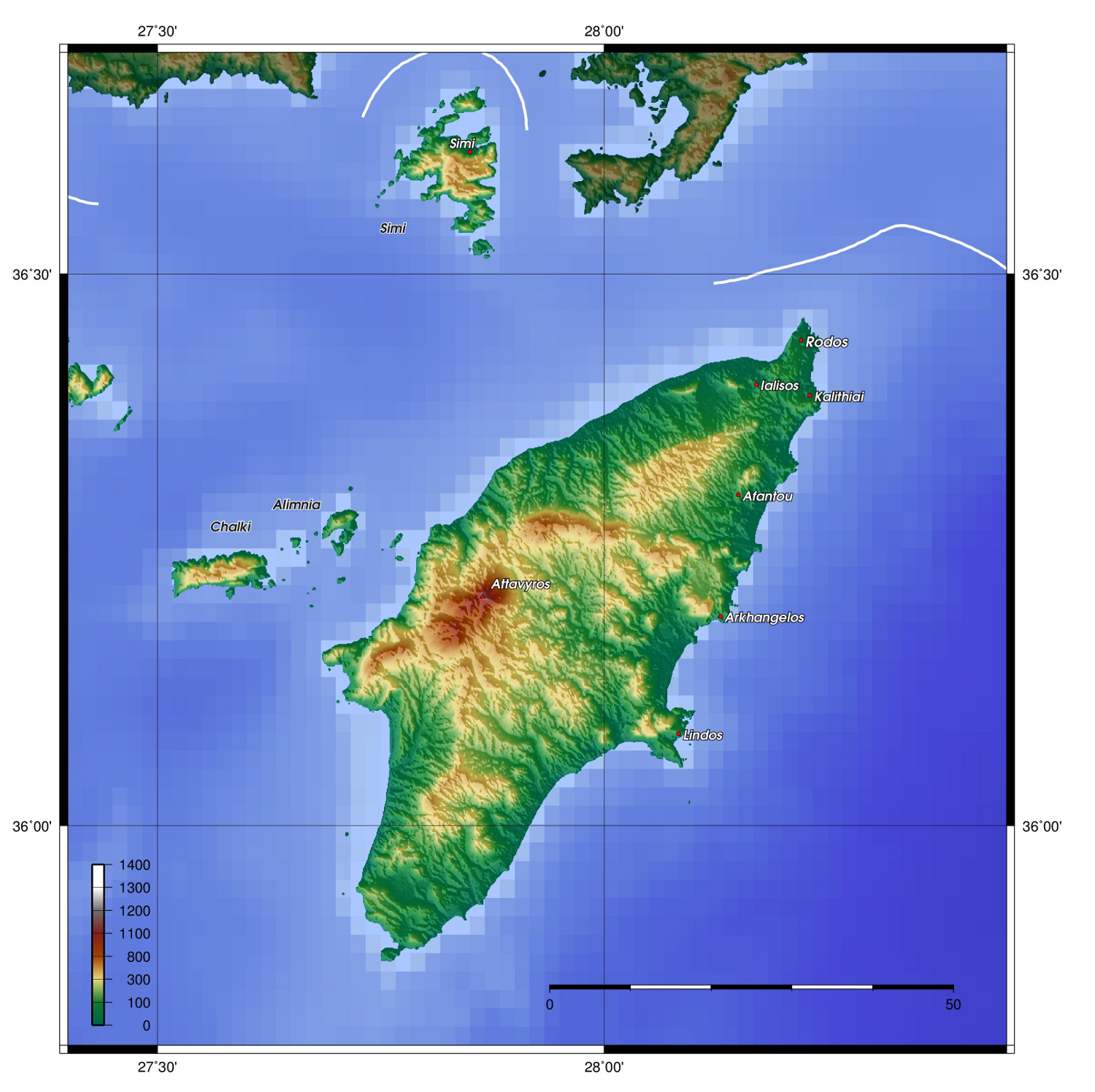
Topographic map. Profitis Ilias is the W-E range North of the higher Attavyros range

Mount Profitis Ilias is a 798-metre-high (2,618 ft) mountain on the Greek island of Rhodes. It is named for the biblical Elijah.

== Geology ==
Profitis Ilias is formed of uplifted fault blocks themselves a product of the Hellenide orogeny which produced a stack of Alpine nappes of Mesozoic age. These are part of the Pindos-Olonos series of low-grade metamorphic limestone sediments. The mountain overlooks Middle Miocene-Pleistocene sedimentary basins. Sudden topographic variations and land instabilities are due to a multitude of thrust faults. Ophiolites, usually gabbro occur.

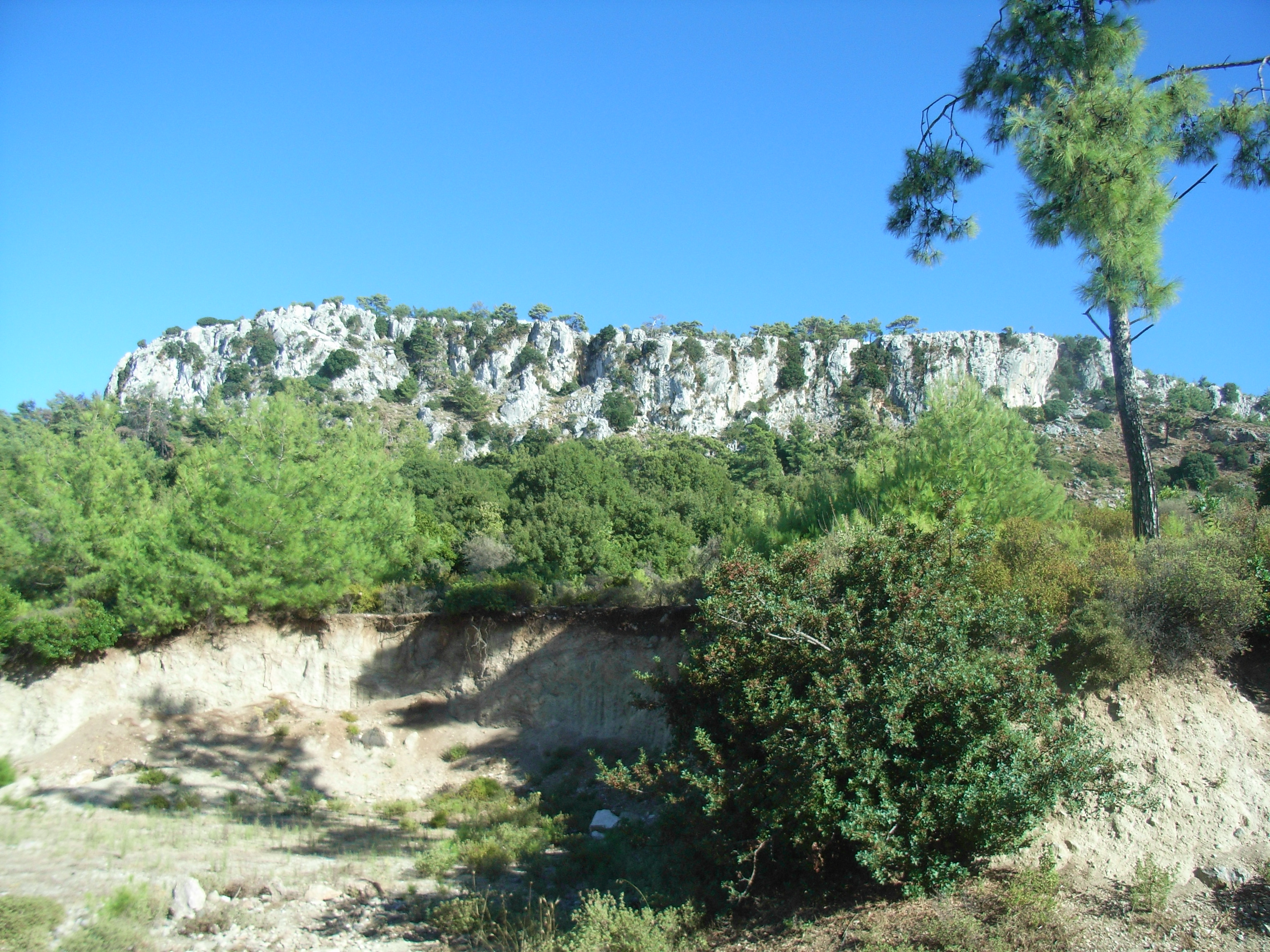
Fault-line cliff on Profitis Ilias. In the foreground are friable rocks of Middle Miocene-Pleistocene age.

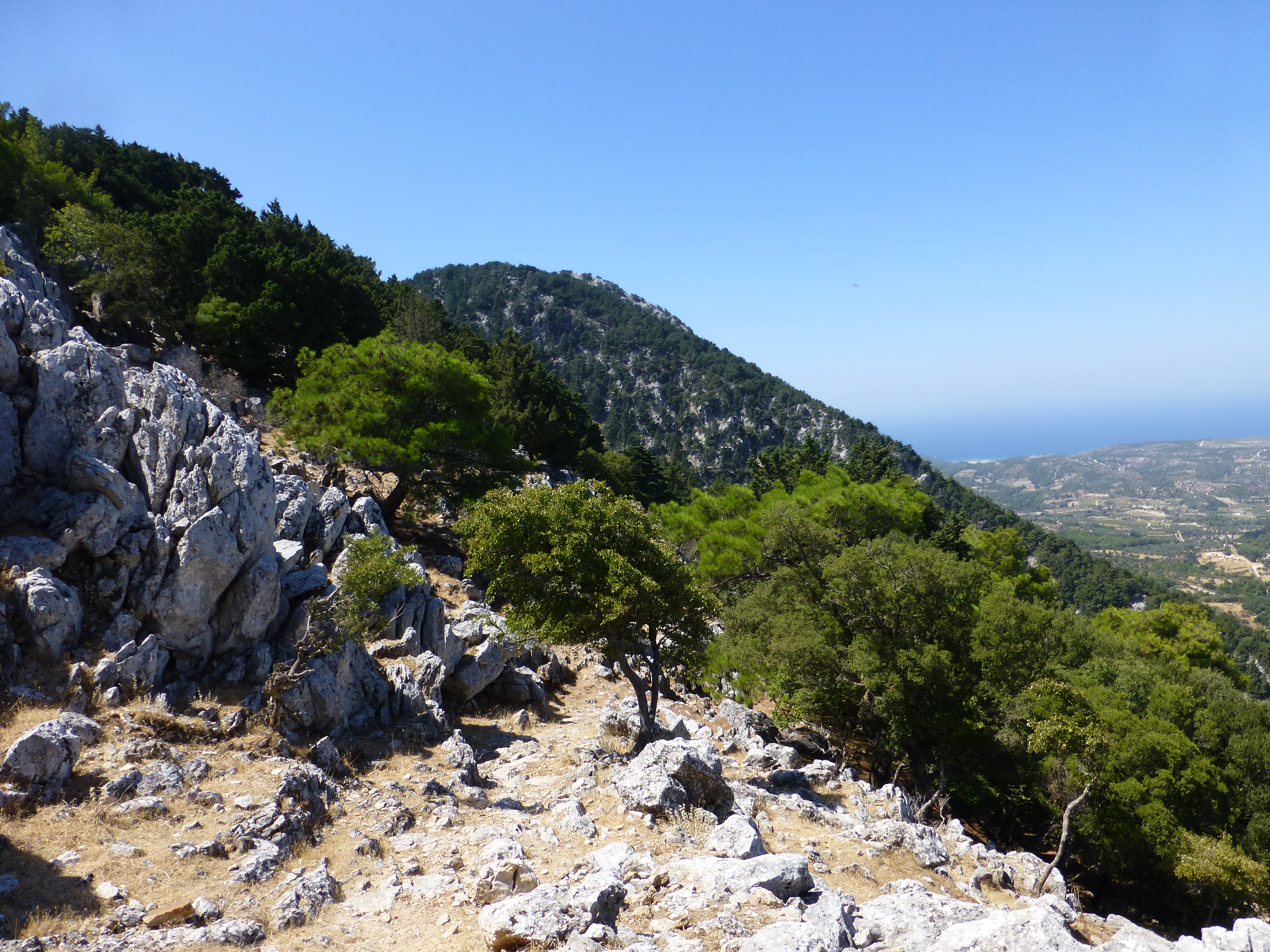
Fractured tectonic limestone by the path to Salakos. Middle Miocene-Pleistocene sediments on the plain below.

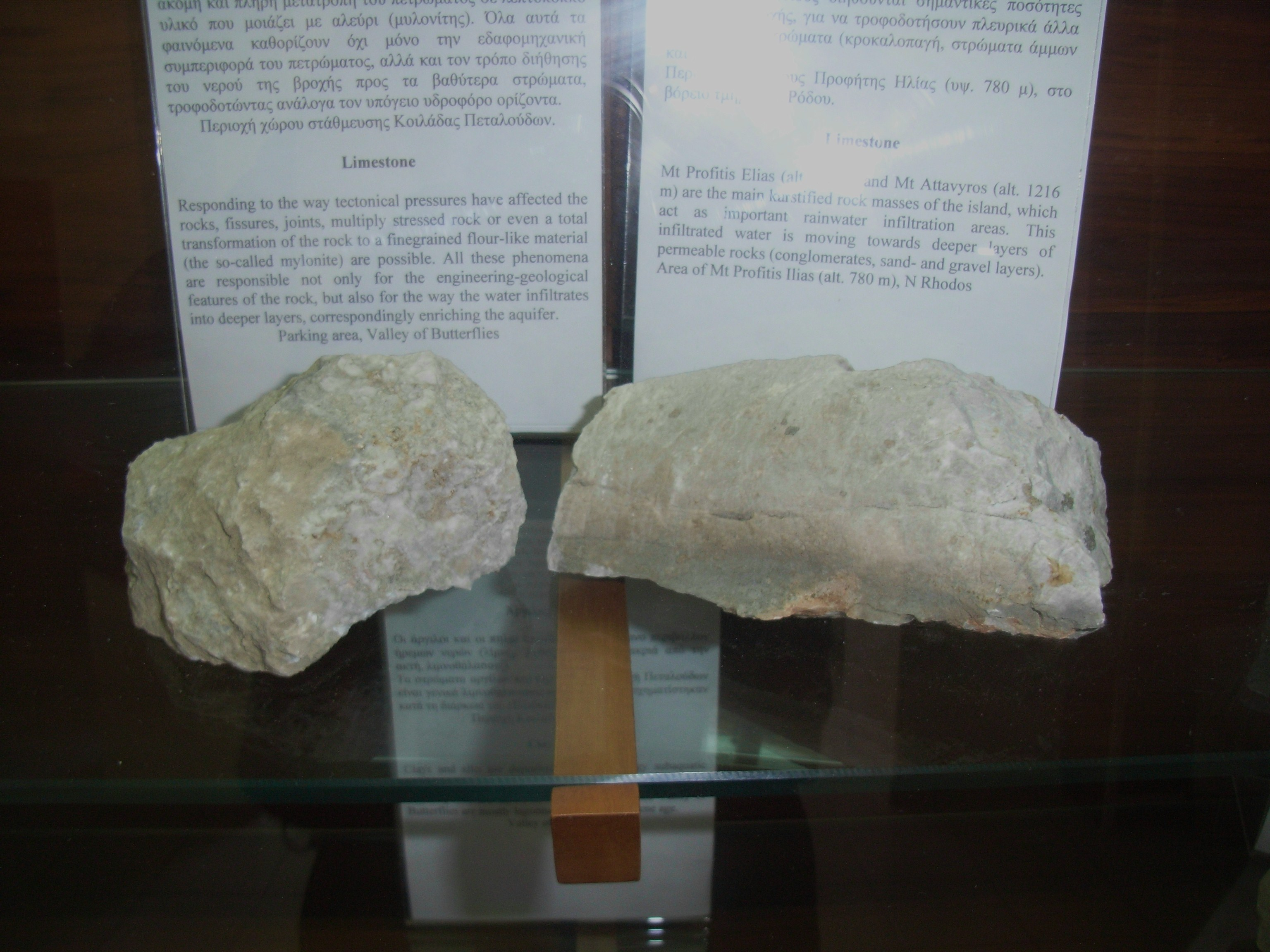
Tectonic limestone on display at Nature Museum Petaloudes

== Botany ==
Profitis Ilias is covered with forests of pines (Pinus brutia) and cypress (Cupressus sempervirens) and maquis shrubland. Notable are the Rhodes Paeony Paonia rhodia and Cyclamen rhodium. The large parasitic orchid Limodorum abortivum grows in the pinewoods. Also notable are Ophrys ferrum-equinum, the Profitis Ilias Bee Orchid Ophrys fuciflora ssp. oreas (found only here), Ophrys arachnites ssp. attica, Ophrys lutea, Ophrys oestrifera ssp. dodekanensis, Orchis italica, Cephalanthera longifolia, Orchis provincialis (high altitudes moist woodland Prophitas Ilias only)

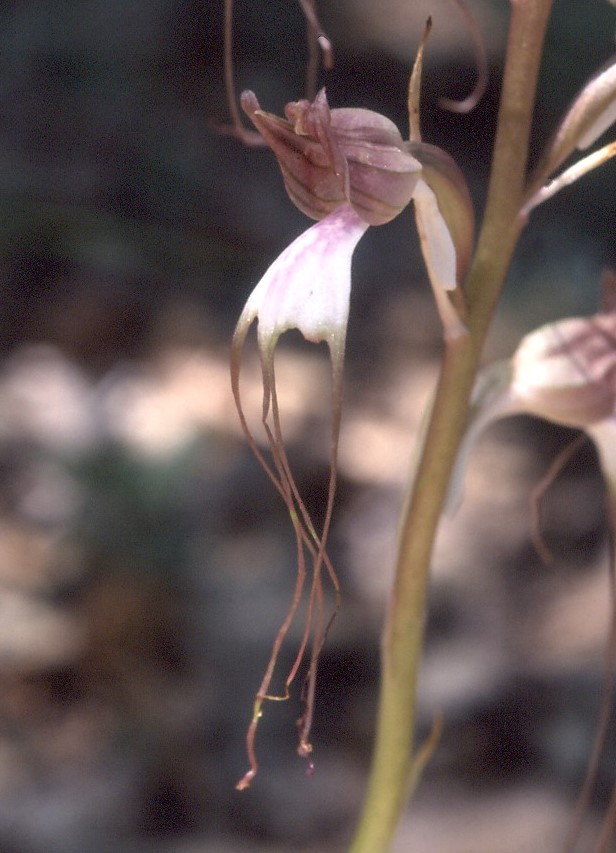
Himantoglossum comperianum

== Zoology ==
In Spring and Autumn many passage migrants occur. Rare snakes include leopard snake and Dahl's whip snake. The Mediterranean house gecko is more common.

== History ==
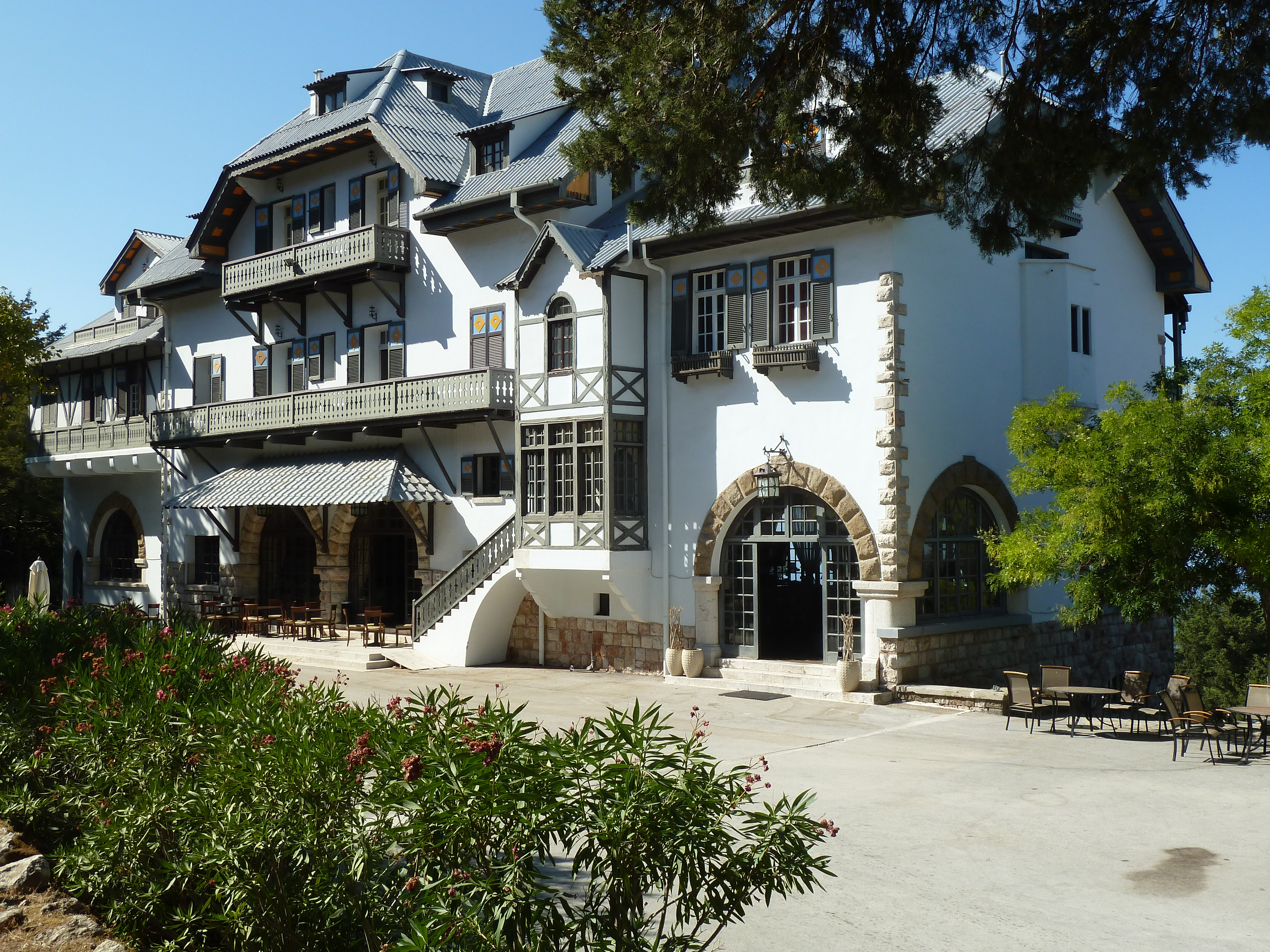
Hotel Elaphos. Built in the Alpine Style. It is an example of Architectural conservation

Near the summit and 8 km from Eleousa are Hotel "Elaphos and Elaphina" and the Byzantine monastery named "Prophetes Elias". There are two hotel buildings, a three-storeyed one, "Elaphos" (now restored and functional) and a two-storeyed one, the "Elaphina. The "Elaphos" hotel was built by the Italian colonists in the Dodecanese in 1929 as Albergo del Cervo (Deer Hotel) In 1930, a ground floor restaurant, a large veranda, a tennis court and a dancing floor were added. Later, the second floor was constructed (replacing the veranda). In 1932 the building was extended with a new wing, called "Elaphina". The hotel was named after the deer Dama dama platoni that lives in the adjacent woods.

=== De Vecchi's House ===
This villa was the summer residence of General Cesare Maria De Vecchi, Italian Governor of Rhodes between 1936–1940. It is opposite to and overlooks the Hotel "Elaphos and Elaphina", amongst trees on the hill behind the taverna.

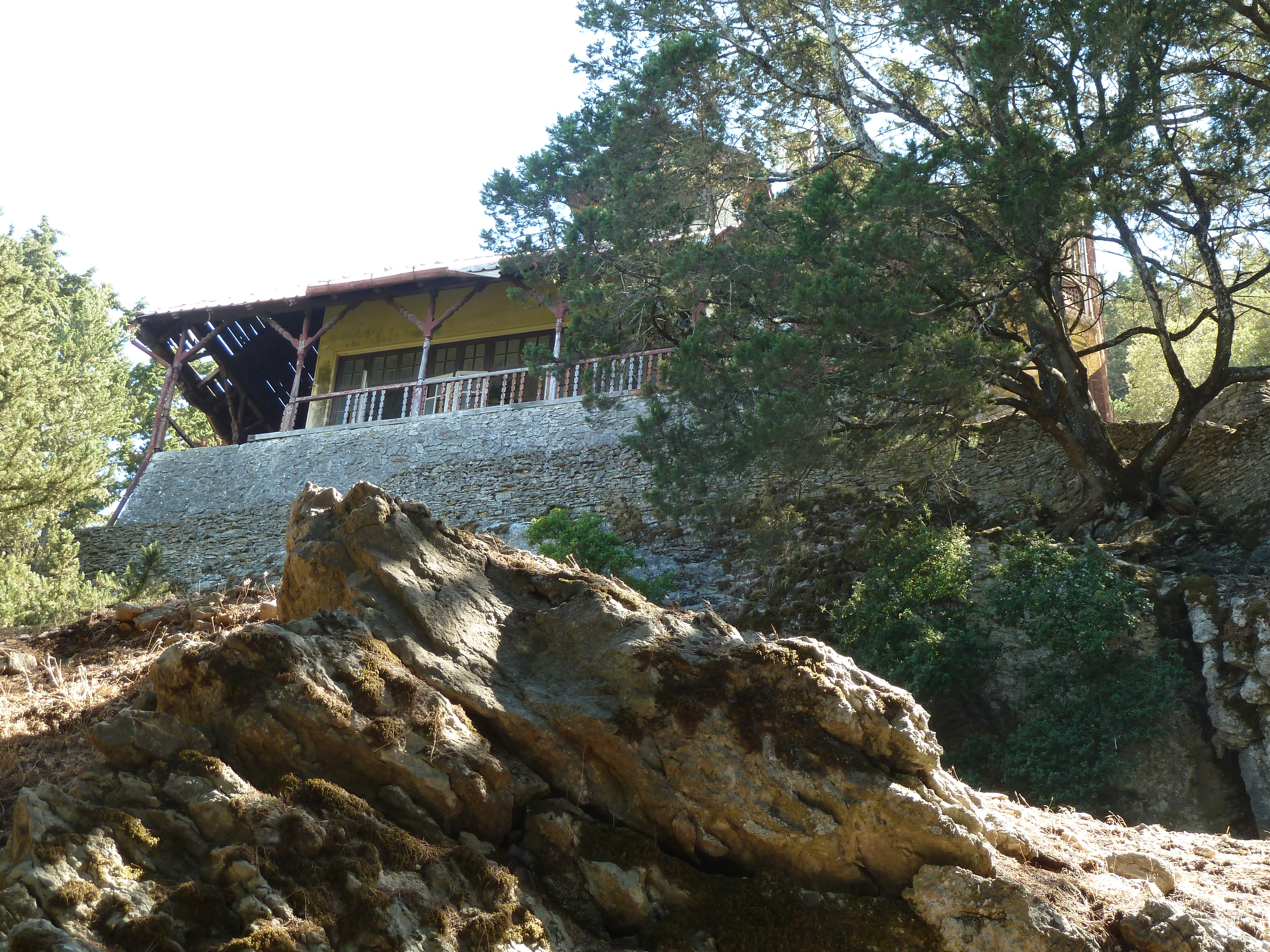
Mussolini's House

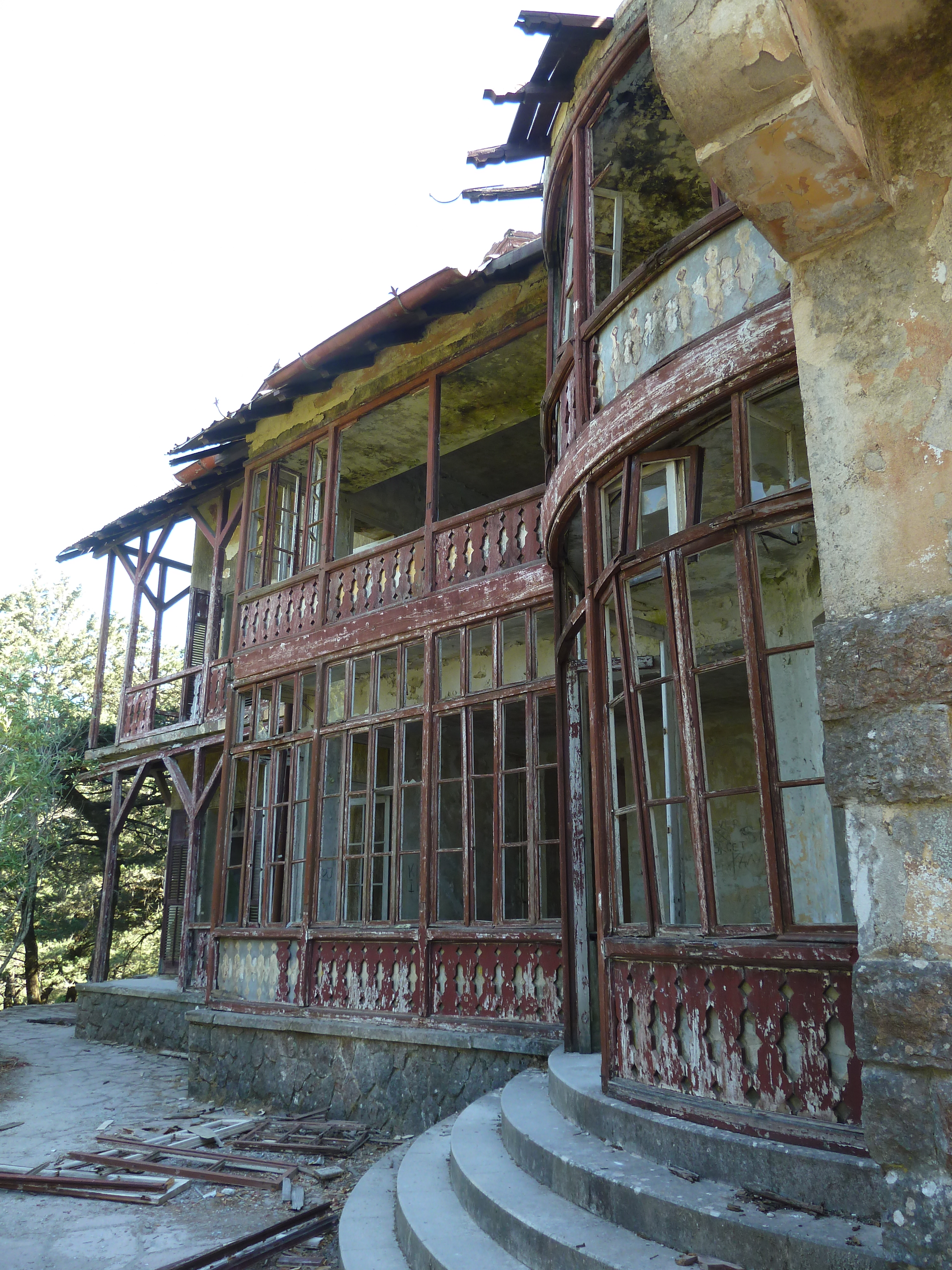

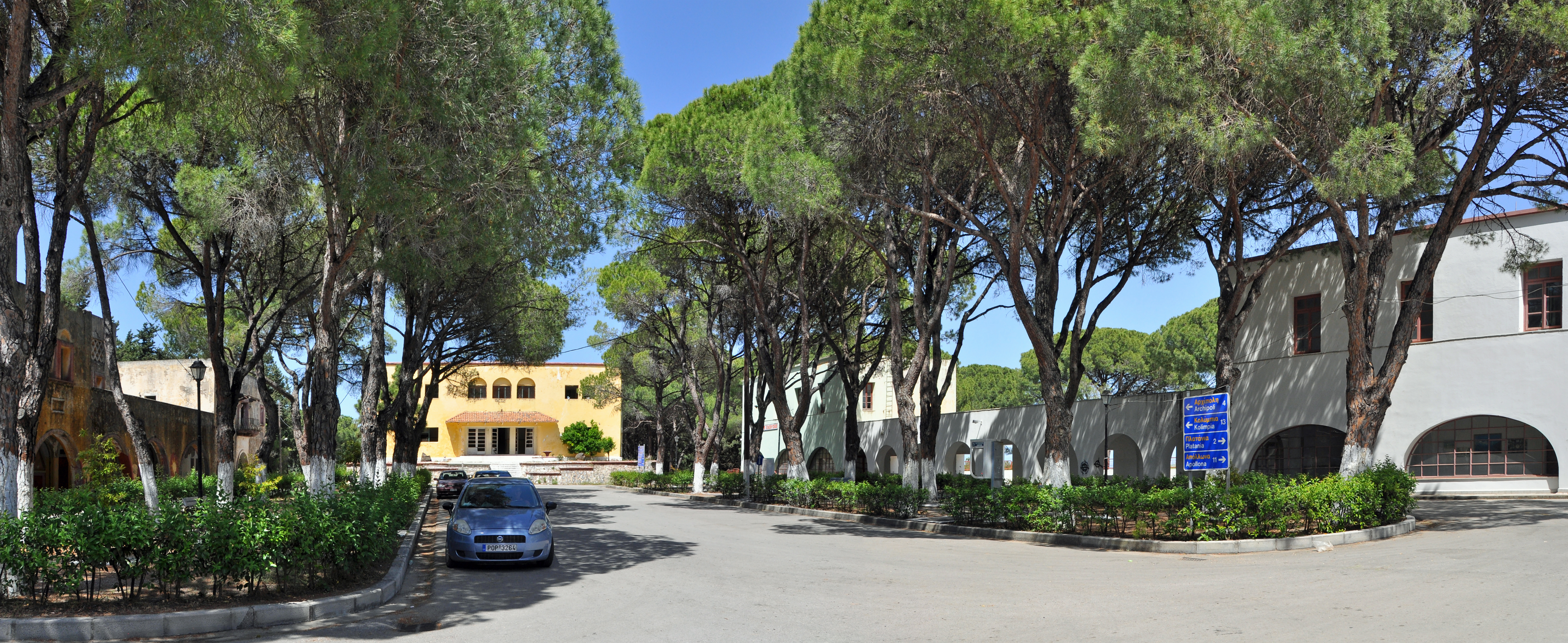
Eleousa (Profitis Ilias-Campochiaro

=== Eleousa ===
8 km from the hotel Elaphos is the village of Eleousa founded as Profitis Ilias-Campochiaro. During their occupation of Rhodes the Italians built four agricultural villages that were to be populated by Italian settlers. Three of them stood not far from the coast: San Benedetto (Kolymbia), San Marco (near Kattavia) and Peveragno (Kato Kalamata). Profitis Ilias-Campochiaro lay more inland. The settlers each received a house and a plot of land. Those at the montane Profitis Ilias-Campochiaro came from the Trentino-Alto Adige /Südtirol.

Profitis Ilias-Campochiaro (Eleousa) dates back to 1935–1936. The village was constructed with a Roman Catholic church (now Greek Orthodox) a school, shops, a Casa del Fascio (formerly with a tower), municipal services, medical facilities and a cinema. All these buildings were (and are) grouped around a rectangular town square. Hydraulic works were also carried out, to allow irrigation and hydroelectric power generation. The round pond with fountain just outside the village is a part of this system.

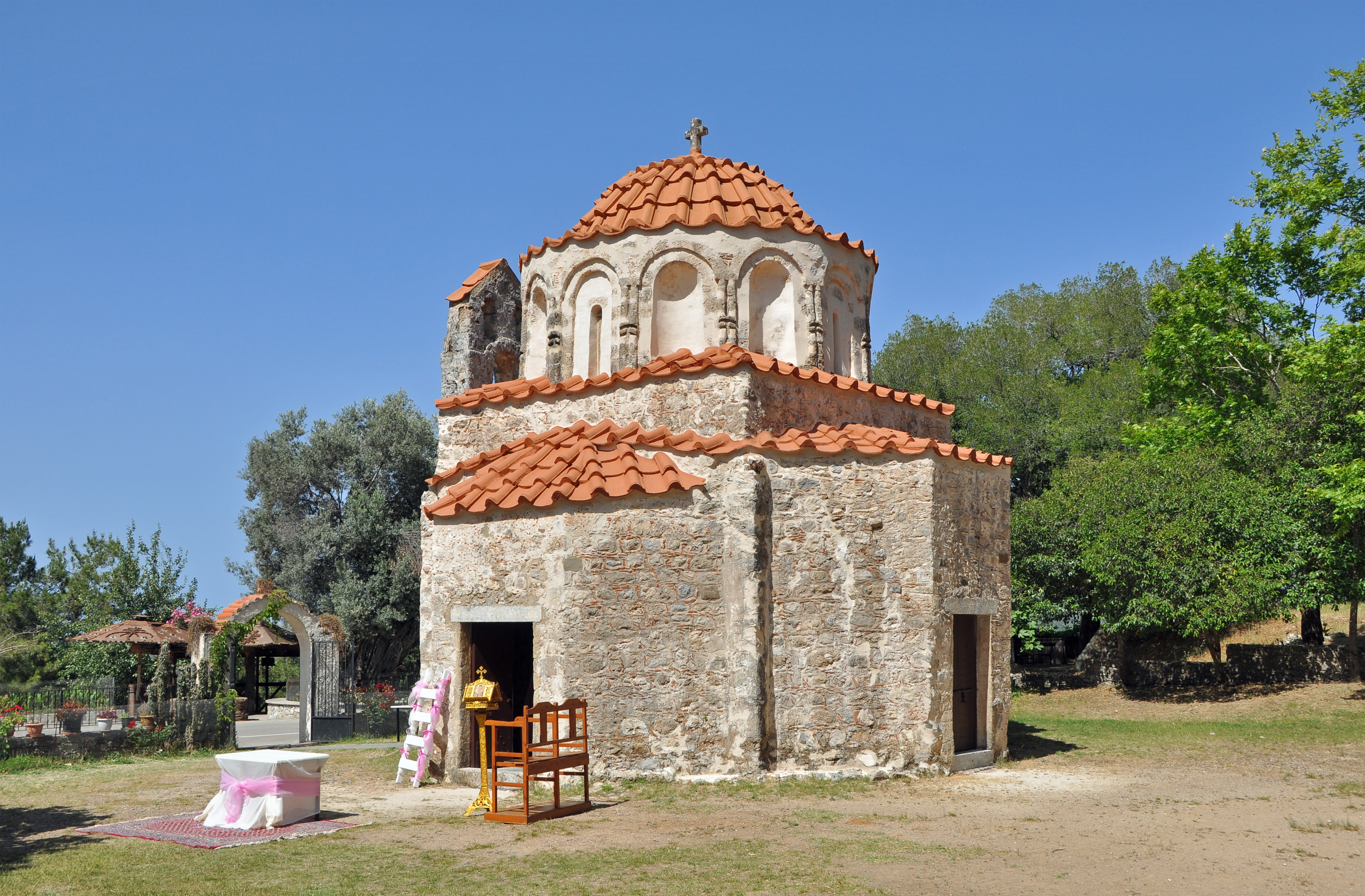
Agios Nikolaos Foundoukli

=== Agios Nikolaos Foundoukli ===
Agios Nikolaos Foundoukli late Byzantine church dedicated to St Nicholas containing 15th century frescoes. It is 2 km. from Eleousa. Around the church are very old olive and Oriental plane trees.

== See also ==
- Mount Attavyros
- Natural history of Rhodes
- Salakos
