= Monastery of Saint Elijah =

Destroyed Christian monastery in Mosul, Iraq

Dair Mar Elia
- ܕܝܪܐ ܕܡܪܝ ܐܝܠܝܐ (Syriac); دير مار إيليا (Arabic)
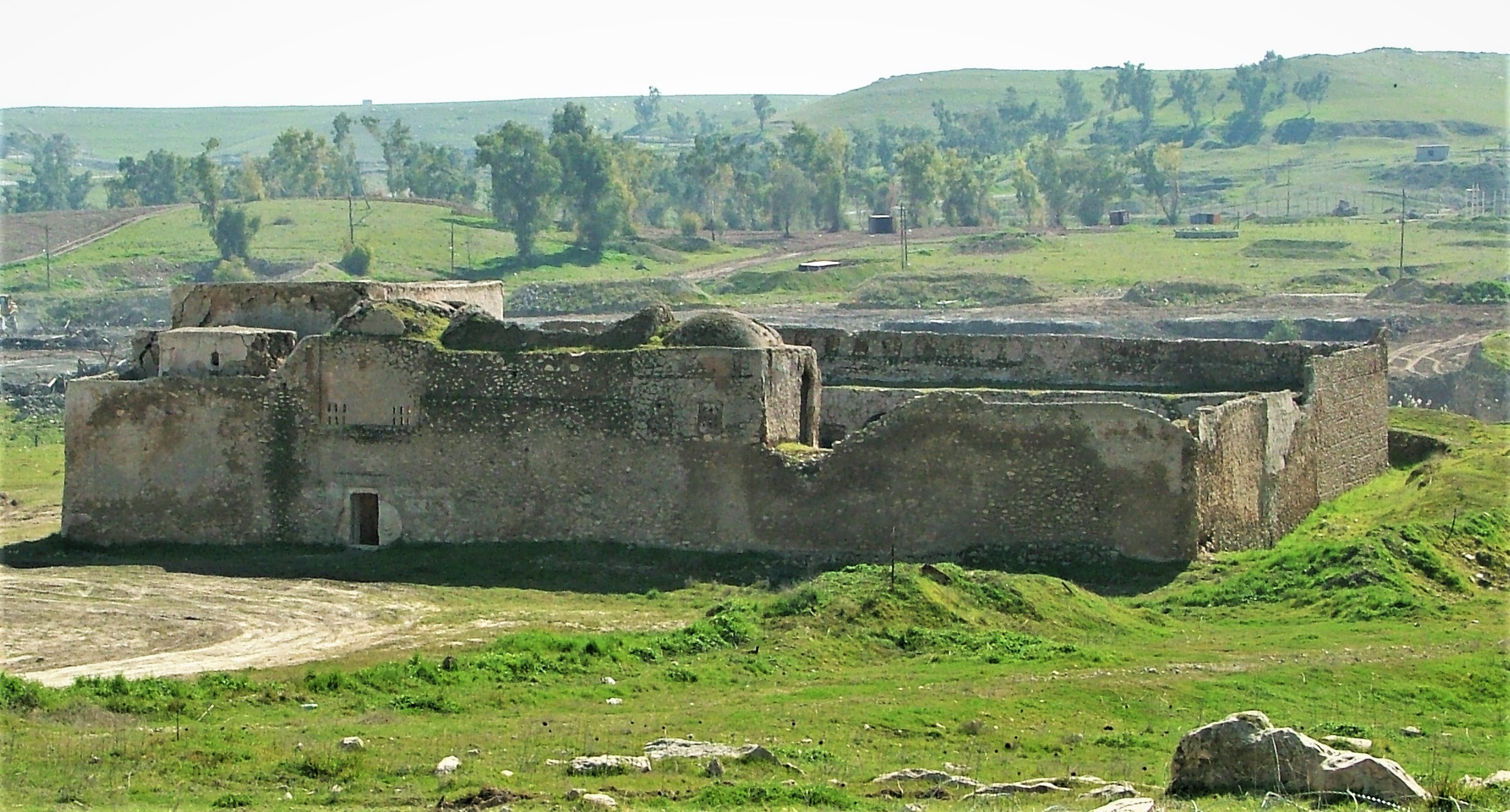
- Ruins of Dair Mar Elia, 2005

- Location within Iraq
- Interactive map of Dair Mar Elia

Monastery information
- Denomination: Church of the East; Chaldean Catholic Church
- Established: 595
- Disestablished: 1743
- Dedication: Saint Elijah of Israel

Architecture
- Status: Destroyed by the Islamic State in 2014

Site
- Location: Near Mosul, Nineveh Governorate
- Country: Republic of Iraq
- Coordinates: 36°17′33″N 43°7′52″E

The Monastery of Saint Elijah, or Dair Mar Elia (Syriac: ܕܝܪܐ ܕܡܪܝ ܐܝܠܝܐ; Arabic: دير مار إيليا), was located in Mosul, Nineveh Governorate, Iraq. Established in the late 6th century, it was one of Iraq's oldest monasteries. It belonged to the Church of the East and then to the Chaldean Catholic Church. The monastery was shut down in 1743, when the Afsharids massacred its monks after they refused to convert to Islam, and went on to become a Christian pilgrimage site. Its ruins were damaged during the 2003 invasion of Iraq, and were destroyed entirely by the Islamic State in 2014.

== Early history ==
=== Founding ===
The monastery was founded around 595 AD by Mar Elia, a monk who had previously studied at al-Hirah and later in the great monastery at Mount Izla in modern-day Turkey. It belonged to the Church of the East. The monastery was the center of the regional Christian community and for centuries thousands of Christians would visit the monastery to observe the Mar Elia Holiday, which falls on the last Wednesday of November.

=== Massacre of monks by the Afsharid army ===
The main sanctuary of the monastery was built in the 11th century, and it was renovated by Hurmizd Alqushnaya in the 17th century. In 1743, Nader Shah of Persia damaged the monastery and killed the 150 monks who lived there, after they refused to convert to Islam.

== Modern history ==
=== As a Christian pilgrimage site ===
The monastery lay in ruins until the beginning of the 20th century, when some restoration was completed on a few halls and rooms. During the First World War, Dair Mar Elia was a place of refuge which led to the rebuilding of part of the site. The structure, along with its neighboring reservoir and natural mineral water springs, were cared for by the Chaldean Catholic Church, and Christian pilgrims continued to visit the ruins. In the 1970s, the monastery became a base for the Iraqi Republican Guard.

=== 2003 invasion of Iraq ===
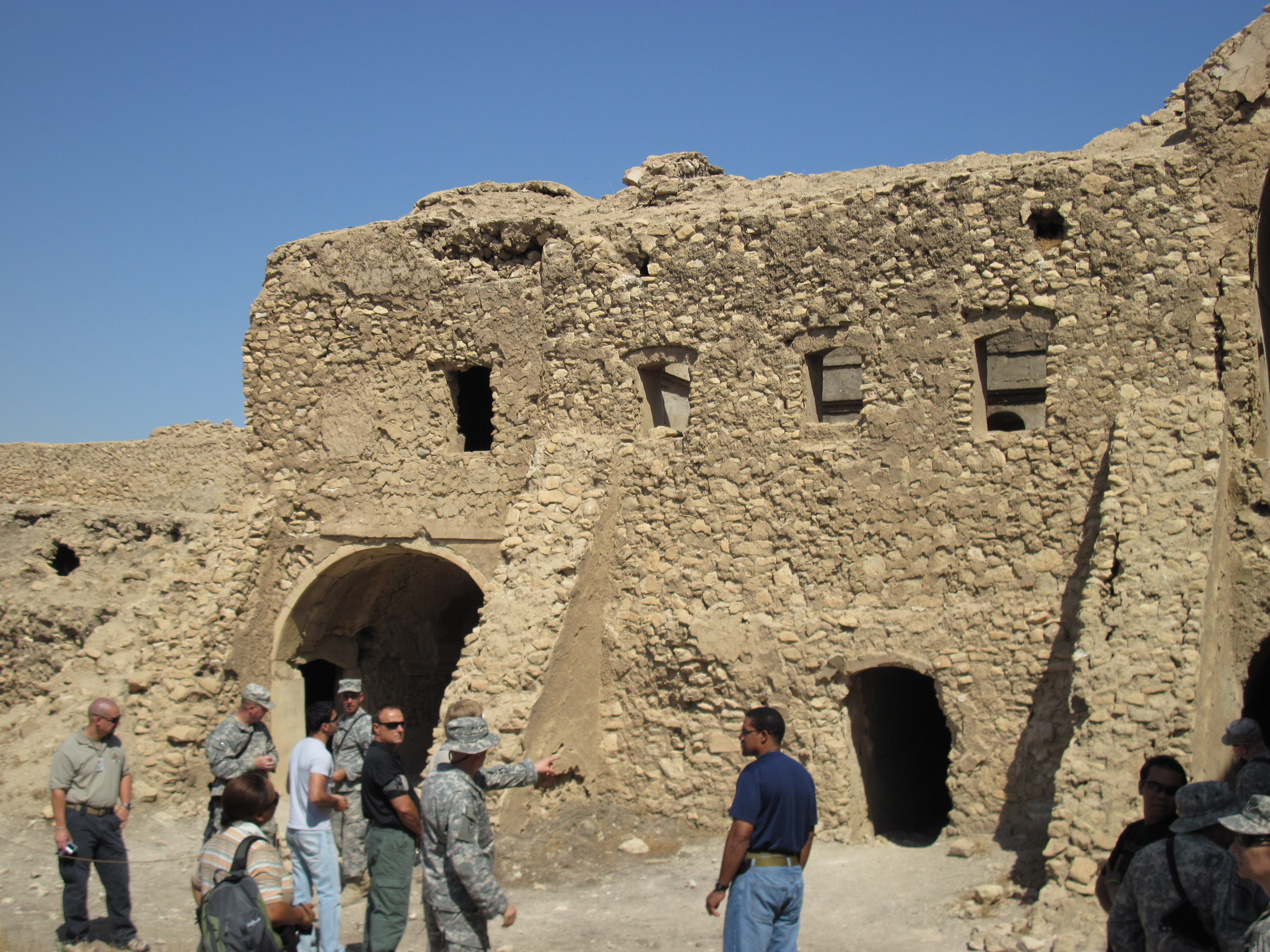
American soldiers touring the monastery in 2009

During the 2003 invasion of Iraq, the monastery was damaged by Iraqi tank units, which trashed rooms and filled a cistern with garbage. One of its walls was destroyed after being hit by a T-72 tank turret. After the 101st Airborne Division took control of the area, the site lay within Forward Operating Base Marez. American soldiers vandalized the monastery by inscribing graffiti on the walls and by whitewashing the chapel, destroying its 600-year-old murals in the process. The structure was further damaged by looters. However, a U.S. military chaplain saw the importance of the site, and a commander ordered troops to vacate the monastery. Eventually, military chaplains began taking care of the structure, and gave tours of the ruins to soldiers.

==== Restoration efforts ====
In May 2008, Iraqi archaeologists were able to visit the areas for the first time since the invasion. Later that year, the U.S. military's efforts to restore Dair Mar Elia were reported in the international media. The journalist James Foley, who was later beheaded by ISIL, wrote that the site was being saved "for future generations of Iraqis who will hopefully soon have the security to appreciate it." Prior to the withdrawal of U.S. troops from Iraq, army engineers from the 94th Corps of Engineers of Fort Leonard Wood drew up plans of the monastery.

=== 2014 destruction by the Islamic State ===
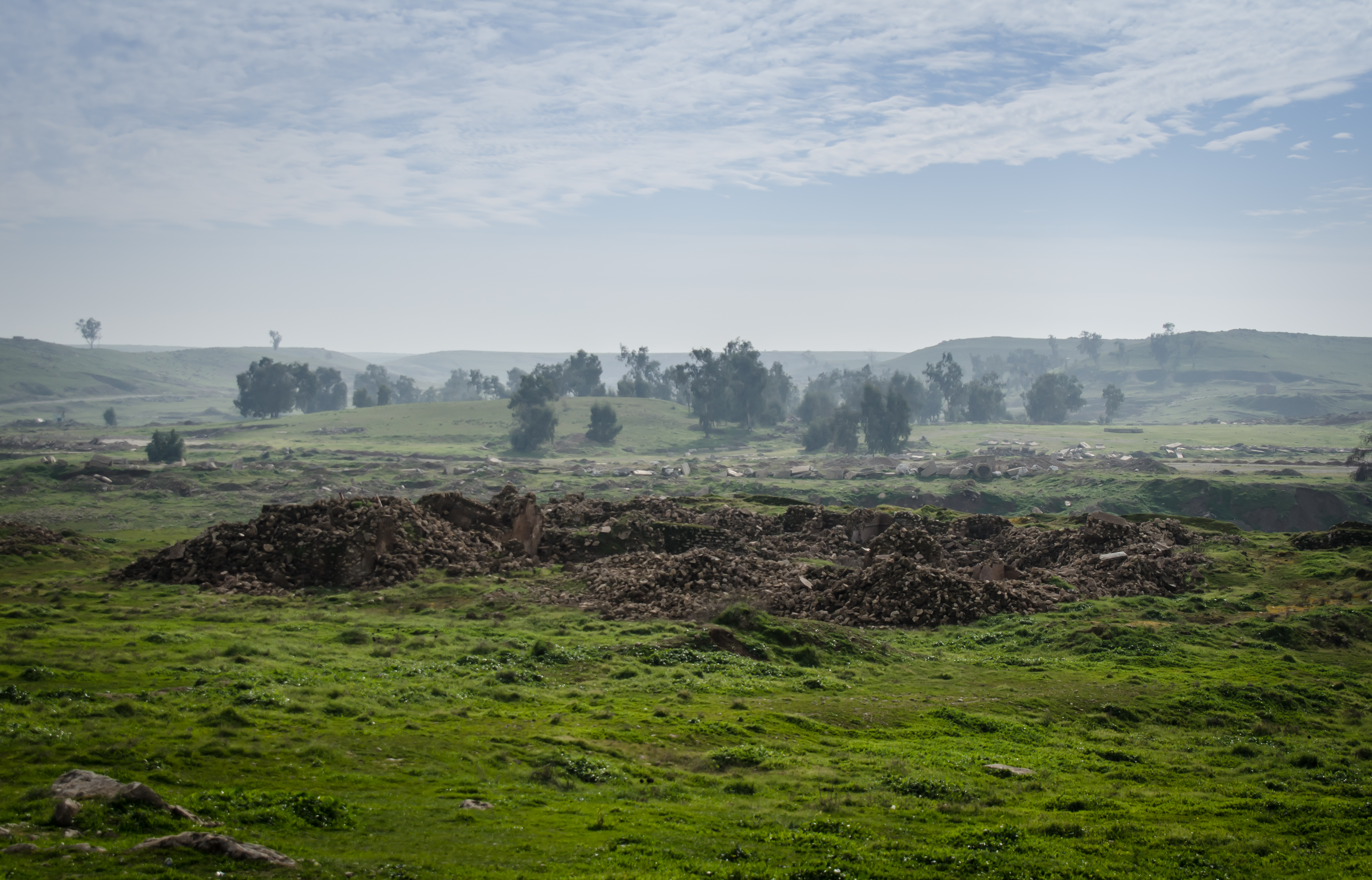
The destroyed monastery in 2019

In June 2014, Mosul was taken over by the Islamic State (IS). The militant group destroyed the monastery sometime between 27 August and 28 September 2014, along with a number of other cultural sites. The destruction of the monastery was not publicized by IS, and it was only confirmed by satellite imagery released in January 2016. The fact that its destruction went unreported for about 16 months led to fears that many other Christian sites in Iraq might have also been destroyed secretly.

== Architecture ==
The monastery consisted of a fortress-like complex of buildings, having an area of around 27,000 square feet (2,500 m^{2}). Before its destruction, it had 26 rooms built around a courtyard, including a chapel and a sanctuary.
