= Elias (disambiguation) =

Elias is a given name and surname, the Greek and Latin form of Elijah.

- Elias (surname)

Elias may also refer to:

== People ==
- Elias (footballer, born 1931), Brazilian football striker Elias Soares de Oliveira
- Elias (footballer, born 1963), Portuguese former football midfielder Fernando Elias Oliveira da Silva
- Elias (singer) (born 1980), French singer-songwriter
- Elias (footballer, born 1985), Brazilian former football midfielder Elias Mendes Trindade
- Elias (footballer, born 1987)
- Elias (footballer, born 1992)
- Elias (footballer, born 1993)
- Elias (footballer, born 1995)
- Elias (footballer, born 1999), Brazilian football right-back, full name Elias Lira Nogueira Júnior
- Elias (Greek scholar), 6th century commentator on Aristotle and Porphyry
- Elias (wrestler), a ring name of American professional wrestler Jeffrey Daniel Sciullo (born 1987)
- Elias Carioca (born 1999), Brazilian football forward

== Arts and entertainment ==
=== Music ===
- Elias, the original German name of Elijah (oratorio), composed by Felix Mendelssohn
- Elias (band), a Swedish music band
- "Elias", a song by Dispatch referring to Elias Sithole of Zimbabwe, a friend of Chad Urmston

=== Other arts and entertainment ===
- Elias (film), a 1991 Dutch film
- Elias: An Epic of the Ages, an American epic poem
- Elias: The Little Rescue Boat, a Norwegian children's book and animated TV series

== Other uses ==
- Elías, Huila, Colombia, a town
- Elias MRT station a future Mass Rapid Transit station in Singapore
- Elias Fund, American nonprofit organization that helps children in Zimbabwe
- Elias Sports Bureau, American company that provides sports statistics and research

== See also ==
- Elias coding (disambiguation), a series of lossless coding schemes used in digital communications
- Saint Elias (disambiguation)
- Elia (disambiguation)
