= Ilyinsky (inhabited locality) =

Ilyinsky (Russian: Ильинский; masculine), Ilyinskaya (Ильинская; feminine), or Ilyinskoye (Ильинское; neuter) is the name of several inhabited localities in Russia.

== Altai Krai ==
As of 2010, one rural locality in Altai Krai bears this name:

- Ilyinsky, Altai Krai, a settlement in Dolgovsky Selsoviet of Novichikhinsky District

== Arkhangelsk Oblast ==
As of 2010, one rural locality in Arkhangelsk Oblast bears this name:

- Ilyinskaya, Arkhangelsk Oblast, a village in Telegovsky Selsoviet of Krasnoborsky District

== Republic of Bashkortostan ==
As of 2010, one rural locality in the Republic of Bashkortostan bears this name:

- Ilyinsky, Republic of Bashkortostan, a village in Udelno-Duvaneysky Selsoviet of Blagoveshchensky District

== Belgorod Oblast ==
As of 2010, one rural locality in Belgorod Oblast bears this name:

- Ilyinsky, Belgorod Oblast, a khutor in Krasnogvardeysky District

== Bryansk Oblast ==
As of 2010, one rural locality in Bryansk Oblast bears this name:

- Ilyinsky, Bryansk Oblast, a settlement in Novopogoshchensky Selsoviet of Suzemsky District

== Ivanovo Oblast ==
As of 2010, ten rural localities in Ivanovo Oblast bear this name:

- Ilyinskoye (selo), Furmanovsky District, Ivanovo Oblast, a selo in Furmanovsky District
- Ilyinskoye (village), Furmanovsky District, Ivanovo Oblast, a village in Furmanovsky District
- Ilyinskoye, Kineshemsky District, Ivanovo Oblast, a selo in Kineshemsky District
- Ilyinskoye, Lukhsky District, Ivanovo Oblast, a village in Lukhsky District
- Ilyinskoye, Puchezhsky District, Ivanovo Oblast, a village in Puchezhsky District
- Ilyinskoye, Shuysky District, Ivanovo Oblast, a selo in Shuysky District
- Ilyinskoye, Teykovsky District, Ivanovo Oblast, a village in Teykovsky District
- Ilyinskoye, Yuryevetsky District, Ivanovo Oblast, a selo in Yuryevetsky District
- Ilyinskoye, Zavolzhsky District, Ivanovo Oblast, a village in Zavolzhsky District
- Ilyinskaya, Ivanovo Oblast, a village in Savinsky District

== Kaliningrad Oblast ==
As of 2010, one rural locality in Kaliningrad Oblast bears this name:

- Ilyinskoye, Kaliningrad Oblast, a settlement in Chistoprudnensky Rural Okrug of Nesterovsky District

== Kaluga Oblast ==
As of 2010, five rural localities in Kaluga Oblast bear this name:

- Ilyinskoye, Kozelsky District, Kaluga Oblast, a selo in Kozelsky District
- Ilyinskoye, Maloyaroslavetsky District, Kaluga Oblast, a selo in Maloyaroslavetsky District
- Ilyinskoye, Peremyshlsky District, Kaluga Oblast, a selo in Peremyshlsky District
- Ilyinskoye, Tarussky District, Kaluga Oblast, a village in Tarussky District
- Ilyinskoye, Zhukovsky District, Kaluga Oblast, a selo in Zhukovsky District

== Republic of Karelia ==
As of 2010, one rural locality in the Republic of Karelia bears this name:

- Ilyinsky, Republic of Karelia, a settlement in Olonetsky District

== Kirov Oblast ==
As of 2010, four rural localities in Kirov Oblast bear this name:

- Ilyinskoye, Falyonsky District, Kirov Oblast, a selo in Petrunensky Rural Okrug of Falyonsky District
- Ilyinskoye, Kirovo-Chepetsky District, Kirov Oblast, a selo in Prosnitsky Rural Okrug of Kirovo-Chepetsky District
- Ilyinskoye, Nemsky District, Kirov Oblast, a selo in Ilyinsky Rural Okrug of Nemsky District
- Ilyinskoye, Slobodskoy District, Kirov Oblast, a selo in Ilyinsky Rural Okrug of Slobodskoy District

== Kostroma Oblast ==
As of 2010, eighteen rural localities in Kostroma Oblast bear this name:

- Ilyinskoye, Antropovsky District, Kostroma Oblast, a village in Kotelnikovskoye Settlement of Antropovsky District
- Ilyinskoye (selo), Tsentralnoye Settlement, Buysky District, Kostroma Oblast, a selo in Tsentralnoye Settlement of Buysky District
- Ilyinskoye (village), Tsentralnoye Settlement, Buysky District, Kostroma Oblast, a village in Tsentralnoye Settlement of Buysky District
- Ilyinskoye, Chukhlomsky District, Kostroma Oblast, a village in Shartanovskoye Settlement of Chukhlomsky District
- Ilyinskoye, Galichsky District, Kostroma Oblast, a village in Dmitriyevskoye Settlement of Galichsky District
- Ilyinskoye, Kadyysky District, Kostroma Oblast, a selo in Yekaterinkinskoye Settlement of Kadyysky District
- Ilyinskoye, Kologrivsky District, Kostroma Oblast, a selo in Ilyinskoye Settlement of Kologrivsky District
- Ilyinskoye, Apraksinskoye Settlement, Kostromskoy District, Kostroma Oblast, a village in Apraksinskoye Settlement of Kostromskoy District
- Ilyinskoye, Samsonovskoye Settlement, Kostromskoy District, Kostroma Oblast, a selo in Samsonovskoye Settlement of Kostromskoy District
- Ilyinskoye, Makaryevsky District, Kostroma Oblast, a village in Knyazhevskoye Settlement of Makaryevsky District
- Ilyinskoye, Volzhskoye Settlement, Nerekhtsky District, Kostroma Oblast, a selo in Volzhskoye Settlement of Nerekhtsky District
- Ilyinskoye, Voskresenskoye Settlement, Nerekhtsky District, Kostroma Oblast, a selo in Voskresenskoye Settlement of Nerekhtsky District
- Ilyinskoye, Oktyabrsky District, Kostroma Oblast, a selo in Starikovskoye Settlement of Oktyabrsky District
- Ilyinskoye, Parfenyevsky District, Kostroma Oblast, a selo in Matveyevskoye Settlement of Parfenyevsky District
- Ilyinskoye, Pyshchugsky District, Kostroma Oblast, a selo in Golovinskoye Settlement of Pyshchugsky District
- Ilyinskoye, Soligalichsky District, Kostroma Oblast, a village in Kortsovskoye Settlement of Soligalichsky District
- Ilyinskoye, Sudislavsky District, Kostroma Oblast, a village in Raslovskoye Settlement of Sudislavsky District
- Ilyinskoye, Susaninsky District, Kostroma Oblast, a selo in Buyakovskoye Settlement of Susaninsky District

== Krasnodar Krai ==
As of 2010, two rural localities in Krasnodar Krai bear this name:

- Ilyinskoye, Krasnodar Krai, a selo in Ilyinsky Rural Okrug of Kushchyovsky District
- Ilyinskaya, Krasnodar Krai, a stanitsa in Ilyinsky Rural Okrug of Novopokrovsky District

== Kurgan Oblast ==
As of 2010, one rural locality in Kurgan Oblast bears this name:

- Ilyinskoye, Kurgan Oblast, a selo in Ilyinsky Selsoviet of Kataysky District

== Kursk Oblast ==
As of 2010, one rural locality in Kursk Oblast bears this name:

- Ilyinsky, Kursk Oblast, a settlement in Volkovsky Selsoviet of Zheleznogorsky District

== Leningrad Oblast ==
As of 2010, one rural locality in Leningrad Oblast bears this name:

- Ilyinskaya, Leningrad Oblast, a village in Vinnitskoye Settlement Municipal Formation of Podporozhsky District

== Mari El Republic ==
As of 2010, two rural localities in the Mari El Republic bear this name:

- Ilyinsky, Morkinsky District, Mari El Republic, a pochinok in Korkatovsky Rural Okrug of Morkinsky District
- Ilyinsky, Sovetsky District, Mari El Republic, a pochinok in Alekseyevsky Rural Okrug of Sovetsky District

== Moscow Oblast ==
As of 2010, thirteen inhabited localities in Moscow Oblast bear this name.

Urban localities

- Ilyinsky, Moscow Oblast, a work settlement in Ramensky District

Rural localities

- Ilyinskoye (selo), Domodedovo, Moscow Oblast, a selo under the administrative jurisdiction of the Domodedovo City Under Oblast Jurisdiction
- Ilyinskoye (village), Domodedovo, Moscow Oblast, a village under the administrative jurisdiction of the Domodedovo City Under Oblast Jurisdiction
- Ilyinskoye, Dmitrovsky District, Moscow Oblast, a selo under the administrative jurisdiction of the Town of Dmitrov in Dmitrovsky District
- Ilyinskoye, Kolomensky District, Moscow Oblast, a village in Biorkovskoye Rural Settlement of Kolomensky District
- Ilyinskoye, Krasnogorsky District, Moscow Oblast, a selo in Ilyinskoye Rural Settlement of Krasnogorsky District
- Ilyinskoye, Lotoshinsky District, Moscow Oblast, a village in Mikulinskoye Rural Settlement of Lotoshinsky District
- Ilyinskoye, Mozhaysky District, Moscow Oblast, a village in Zamoshinskoye Rural Settlement of Mozhaysky District
- Ilyinskoye, Naro-Fominsky District, Moscow Oblast, a village in Veselevskoye Rural Settlement of Naro-Fominsky District
- Ilyinskoye, Ramensky District, Moscow Oblast, a selo in Konstantinovskoye Rural Settlement of Ramensky District
- Ilyinskoye, Ruzsky District, Moscow Oblast, a village in Volkovskoye Rural Settlement of Ruzsky District
- Ilyinskoye, Teryayevskoye Rural Settlement, Volokolamsky District, Moscow Oblast, a selo in Teryayevskoye Rural Settlement of Volokolamsky District
- Ilyinskoye, Yaropoletskoye Rural Settlement, Volokolamsky District, Moscow Oblast, a selo in Yaropoletskoye Rural Settlement of Volokolamsky District

== Nizhny Novgorod Oblast ==
As of 2010, five rural localities in Nizhny Novgorod Oblast bear this name:

- Ilyinsky, Nizhny Novgorod Oblast, a settlement in Nikolo-Pogostinsky Selsoviet of Gorodetsky District
- Ilyinskoye, Bor, Nizhny Novgorod Oblast, a village in Krasnoslobodsky Selsoviet of the city of oblast significance of Bor
- Ilyinskoye, Krasnobakovsky District, Nizhny Novgorod Oblast, a selo in Chashchikhinsky Selsoviet of Krasnobakovsky District
- Ilyinskoye, Pochinkovsky District, Nizhny Novgorod Oblast, a selo in Uzhovsky Selsoviet of Pochinkovsky District
- Ilyinskoye, Sokolsky District, Nizhny Novgorod Oblast, a village in Loyminsky Selsoviet of Sokolsky District

== Novgorod Oblast ==
As of 2010, two rural localities in Novgorod Oblast bear this name:

- Ilyinskoye, Krasnoborskoye Settlement, Kholmsky District, Novgorod Oblast, a village in Krasnoborskoye Settlement of Kholmsky District
- Ilyinskoye, Togodskoye Settlement, Kholmsky District, Novgorod Oblast, a village in Togodskoye Settlement of Kholmsky District

== Oryol Oblast ==
As of 2010, three rural localities in Oryol Oblast bear this name:

- Ilyinsky, Oryol Oblast, a settlement in Studenovsky Selsoviet of Khotynetsky District
- Ilyinskoye, Glazunovsky District, Oryol Oblast, a village in Ochkinsky Selsoviet of Glazunovsky District
- Ilyinskoye, Khotynetsky District, Oryol Oblast, a selo in Ilyinsky Selsoviet of Khotynetsky District

== Perm Krai ==
As of 2010, one rural locality in Perm Krai bears this name:

- Ilyinsky, Perm Krai, a settlement in Ilyinsky District

== Pskov Oblast ==
As of 2010, one rural locality in Pskov Oblast bears this name:

- Ilyinskoye, Pskov Oblast, a village in Krasnogorodsky District

== Rostov Oblast ==
As of 2010, one rural locality in Rostov Oblast bears this name:

- Ilyinsky, Rostov Oblast, a khutor in Ilyinskoye Rural Settlement of Yegorlyksky District

== Ryazan Oblast ==
As of 2010, one rural locality in Ryazan Oblast bears this name:

- Ilyinskoye, Ryazan Oblast, a selo in Kozlovsky Rural Okrug of Rybnovsky District

== Sakhalin Oblast ==
As of 2010, one rural locality in Sakhalin Oblast bears this name:

- Ilyinskoye, Sakhalin Oblast, a selo in Tomarinsky District

== Samara Oblast ==
As of 2010, one rural locality in Samara Oblast bears this name:

- Ilyinsky, Samara Oblast, a settlement in Isaklinsky District

== Sverdlovsk Oblast ==
As of 2010, one rural locality in Sverdlovsk Oblast bears this name:

- Ilyinskoye, Sverdlovsk Oblast, a selo in Bogdanovichsky District

== Republic of Tatarstan ==
As of 2010, three rural localities in the Republic of Tatarstan bear this name:

- Ilyinsky, Republic of Tatarstan, a settlement in Pestrechinsky District
- Ilyinskoye, Tetyushsky District, Republic of Tatarstan, a village in Tetyushsky District
- Ilyinskoye, Zelenodolsky District, Republic of Tatarstan, a selo in Zelenodolsky District

== Tula Oblast ==
As of 2010, one rural locality in Tula Oblast bears this name:

- Ilyinskoye, Tula Oblast, a village in Zhemchuzhnikovskaya Rural Administration of Odoyevsky District

== Tver Oblast ==
As of 2010, ten rural localities in Tver Oblast bear this name:

- Ilyinskoye, Kalininsky District, Tver Oblast, a selo in Kalininsky District
- Ilyinskoye, Kashinsky District, Tver Oblast, a village in Kashinsky District
- Ilyinskoye, Kesovogorsky District, Tver Oblast, a village in Kesovogorsky District
- Ilyinskoye, Kimrsky District, Tver Oblast, a selo in Kimrsky District
- Ilyinskoye, Likhoslavlsky District, Tver Oblast, a selo in Likhoslavlsky District
- Ilyinskoye, Staritsky District, Tver Oblast, a village in Staritsky District
- Ilyinskoye (Romanovskoye Rural Settlement), Vesyegonsky District, Tver Oblast, a village in Vesyegonsky District; municipally, a part of Romanovskoye Rural Settlement of that district
- Ilyinskoye (Kesemskoye Rural Settlement), Vesyegonsky District, Tver Oblast, a village in Vesyegonsky District; municipally, a part of Kesemskoye Rural Settlement of that district
- Ilyinskoye, Vyshnevolotsky District, Tver Oblast, a village in Vyshnevolotsky District
- Ilyinskoye, Zapadnodvinsky District, Tver Oblast, a village in Zapadnodvinsky District

== Udmurt Republic ==
As of 2010, three rural localities in the Udmurt Republic bear this name:

- Ilyinskoye, Alnashsky District, Udmurt Republic, a village in Staroutchansky Selsoviet of Alnashsky District
- Ilyinskoye, Malopurginsky District, Udmurt Republic, a selo in Ilyinsky Selsoviet of Malopurginsky District
- Ilyinskoye, Votkinsky District, Udmurt Republic, a village in Bolshekivarsky Selsoviet of Votkinsky District

== Vladimir Oblast ==
As of 2010, four rural localities in Vladimir Oblast bear this name:

- Ilyinskoye, Kirzhachsky District, Vladimir Oblast, a village in Kirzhachsky District
- Ilyinskoye, Kolchuginsky District, Vladimir Oblast, a selo in Kolchuginsky District
- Ilyinskoye, Selivanovsky District, Vladimir Oblast, a selo in Selivanovsky District
- Ilyinskoye, Yuryev-Polsky District, Vladimir Oblast, a selo in Yuryev-Polsky District

== Vologda Oblast ==
As of 2010, twelve rural localities in Vologda Oblast bear this name:

- Ilyinskoye, Domozerovsky Selsoviet, Cherepovetsky District, Vologda Oblast, a selo in Domozerovsky Selsoviet of Cherepovetsky District
- Ilyinskoye, Ilyinsky Selsoviet, Cherepovetsky District, Vologda Oblast, a selo in Ilyinsky Selsoviet of Cherepovetsky District
- Ilyinskoye, Gryazovetsky District, Vologda Oblast, a village in Sidorovsky Selsoviet of Gryazovetsky District
- Ilyinskoye, Nikolsky District, Vologda Oblast, a village in Argunovsky Selsoviet of Nikolsky District
- Ilyinskoye, Sheksninsky District, Vologda Oblast, a village in Churovsky Selsoviet of Sheksninsky District
- Ilyinskoye, Vashkinsky District, Vologda Oblast, a village in Roksomsky Selsoviet of Vashkinsky District
- Ilyinskoye, Velikoustyugsky District, Vologda Oblast, a selo in Pokrovsky Selsoviet of Velikoustyugsky District
- Ilyinskoye, Oktyabrsky Selsoviet, Vologodsky District, Vologda Oblast, a village in Oktyabrsky Selsoviet of Vologodsky District
- Ilyinskoye, Raboche-Krestyansky Selsoviet, Vologodsky District, Vologda Oblast, a village in Raboche-Krestyansky Selsoviet of Vologodsky District
- Ilyinskoye, Spassky Selsoviet, Vologodsky District, Vologda Oblast, a village in Spassky Selsoviet of Vologodsky District
- Ilyinskaya, Tarnogsky District, Vologda Oblast, a village in Nizhnespassky Selsoviet of Tarnogsky District
- Ilyinskaya, Velikoustyugsky District, Vologda Oblast, a village in Yudinsky Selsoviet of Velikoustyugsky District

== Yaroslavl Oblast ==
As of 2010, twenty-two rural localities in Yaroslavl Oblast bear this name:

- Ilyinskoye, Bolsheselsky District, Yaroslavl Oblast, a village in Chudinovsky Rural Okrug of Bolsheselsky District
- Ilyinskoye, Borisoglebsky District, Yaroslavl Oblast, a selo in Krasnooktyabrsky Rural Okrug of Borisoglebsky District
- Ilyinskoye, Gorinsky Rural Okrug, Danilovsky District, Yaroslavl Oblast, a village in Gorinsky Rural Okrug of Danilovsky District
- Ilyinskoye, Semlovsky Rural Okrug, Danilovsky District, Yaroslavl Oblast, a village in Semlovsky Rural Okrug of Danilovsky District
- Ilyinskoye, Trofimovsky Rural Okrug, Danilovsky District, Yaroslavl Oblast, a village in Trofimovsky Rural Okrug of Danilovsky District
- Ilyinskoye, Nekouzsky Rural Okrug, Nekouzsky District, Yaroslavl Oblast, a village in Nekouzsky Rural Okrug of Nekouzsky District
- Ilyinskoye, Shestikhinsky Rural Okrug, Nekouzsky District, Yaroslavl Oblast, a village in Shestikhinsky Rural Okrug of Nekouzsky District
- Ilyinskoye, Nekrasovsky District, Yaroslavl Oblast, a selo in Grebovsky Rural Okrug of Nekrasovsky District
- Ilyinskoye, Pereslavsky District, Yaroslavl Oblast, a selo in Glebovsky Rural Okrug of Pereslavsky District
- Ilyinskoye, Nikologorsky Rural Okrug, Pervomaysky District, Yaroslavl Oblast, a village in Nikologorsky Rural Okrug of Pervomaysky District
- Ilyinskoye, Prechistensky Rural Okrug, Pervomaysky District, Yaroslavl Oblast, a selo in Prechistensky Rural Okrug of Pervomaysky District
- Ilyinskoye, Beloselsky Rural Okrug, Poshekhonsky District, Yaroslavl Oblast, a selo in Beloselsky Rural Okrug of Poshekhonsky District
- Ilyinskoye, Leninsky Rural Okrug, Poshekhonsky District, Yaroslavl Oblast, a village in Leninsky Rural Okrug of Poshekhonsky District
- Ilyinskoye, Voshchikovsky Rural Okrug, Poshekhonsky District, Yaroslavl Oblast, a village in Voshchikovsky Rural Okrug of Poshekhonsky District
- Ilyinskoye, Lomovsky Rural Okrug, Rybinsky District, Yaroslavl Oblast, a village in Lomovsky Rural Okrug of Rybinsky District
- Ilyinskoye, Oktyabrsky Rural Okrug, Rybinsky District, Yaroslavl Oblast, a village in Oktyabrsky Rural Okrug of Rybinsky District
- Ilyinskoye, Artemyevsky Rural Okrug, Tutayevsky District, Yaroslavl Oblast, a village in Artemyevsky Rural Okrug of Tutayevsky District
- Ilyinskoye, Rodionovsky Rural Okrug, Tutayevsky District, Yaroslavl Oblast, a selo in Rodionovsky Rural Okrug of Tutayevsky District
- Ilyinskoye, Ilyinsky Rural Okrug, Uglichsky District, Yaroslavl Oblast, a selo in Ilyinsky Rural Okrug of Uglichsky District
- Ilyinskoye, Klimatinsky Rural Okrug, Uglichsky District, Yaroslavl Oblast, a village in Klimatinsky Rural Okrug of Uglichsky District
- Ilyinskoye, Pestretsovsky Rural Okrug, Yaroslavsky District, Yaroslavl Oblast, a village in Pestretsovsky Rural Okrug of Yaroslavsky District
- Ilyinskoye, Tochishchensky Rural Okrug, Yaroslavsky District, Yaroslavl Oblast, a village in Tochishchensky Rural Okrug of Yaroslavsky District

== See also ==
- Khutor Ilyinsky, a village in Orlovsky District of Oryol Oblast
- sovkhoza "Ilyinsky", a settlement in Olonetsky District of the Republic of Karelia, Russia
- Ilya (disambiguation)
- Ilyin
- Ilyino
- Ilyinka
