= Ilyinka =

Ilyinka (Russian: Ильинка) is the name of several inhabited localities in Russia.

== Modern localities ==
=== Altai Krai ===
As of 2012, two rural localities in Altai Krai bear this name:

- Ilyinka, Shelabolikhinsky District, Altai Krai, a selo in Ilyinsky Selsoviet of Shelabolikhinsky District; 53°28′N 82°20′E
- Ilyinka, Shipunovsky District, Altai Krai, a selo in Ilyinsky Selsoviet of Shipunovsky District; 51°57′N 82°22′E

=== Altai Republic ===
As of 2012, one rural locality in the Altai Republic bears this name:

- Ilyinka, Altai Republic, a selo in Ilyinskoye Rural Settlement of Shebalinsky District; 51°27′N 85°6′E

=== Astrakhan Oblast ===
As of 2012, two inhabited localities in Astrakhan Oblast bear this name:

Urban localities

- Ilyinka, Ikryaninsky District, Astrakhan Oblast, a work settlement in Ikryaninsky District; 46°14′N 47°54′E

Rural localities

- Ilyinka, Volodarsky District, Astrakhan Oblast, a selo in Bolshemogoysky Selsoviet of Volodarsky District; 46°22′N 48°39′E

=== Republic of Bashkortostan ===
As of 2012, two rural localities in the Republic of Bashkortostan bear this name:

- Ilyinka, Blagovarsky District, Republic of Bashkortostan, a village in Blagovarsky Selsoviet of Blagovarsky District; 54°36′N 54°58′E
- Ilyinka, Uchalinsky District, Republic of Bashkortostan, a village in Mansurovsky Selsoviet of Uchalinsky District

=== Belgorod Oblast ===
As of 2012, two rural localities in Belgorod Oblast bear this name:

- Ilyinka, Alexeyevsky District, Belgorod Oblast, a selo in Alexeyevsky District
- Ilyinka, Gubkinsky District, Belgorod Oblast, a khutor in Gubkinsky District

=== Bryansk Oblast ===
As of 2012, one rural locality in Bryansk Oblast bears this name:

- Ilyinka, Bryansk Oblast, a settlement in Degtyarevsky Rural Administrative Okrug of Surazhsky District; 53°15′N 32°44′E

=== Republic of Buryatia ===
As of 2012, one rural locality in the Republic of Buryatia bears this name:

- Ilyinka, Republic of Buryatia, a selo in Ilyinsky Selsoviet of Pribaykalsky District

=== Chelyabinsk Oblast ===
As of 2012, one rural locality in Chelyabinsk Oblast bears this name:

- Ilyinka, Chelyabinsk Oblast, a settlement in Granitny Selsoviet of Kizilsky District

=== Chuvash Republic ===
As of 2012, one rural locality in the Chuvash Republic bears this name:

- Ilyinka, Chuvash Republic, a selo in Ilyinskoye Rural Settlement of Morgaushsky District

=== Republic of Crimea ===
As of 2012, two rural localities in Republic of Crimea bear this name:

- Ilyinka, Krasnoperekopsky District, Republic of Crimea, a selo in Krasnoperekopsky District
- Ilyinka, Saksky District, Republic of Crimea, a selo in Saksky District

=== Kaluga Oblast ===
As of 2012, six rural localities in Kaluga Oblast bear this name:

- Ilyinka, Kaluga, Kaluga Oblast, a village under the administrative jurisdiction of the City of Kaluga
- Ilyinka, Khvastovichsky District, Kaluga Oblast, a selo in Khvastovichsky District
- Ilyinka (Peredel Rural Settlement), Medynsky District, Kaluga Oblast, a village in Medynsky District; municipally, a part of Peredel Rural Settlement of that district
- Ilyinka (Kremenskoye Rural Settlement), Medynsky District, Kaluga Oblast, a village in Medynsky District; municipally, a part of Kremenskoye Rural Settlement of that district
- Ilyinka, Meshchovsky District, Kaluga Oblast, a village in Meshchovsky District
- Ilyinka, Peremyshlsky District, Kaluga Oblast, a selo in Peremyshlsky District

=== Kemerovo Oblast ===
As of 2012, two rural localities in Kemerovo Oblast bear this name:

- Ilyinka, Mezhdurechensky District, Kemerovo Oblast, a settlement in Mezhdurechensky District; 53°9′N 88°43′E
- Ilyinka, Novokuznetsky District, Kemerovo Oblast, a selo in Ilyinskaya Rural Territory of Novokuznetsky District; 53°53′N 87°9′E

=== Khabarovsk Krai ===
As of 2012, one rural locality in Khabarovsk Krai bears this name:

- Ilyinka, Khabarovsk Krai, a selo in Khabarovsky District

=== Kirov Oblast ===
As of 2012, one rural locality in Kirov Oblast bears this name:

- Ilyinka, Kirov Oblast, a village in Shkalansky Rural Okrug of Yaransky District; 57°3′N 47°58′E

=== Kostroma Oblast ===
As of 2012, one rural locality in Kostroma Oblast bears this name:

- Ilyinka, Kostroma Oblast, a village in Georgiyevskoye Settlement of Mezhevskoy District; 58°54′N 45°11′E

=== Krasnoyarsk Krai ===
As of 2012, seven rural localities in Krasnoyarsk Krai bear this name:

- Ilyinka, Achinsky District, Krasnoyarsk Krai, a village in Malinovsky Selsoviet of Achinsky District
- Ilyinka, Bogotolsky District, Krasnoyarsk Krai, a village in Vaginsky Selsoviet of Bogotolsky District
- Ilyinka, Kuraginsky District, Krasnoyarsk Krai, a village in Shalobolinsky Selsoviet of Kuraginsky District
- Ilyinka, Nazarovsky District, Krasnoyarsk Krai, a selo in Preobrazhensky Selsoviet of Nazarovsky District
- Ilyinka, Alexandrovsky Selsoviet, Nizhneingashsky District, Krasnoyarsk Krai, a village in Alexandrovsky Selsoviet of Nizhneingashsky District
- Ilyinka, Stretensky Selsoviet, Nizhneingashsky District, Krasnoyarsk Krai, a village in Stretensky Selsoviet of Nizhneingashsky District
- Ilyinka, Uzhursky District, Krasnoyarsk Krai, a selo in Ilyinsky Selsoviet of Uzhursky District

=== Kurgan Oblast ===
As of 2012, one rural locality in Kurgan Oblast bears this name:

- Ilyinka, Kurgan Oblast, a village under the administrative jurisdiction of the urban-type settlement under district jurisdiction of Yurgamysh in Yurgamyshsky District; 55°21′N 64°28′E

=== Kursk Oblast ===
As of 2012, one rural locality in Kursk Oblast bears this name:

- Ilyinka, Kursk Oblast, a selo in Donsemitsky Selsoviet of Pristensky District

=== Lipetsk Oblast ===
As of 2012, six rural localities in Lipetsk Oblast bear this name:

- Ilyinka, Dankovsky District, Lipetsk Oblast, a village in Speshnevo-Ivanovsky Selsoviet of Dankovsky District; 53°16′N 38°48′E
- Ilyinka, Dolgorukovsky Selsoviet, Dolgorukovsky District, Lipetsk Oblast, a village in Dolgorukovsky Selsoviet of Dolgorukovsky District; 52°20′N 38°22′E
- Ilyinka, Svishensky Selsoviet, Dolgorukovsky District, Lipetsk Oblast, a village in Svishensky Selsoviet of Dolgorukovsky District; 52°29′N 38°15′E
- Ilyinka, Krasninsky District, Lipetsk Oblast, a village in Krasninsky Selsoviet of Krasninsky District; 52°53′N 38°43′E
- Ilyinka, Lev-Tolstovsky District, Lipetsk Oblast, a selo in Novochemodanovsky Selsoviet of Lev-Tolstovsky District; 53°14′N 39°37′E
- Ilyinka, Yeletsky District, Lipetsk Oblast, a village in Maloboyevsky Selsoviet of Yeletsky District; 52°27′N 38°35′E

=== Mari El Republic ===
As of 2012, two rural localities in the Mari El Republic bear this name:

- Ilyinka, Markovsky Rural Okrug, Orshansky District, Mari El Republic, a village in Markovsky Rural Okrug of Orshansky District; 56°48′N 47°57′E
- Ilyinka, Velikopolsky Rural Okrug, Orshansky District, Mari El Republic, a settlement in Velikopolsky Rural Okrug of Orshansky District; 56°47′N 47°56′E

=== Nizhny Novgorod Oblast ===
As of 2012, four rural localities in Nizhny Novgorod Oblast bear this name:

- Ilyinka, Chkalovsky District, Nizhny Novgorod Oblast, a village in Purekhovsky Selsoviet of Chkalovsky District; 56°36′N 43°3′E
- Ilyinka, Sechenovsky District, Nizhny Novgorod Oblast, a selo in Boltinsky Selsoviet of Sechenovsky District; 55°15′N 45°48′E
- Ilyinka (settlement), Sokolsky District, Nizhny Novgorod Oblast, a settlement in Volzhsky Selsoviet of Sokolsky District; 57°23′N 43°45′E
- Ilyinka (village), Sokolsky District, Nizhny Novgorod Oblast, a village in Volzhsky Selsoviet of Sokolsky District; 57°23′N 43°47′E

=== Novosibirsk Oblast ===
As of 2012, three rural localities in Novosibirsk Oblast bear this name:

- Ilyinka, Dovolensky District, Novosibirsk Oblast, a selo in Dovolensky District; 54°31′N 79°14′E
- Ilyinka, Kuybyshevsky District, Novosibirsk Oblast, a settlement in Kuybyshevsky District; 55°30′N 79°11′E
- Ilyinka, Vengerovsky District, Novosibirsk Oblast, a village in Vengerovsky District; 55°47′N 76°33′E

=== Omsk Oblast ===
As of 2012, one rural locality in Omsk Oblast bears this name:

- Ilyinka, Omsk Oblast, a village in Nikolsky Rural Okrug of Tyukalinsky District; 55°39′N 72°25′E

=== Orenburg Oblast ===
As of 2012, two rural localities in Orenburg Oblast bear this name:

- Ilyinka, Kuvandyksky District, Orenburg Oblast, a selo in Ilyinsky Selsoviet of Kuvandyksky District
- Ilyinka, Oktyabrsky District, Orenburg Oblast, a selo in Ilyinsky Selsoviet of Oktyabrsky District

=== Oryol Oblast ===
As of 2012, one rural locality in Oryol Oblast bears this name:

- Ilyinka, Oryol Oblast, a village in Vasilyevsky Selsoviet of Verkhovsky District; 52°44′N 37°20′E

=== Primorsky Krai ===
As of 2012, two rural localities in Khankaysky District of Primorsky Krai bear this name:

- Ilyinka (railway station), a railway station
- Ilyinka (selo), a selo

=== Rostov Oblast ===
As of 2012, one rural locality in Rostov Oblast bears this name:

- Ilyinka, Rostov Oblast, a khutor in Ilyinskoye Rural Settlement of Belokalitvinsky District; 48°33′N 41°5′E

=== Ryazan Oblast ===
As of 2012, one rural locality in Ryazan Oblast bears this name:

- Ilyinka, Ryazan Oblast, a selo in Ilyinsky Rural Okrug of Skopinsky District

=== Samara Oblast ===
As of 2012, one rural locality in Samara Oblast bears this name:

- Ilyinka, Samara Oblast, a settlement in Krasnoyarsky District

=== Saratov Oblast ===
As of 2012, three rural localities in Saratov Oblast bear this name:

- Ilyinka, Dergachyovsky District, Saratov Oblast, a settlement in Dergachyovsky District
- Ilyinka, Krasnokutsky District, Saratov Oblast, a selo in Krasnokutsky District
- Ilyinka, Turkovsky District, Saratov Oblast, a selo in Turkovsky District

=== Smolensk Oblast ===
As of 2012, one rural locality in Smolensk Oblast bears this name:

- Ilyinka, Smolensk Oblast, a village in Snegirevskoye Rural Settlement of Shumyachsky District

=== Tambov Oblast ===
As of 2012, two rural localities in Tambov Oblast bear this name:

- Ilyinka, Umyotsky District, Tambov Oblast, a village in Sergiyevsky Selsoviet of Umyotsky District
- Ilyinka, Znamensky District, Tambov Oblast, a village in Pokrovo-Marfinsky Selsoviet of Znamensky District

=== Republic of Tatarstan ===
As of 2012, one rural locality in the Republic of Tatarstan bears this name:

- Ilyinka, Republic of Tatarstan, a village under the administrative jurisdiction of the city of republic significance of Nizhnekamsk

=== Tula Oblast ===
As of 2012, five rural localities in Tula Oblast bear this name:

- Ilyinka, Arsenyevsky District, Tula Oblast, a village in Bobrovsky Rural Okrug of Arsenyevsky District
- Ilyinka, Chernsky District, Tula Oblast, a village in Bolsheskuratovskaya Rural Administration of Chernsky District
- Ilyinka, Leninsky District, Tula Oblast, a settlement in Ilyinsky Rural Okrug of Leninsky District
- Ilyinka, Uzlovsky District, Tula Oblast, a selo in Akimo-Ilyinskaya Rural Administration of Uzlovsky District
- Ilyinka, Venyovsky District, Tula Oblast, a village in Mordvessky Rural Okrug of Venyovsky District

=== Tuva Republic ===
As of 2012, one rural locality in the Tuva Republic bears this name:

- Ilyinka, Tuva Republic, a selo in Ilyinka Sumon (Rural Settlement) of Kaa-Khemsky District

=== Tver Oblast ===
As of 2012, one rural locality in Tver Oblast bears this name:

- Ilyinka, Tver Oblast, a village in Kiverichi Rural Settlement of Rameshkovsky District

=== Tyumen Oblast ===
As of 2012, one rural locality in Tyumen Oblast bears this name:

- Ilyinka, Tyumen Oblast, a selo in Ilyinsky Rural Okrug of Kazansky District

=== Voronezh Oblast ===
As of 2012, two rural localities in Voronezh Oblast bear this name:

- Ilyinka, Kalacheyevsky District, Voronezh Oblast, a selo in Podgorenskoye Rural Settlement of Kalacheyevsky District
- Ilyinka, Talovsky District, Voronezh Oblast, a settlement in Kazanskoye Rural Settlement of Talovsky District

=== Yaroslavl Oblast ===
As of 2012, one rural locality in Yaroslavl Oblast bears this name:

- Ilyinka, Yaroslavl Oblast, a village in Ryazantsevsky Rural Okrug of Pereslavsky District

=== Zabaykalsky Krai ===
As of 2012, one rural locality in Zabaykalsky Krai bears this name:

- Ilyinka, Zabaykalsky Krai, a selo in Chitinsky District

== Alternative names ==
- Ilyinka, alternative name of Ilyinki, a village in Lozovskoye Rural Settlement of Sergiyevo-Posadsky District in Moscow Oblast; 56°17′N 38°15′E
- Ilyinka, alternative name of Ilyinskoye, a selo in Ilyinsky Rural Okrug of Kushchyovsky District in Krasnodar Krai; 46°41′N 39°50′E
- Ilyinka, alternative name of Ilyinskoye, a selo in Ilyinsky Selsoviet of Kataysky District in Kurgan Oblast; 56°16′N 62°35′E
- Ilyinka, alternative name of Nizhnyaya Ilyinka, a village in Krasnoyarsky Rural Okrug of Omsky District in Omsk Oblast; 55°23′N 73°14′E
- Ilyinka, alternative name of Zelenaya, a village in Talbakulsky Rural Okrug of Kolosovsky District in Omsk Oblast; 56°21′N 73°9′E

== See also ==
- Ilya (disambiguation)
- Ilyin
- Ilyino
- Ilyinsky (inhabited locality)
