= Ilyinsky =

Ilyinsky (masculine), Ilyinskaya (feminine), or Ilyinskoye (neuter) may refer to:

- Ilyinsky (surname) (Ilyinskaya)

== Places ==
- Ilyinsky District, several districts in Russia
- Ilyinsky Urban Settlement, a municipal formation which the Work Settlement of Ilyinsky in Ramensky District of Moscow Oblast is incorporated as
- Ilyinskoye Urban Settlement, a municipal formation which the settlement of Ilyinskoye-Khovanskoye and nineteen rural localities in Ilyinsky District of Ivanovo Oblast are incorporated as
- Ilyinsky (inhabited locality) (Ilyinskaya, Ilyinskoye), several inhabited localities in Russia
- Ilyinsky (volcano), a volcano on the Kamchatka Peninsula

== See also ==
- Ilya (disambiguation)
- Ilyin
- Ilyino
- Ilyinka
