= Rozhnovo =

Rozhnovo (Russian: Рожново) is the name of several rural localities in Russia.

== Modern localities ==
- Rozhnovo, Ilyinsky District, Ivanovo Oblast, a village in Ilyinsky District of Ivanovo Oblast
- Rozhnovo, Ivanovsky District, Ivanovo Oblast, a village in Ivanovsky District of Ivanovo Oblast
- Rozhnovo, Galichsky District, Kostroma Oblast, a village in Berezovskoye Settlement of Galichsky District in Kostroma Oblast; 58°38′N 42°17′E
- Rozhnovo, Nerekhtsky District, Kostroma Oblast, a village in Volzhskoye Settlement of Nerekhtsky District in Kostroma Oblast; 57°32′N 40°51′E
- Rozhnovo, Moscow, a village in Pervomayskoye Settlement of Troitsky Administrative Okrug of the federal city of Moscow
- Rozhnovo, Istrinsky District, Moscow Oblast, a village in Luchinskoye Rural Settlement of Istrinsky District in Moscow Oblast
- Rozhnovo, Zaraysky District, Moscow Oblast, a village in Karinskoye Rural Settlement of Zaraysky District in Moscow Oblast
- Rozhnovo, Nizhny Novgorod Oblast, a village in Redkinsky Selsoviet under the administrative jurisdiction of the town of oblast significance of Bor in Nizhny Novgorod Oblast
- Rozhnovo (Alexeyevskaya Rural Settlement), Loknyansky District, Pskov Oblast, a village in Loknyansky District of Pskov Oblast; municipally, a part of Alexeyevskaya Rural Settlement of that district
- Rozhnovo (Loknyanskaya Rural Settlement), Loknyansky District, Pskov Oblast, a village in Loknyansky District of Pskov Oblast; municipally, a part of Loknyanskaya Rural Settlement of that district
- Rozhnovo (Ust-Dolysskaya Rural Settlement), Nevelsky District, Pskov Oblast, a village in Nevelsky District of Pskov Oblast; municipally, a part of Ust-Dolysskaya Rural Settlement of that district
- Rozhnovo (Turichinskaya Rural Settlement), Nevelsky District, Pskov Oblast, a village in Nevelsky District of Pskov Oblast; municipally, a part of Turichinskaya Rural Settlement of that district
- Rozhnovo, Novosokolnichesky District, Pskov Oblast, a village in Novosokolnichesky District of Pskov Oblast
- Rozhnovo, Opochetsky District, Pskov Oblast, a village in Opochetsky District of Pskov Oblast
- Rozhnovo, Smolensk Oblast, a village in Losnenskoye Rural Settlement of Pochinkovsky District in Smolensk Oblast
- Rozhnovo, Kimrsky District, Tver Oblast, a village in Goritskoye Rural Settlement of Kimrsky District in Tver Oblast
- Rozhnovo, Toropetsky District, Tver Oblast, a village in Kudryavtsevskoye Rural Settlement of Toropetsky District in Tver Oblast
- Rozhnovo, Torzhoksky District, Tver Oblast, a village in Sukromlenskoye Rural Settlement of Torzhoksky District in Tver Oblast
- Rozhnovo, Vladimir Oblast, a village in Muromsky District of Vladimir Oblast

== Abolished localities ==
- Rozhnovo, Buysky District, Kostroma Oblast, a village in Kaplinsky Selsoviet of Buysky District of Kostroma Oblast; abolished on August 30, 2004
