= Pochepalovo =

Pochepalovo Почепалово
- Village
- Location within Ivanovo Oblast Location within Russia
- Coordinates: 56°47′N 39°27′E
- Country: Russia
- Region: Ivanovo Oblast
- District: Ilyinsky District
- Time zone: UTC+3:00

Pochepalovo (Russian: Почепалово) is a rural locality (a village) in Ilyinsky District, Ivanovo Oblast, Russia. Population: 23 (2010 census);

== Geography ==
This rural locality is located 27 kilometres (17 mi) from Ilyinskoye-Khovanskoye (the district's administrative centre), 94 kilometres (58 mi) from Ivanovo (capital of Ivanovo Oblast) and 161 kilometres (100 mi) from Moscow. Arsenovo is the nearest rural locality.
