= Shiryayevo, Ilyinsky District, Ivanovo Oblast =

Shiryayevo Ширяево
- Village
- Location within Ivanovo Oblast Location within Russia
- Coordinates: 56°57′N 39°44′E
- Country: Russia
- Region: Ivanovo Oblast
- District: Ilyinsky District
- Time zone: UTC+3:00

Shiryayevo (Russian: Ширяево) is a rural locality (a village) in Ilyinsky District, Ivanovo Oblast, Russia. Population: 50 (2010 census);

== Geography ==
This rural locality is located 2 kilometres (1.2 mi) from Ilyinskoye-Khovanskoye (the district's administrative centre), 75 kilometres (47 mi) from Ivanovo (capital of Ivanovo Oblast) and 186 kilometres (116 mi) from Moscow. Shishkino is the nearest rural locality.
