= Goryashino =

Goryashino Горяшино
- Village
- Location within Ivanovo Oblast Location within Russia
- Coordinates: 56°52′N 39°32′E
- Country: Russia
- Region: Ivanovo Oblast
- District: Ilyinsky District
- Time zone: UTC+3:00

Goryashino (Russian: Горяшино) is a rural locality (a village) in Ilyinsky District, Ivanovo Oblast, Russia. Population: 7 (2010 census);

== Geography ==
This rural locality is located 17 kilometres (11 mi) from Ilyinskoye-Khovanskoye (the district's administrative centre), 88 kilometres (55 mi) from Ivanovo (capital of Ivanovo Oblast) and 171 kilometres (106 mi) from Moscow. Brodovoye is the nearest rural locality.
