= Nazornoye =

Nazornoye Назорное
- Selo
- Location within Ivanovo Oblast Location within Russia
- Coordinates: 56°59′N 39°48′E
- Country: Russia
- Region: Ivanovo Oblast
- District: Ilyinsky District
- Time zone: UTC+3:00

Nazornoye (Russian: Назорное) is a rural locality (a selo) in Ilyinsky District, Ivanovo Oblast, Russia. Population: 44 (2010 census);

== Geography ==
This rural locality is located 3 kilometres (1.9 mi) from Ilyinskoye-Khovanskoye (the district's administrative centre), 71 kilometres (44 mi) from Ivanovo (capital of Ivanovo Oblast) and 191 kilometres (119 mi) from Moscow. Fedorovskoye is the nearest rural locality.
