= Rakshino =

Rakshino Ракшино
- Village
- Location within Ivanovo Oblast Location within Russia
- Coordinates: 57°07′N 40°00′E
- Country: Russia
- Region: Ivanovo Oblast
- District: Ilyinsky District
- Time zone: UTC+3:00

Rakshino (Russian: Ракшино) is a rural locality (a village) in Ilyinsky District, Ivanovo Oblast, Russia. Population: 20 (2010 census);

== Geography ==
This rural locality is located 22 kilometres (14 mi) from Ilyinskoye-Khovanskoye (the district's administrative centre), 60 kilometres (37 mi) from Ivanovo (capital of Ivanovo Oblast) and 209 kilometres (130 mi) from Moscow. Sidorovo is the nearest rural locality.
