= Yakshino, Ilyinsky District, Ivanovo Oblast =

Yakshino Якшино
- Village
- Location within Ivanovo Oblast Location within Russia
- Coordinates: 57°06′N 39°53′E
- Country: Russia
- Region: Ivanovo Oblast
- District: Ilyinsky District
- Time zone: UTC+3:00

Yakshino (Russian: Якшино) is a rural locality (a village) in Ilyinsky District, Ivanovo Oblast, Russia. Population: 13 (2010 census);

== Geography ==
This rural locality is located 17 kilometres (11 mi) from Ilyinskoye-Khovanskoye (the district's administrative centre), 66 kilometres (41 mi) from Ivanovo (capital of Ivanovo Oblast) and 203 kilometres (126 mi) from Moscow. Marino is the nearest rural locality.
