= Pogost Krest =

Pogost Krest Погост Крест
- Village
- Location within Ivanovo Oblast Location within Russia
- Coordinates: 56°56′N 39°31′E
- Country: Russia
- Region: Ivanovo Oblast
- District: Ilyinsky District
- Time zone: UTC+3:00

Pogost Krest (Russian: Погост Крест) is a rural locality (a selo) in Ilyinsky District, Ivanovo Oblast, Russia. Population: 16 (2010 census);

== Geography ==
This rural locality is located 15 kilometres (9.3 mi) from Ilyinskoye-Khovanskoye (the district's administrative centre), 88 kilometres (55 mi) from Ivanovo (capital of Ivanovo Oblast) and 175 kilometres (109 mi) from Moscow. Krestopoklonnaya is the nearest rural locality.
