= Telyakovo, Ivanovo Oblast =

Telyakovo Теляково
- Village
- Location within Ivanovo Oblast Location within Russia
- Coordinates: 56°57′N 40°04′E
- Country: Russia
- Region: Ivanovo Oblast
- District: Ilyinsky District
- Time zone: UTC+3:00

Telyakovo (Russian: Теляково) is a rural locality (a village) in Ilyinsky District, Ivanovo Oblast, Russia. Population: 9 (2010 census);

== Geography ==
This rural locality is located 19 kilometres (12 mi) from Ilyinskoye-Khovanskoye (the district's administrative centre), 54 kilometres (34 mi) from Ivanovo (capital of Ivanovo Oblast) and 200 kilometres (120 mi) from Moscow. Semyonovskoye is the nearest rural locality.
