= Kolyagino =

Kolyagino Колягино
- Selo
- Location within Ivanovo Oblast Location within Russia
- Coordinates: 56°45′N 39°27′E
- Country: Russia
- Region: Ivanovo Oblast
- District: Ilyinsky District
- Time zone: UTC+3:00

Kolyagino (Russian: Колягино) is a rural locality (a selo) in Ilyinsky District, Ivanovo Oblast, Russia. Population: 18 (2010 census);

== Geography ==
This rural locality is located 30 kilometres (19 mi) from Ilyinskoye-Khovanskoye (the district's administrative centre), 96 kilometres (60 mi) from Ivanovo (capital of Ivanovo Oblast) and 158 kilometres (98 mi) from Moscow. Chernokulovo is the nearest rural locality.
