= Marino, Ivanovo Oblast =

Marino Марино
- Village
- Location within Ivanovo Oblast Location within Russia
- Coordinates: 56°59′N 40°04′E
- Country: Russia
- Region: Ivanovo Oblast
- District: Ilyinsky District
- Time zone: UTC+3:00

Marino (Russian: Марино) is a rural locality (a village) in Ilyinsky District, Ivanovo Oblast, Russia. Population: 19 (2010 census);

== Geography ==
This rural locality is located 17 kilometres (11 mi) from Ilyinskoye-Khovanskoye (the district's administrative centre), 65 kilometres (40 mi) from Ivanovo (capital of Ivanovo Oblast) and 204 kilometres (127 mi) from Moscow. Yakshino is the nearest rural locality.
