= Isayevskoye =

Isayevskoye Исаевское
- Selo
- Location within Ivanovo Oblast Location within Russia
- Coordinates: 57°00′N 39°41′E
- Country: Russia
- Region: Ivanovo Oblast
- District: Ilyinsky District
- Time zone: UTC+3:00

Isayevskoye (Russian: Исаевское) is a rural locality (a selo) in Ilyinsky District, Ivanovo Oblast, Russia. Population: 393 (2010 census);

== Geography ==
This rural locality is located 7 kilometres (4.3 mi) from Ilyinskoye-Khovanskoye (the district's administrative centre), 77 kilometres (48 mi) from Ivanovo (capital of Ivanovo Oblast) and 188 kilometres (117 mi) from Moscow. Gorbovo is the nearest rural locality.
