= Zarubino, Ilyinsky District, Ivanovo Oblast =

Zarubino Зарубино
- Village
- Location within Ivanovo Oblast Location within Russia
- Coordinates: 56°51′N 39°53′E
- Country: Russia
- Region: Ivanovo Oblast
- District: Ilyinsky District
- Time zone: UTC+3:00

Zarubino (Russian: Зарубино) is a rural locality (a village) in Ilyinsky District, Ivanovo Oblast, Russia. Population: 10 (2010 census);

== Geography ==
This rural locality is located 15 kilometres (9.3 mi) from Ilyinskoye-Khovanskoye (the district's administrative centre), 67 kilometres (42 mi) from Ivanovo (capital of Ivanovo Oblast) and 185 kilometres (115 mi) from Moscow. Barmino is the nearest rural locality.
