= Shumyatino =

Shumyatino Шумятино
- Village
- Location within Ivanovo Oblast Location within Russia
- Coordinates: 57°00′N 39°46′E
- Country: Russia
- Region: Ivanovo Oblast
- District: Ilyinsky District
- Time zone: UTC+3:00

Shumyatino (Russian: Шумятино) is a rural locality (a village) in Ilyinsky District, Ivanovo Oblast, Russia. Population: 8 (2010 census);

== Geography ==
This rural locality is located 4 kilometres (2.5 mi) from Ilyinskoye-Khovanskoye (the district's administrative centre), 72 kilometres (45 mi) from Ivanovo (capital of Ivanovo Oblast) and 191 kilometres (119 mi) from Moscow. Fedorovskoye is the nearest rural locality.
