= Kruttsy, Ilyinsky District, Ivanovo Oblast =

Kruttsy Крутцы
- Village
- Location within Ivanovo Oblast Location within Russia
- Coordinates: 56°46′N 39°30′E
- Country: Russia
- Region: Ivanovo Oblast
- District: Ilyinsky District
- Time zone: UTC+3:00

Kruttsy (Russian: Крутцы) is a rural locality (a village) in Ilyinsky District, Ivanovo Oblast, Russia. Population: 10 (2010 census);

== Geography ==
This rural locality is located 26 kilometres (16 mi) from Ilyinskoye-Khovanskoye (the district's administrative centre), 92 kilometres (57 mi) from Ivanovo (capital of Ivanovo Oblast) and 162 kilometres (101 mi) from Moscow. Poluyevo is the nearest rural locality.
