= Satyrevo =

Satyrevo Сатырево
- Village
- Location within Ivanovo Oblast Location within Russia
- Coordinates: 56°56′N 39°58′E
- Country: Russia
- Region: Ivanovo Oblast
- District: Ilyinsky District
- Time zone: UTC+3:00

Satyrevo (Russian: Сатырево) is a rural locality (a village) in Ilyinsky District, Ivanovo Oblast, Russia. Population: 28 (2010 census); 28 (2002 census);

== Geography ==
This rural locality is located 13 kilometres (8.1 mi) from Ilyinskoye-Khovanskoye (the district's administrative centre), 60 kilometres (37 mi) from Ivanovo (capital of Ivanovo Oblast) and 194 kilometres (121 mi) from Moscow. Ankovo is the nearest rural locality.
