= Kablukovo, Ivanovo Oblast =

Kablukovo Каблуково
- Village
- Location within Ivanovo Oblast Location within Russia
- Coordinates: 56°51′N 40°04′E
- Country: Russia
- Region: Ivanovo Oblast
- District: Ilyinsky District
- Time zone: UTC+3:00

Kablukovo (Russian: Каблуково) is a rural locality (a village) in Ilyinsky District, Ivanovo Oblast, Russia. Population: 46 (2010 census); 60 (2002 census);

== Geography ==
This rural locality is located 23 kilometres (14 mi) from Ilyinskoye-Khovanskoye (the district's administrative centre), 56 kilometres (35 mi) from Ivanovo (capital of Ivanovo Oblast) and 193 kilometres (120 mi) from Moscow. Sofronovo is the nearest rural locality.
