= Makaryino, Ivanovo Oblast =

Makaryino Макарьино
- Village
- Location within Ivanovo Oblast Location within Russia
- Coordinates: 56°53′N 39°52′E
- Country: Russia
- Region: Ivanovo Oblast
- District: Ilyinsky District
- Time zone: UTC+3:00

Makaryino (Russian: Макарьино) is a rural locality (a village) in Ilyinsky District, Ivanovo Oblast, Russia. Population: 38 (2010 census); 37 (2002 census);

== Geography ==
This rural locality is located 11 kilometres (6.8 mi) from Ilyinskoye-Khovanskoye (the district's administrative centre), 67 kilometres (42 mi) from Ivanovo (capital of Ivanovo Oblast) and 187 kilometres (116 mi) from Moscow. Dushilovo is the nearest rural locality.
