= Vyazovitsy Malye =

Vyazovitsy Malye Вязовицы Малые
- Village
- Location within Ivanovo Oblast Location within Russia
- Coordinates: 56°54′N 40°05′E
- Country: Russia
- Region: Ivanovo Oblast
- District: Ilyinsky District
- Time zone: UTC+3:00

Vyazovitsy Malye (Russian: Вязовицы Малые) is a rural locality (a village) in Ilyinsky District, Ivanovo Oblast, Russia. Population: 12 (2010 census); 42 (2002 census);

== Geography ==
This rural locality is located 21 kilometres (13 mi) from Ilyinskoye-Khovanskoye (the district's administrative centre), 54 kilometres (34 mi) from Ivanovo (capital of Ivanovo Oblast) and 198 kilometres (123 mi) from Moscow. Yadrevo is the nearest rural locality.
