= Alekseyevskoye, Ivanovo Oblast =

Alekseyevskoye Алексеевское
- Selo
- Location within Ivanovo Oblast Location within Russia
- Coordinates: 56°53′N 39°47′E
- Country: Russia
- Region: Ivanovo Oblast
- District: Ilyinsky District
- Time zone: UTC+3:00

Alekseyevskoye (Russian: Алексеевское) is a rural locality (a selo) in Ilyinsky District, Ivanovo Oblast, Russia. Population: 28 (2010 census);

== Geography ==
This rural locality is located 9 kilometres (5.6 mi) from Ilyinskoye-Khovanskoye (the district's administrative centre), 73 kilometres (45 mi) from Ivanovo (capital of Ivanovo Oblast) and 183 kilometres (114 mi) from Moscow. Froltsevo is the nearest rural locality.
