= Daniltsevo, Ivanovo Oblast =

Daniltsevo Данильцево
- Village
- Location within Ivanovo Oblast Location within Russia
- Coordinates: 56°52′N 39°53′E
- Country: Russia
- Region: Ivanovo Oblast
- District: Ilyinsky District
- Time zone: UTC+3:00

Daniltsevo (Russian: Данильцево) is a rural locality (a village) in Ilyinsky District, Ivanovo Oblast, Russia. Population: 18 (2010 census); 14 (2002 census);

== Geography ==
This rural locality is located 13 kilometres (8.1 mi) from Ilyinskoye-Khovanskoye (the district's administrative centre), 67 kilometres (42 mi) from Ivanovo (capital of Ivanovo Oblast) and 186 kilometres (116 mi) from Moscow. Redtsyno is the nearest rural locality.
