= Martyukovo =

Martyukovo Мартюково
- Village
- Location within Ivanovo Oblast Location within Russia
- Coordinates: 57°08′N 39°52′E
- Country: Russia
- Region: Ivanovo Oblast
- District: Ilyinsky District
- Time zone: UTC+3:00

Martyukovo (Russian: Мартюково) is a rural locality (a village) in Ilyinsky District, Ivanovo Oblast, Russia. Population: 37 (2010 census);

== Geography ==
This rural locality is located 20 kilometres (12 mi) from Ilyinskoye-Khovanskoye (the district's administrative centre), 68 kilometres (42 mi) from Ivanovo (capital of Ivanovo Oblast) and 206 kilometres (128 mi) from Moscow. Kaptsevo is the nearest rural locality.
