= Kovarchino =

Kovarchino Коварчино
- Selo
- Location within Ivanovo Oblast Location within Russia
- Coordinates: 56°58′N 40°03′E
- Country: Russia
- Region: Ivanovo Oblast
- District: Ilyinsky District
- Time zone: UTC+3:00

Kovarchino (Russian: Коварчино) is a rural locality (a selo) in Ilyinsky District, Ivanovo Oblast, Russia. Population: 220 (2010 census);

== Geography ==
This rural locality is located 17 kilometres (11 mi) from Ilyinskoye-Khovanskoye (the district's administrative centre), 55 kilometres (34 mi) from Ivanovo (capital of Ivanovo Oblast) and 201 kilometres (125 mi) from Moscow. Maryino is the nearest rural locality.
