= Nikitinka, Ivanovo Oblast =

Nikitinka Никитинка
- Village
- Location within Ivanovo Oblast Location within Russia
- Coordinates: 56°50′N 39°51′E
- Country: Russia
- Region: Ivanovo Oblast
- District: Ilyinsky District
- Time zone: UTC+3:00

Nikitinka (Russian: Никитинка) is a rural locality (a village) in Ilyinsky District, Ivanovo Oblast, Russia. Population: 9 (2010 census); 16 (2002 census);

== Geography ==
This rural locality is located 16 kilometres (9.9 mi) from Ilyinskoye-Khovanskoye (the district's administrative centre), 70 kilometres (43 mi) from Ivanovo (capital of Ivanovo Oblast) and 182 kilometres (113 mi) from Moscow. Igrishchi is the nearest rural locality.
