= Zaykovo, Ivanovo Oblast =

Zaykovo Зайково
- Village
- Location within Ivanovo Oblast Location within Russia
- Coordinates: 57°01′N 39°56′E
- Country: Russia
- Region: Ivanovo Oblast
- District: Ilyinsky District
- Time zone: UTC+3:00

Zaykovo (Russian: Зайково) is a rural locality (a village) in Ilyinsky District, Ivanovo Oblast, Russia. Population: 31 (2010 census);

== Geography ==
This rural locality is located 12 kilometres (7.5 mi) from Ilyinskoye-Khovanskoye (the district's administrative centre), 62 kilometres (39 mi) from Ivanovo (capital of Ivanovo Oblast) and 199 kilometres (124 mi) from Moscow. Denisovo Maloye is the nearest rural locality.
