= Filyukovo =

Filyukovo Филюково
- Village
- Location within Ivanovo Oblast Location within Russia
- Coordinates: 56°51′N 39°34′E
- Country: Russia
- Region: Ivanovo Oblast
- District: Ilyinsky District
- Time zone: UTC+3:00

Filyukovo (Russian: Филюково) is a rural locality (a village) in Ilyinsky District, Ivanovo Oblast, Russia. Population: 8 (2010 census);

== Geography ==
This rural locality is located 17 kilometres (11 mi) from Ilyinskoye-Khovanskoye (the district's administrative centre), 86 kilometres (53 mi) from Ivanovo (capital of Ivanovo Oblast) and 171 kilometres (106 mi) from Moscow. Shchennikovo is the nearest rural locality.
