= Sverchkovo, Ilyinsky District, Ivanovo Oblast =

Sverchkovo Сверчково
- Village
- Location within Ivanovo Oblast Location within Russia
- Coordinates: 56°50′N 39°54′E
- Country: Russia
- Region: Ivanovo Oblast
- District: Ilyinsky District
- Time zone: UTC+3:00

Sverchkovo (Russian: Сверчково) is a rural locality (a village) in Ilyinsky District, Ivanovo Oblast, Russia. Population: 35 (2010 census); 34 (2002 census);

== Geography ==
This rural locality is located 16 kilometres (9.9 mi) from Ilyinskoye-Khovanskoye (the district's administrative centre), 66 kilometres (41 mi) from Ivanovo (capital of Ivanovo Oblast) and 185 kilometres (115 mi) from Moscow. Zarubino is the nearest rural locality.
