= Kulachevo =

Kulachevo Кулачево
- Selo
- Location within Ivanovo Oblast Location within Russia
- Coordinates: 56°58′N 39°39′E
- Country: Russia
- Region: Ivanovo Oblast
- District: Ilyinsky District
- Time zone: UTC+3:00

Kulachevo (Russian: Кулачево) is a rural locality (a selo) in Ilyinsky District, Ivanovo Oblast, Russia. Population: 211 (2010 census);

== Geography ==
This rural locality is located 7 kilometres (4.3 mi) from Ilyinskoye-Khovanskoye (the district's administrative centre), 80 kilometres (50 mi) from Ivanovo (capital of Ivanovo Oblast) and 183 kilometres (114 mi) from Moscow. Spas-Gorodets is the nearest rural locality.
