= Sidorovo, Ivanovo Oblast =

Sidorovo Сидорово
- Village
- Location within Ivanovo Oblast Location within Russia
- Coordinates: 57°07′N 39°59′E
- Country: Russia
- Region: Ivanovo Oblast
- District: Ilyinsky District
- Time zone: UTC+3:00

Sidorovo (Russian: Сидорово) is a rural locality (a selo) in Ilyinsky District, Ivanovo Oblast, Russia. Population: 18 (2010 census);

== Geography ==
This rural locality is located 21 kilometres (13 mi) from Ilyinskoye-Khovanskoye (the district's administrative centre), 61 kilometres (38 mi) from Ivanovo (capital of Ivanovo Oblast) and 209 kilometres (130 mi) from Moscow. Rakshino is the nearest rural locality.
