= Lipkino =

Lipkino Липкино
- Village
- Location within Ivanovo Oblast Location within Russia
- Coordinates: 56°49′N 39°51′E
- Country: Russia
- Region: Ivanovo Oblast
- District: Ilyinsky District
- Time zone: UTC+3:00

Lipkino (Russian: Липкино) is a rural locality (a village) in Ilyinsky District, Ivanovo Oblast, Russia. Population: 7 (2010 census); 15 (2002 census);

== Geography ==
This rural locality is located 17 kilometres (11 mi) from Ilyinskoye-Khovanskoye (the district's administrative centre), 70 kilometres (43 mi) from Ivanovo (capital of Ivanovo Oblast) and 181 kilometres (112 mi) from Moscow. Nikitinka is the nearest rural locality.
