= Retivtsevo =

Retivtsevo Ретивцево
- Village
- Location within Ivanovo Oblast Location within Russia
- Coordinates: 56°51′N 39°56′E
- Country: Russia
- Region: Ivanovo Oblast
- District: Ilyinsky District
- Time zone: UTC+3:00

Retivtsevo (Russian: Ретивцево) is a rural locality (a village) in Ilyinsky District, Ivanovo Oblast, Russia. Population: 9 (2010 census);

== Geography ==
This rural locality is located 16 kilometres (9.9 mi) from Ilyinskoye-Khovanskoye (the district's administrative centre), 65 kilometres (40 mi) from Ivanovo (capital of Ivanovo Oblast) and 187 kilometres (116 mi) from Moscow. Vorontsovo is the nearest rural locality.
