= Osvetino =

Osvetino Осветино
- Village
- Location within Ivanovo Oblast Location within Russia
- Coordinates: 57°04′N 39°59′E
- Country: Russia
- Region: Ivanovo Oblast
- District: Ilyinsky District
- Time zone: UTC+3:00

Osvetino (Russian: Осветино) is a rural locality (a village) in Ilyinsky District, Ivanovo Oblast, Russia. Population: 30 (2010 census);

== Geography ==
This rural locality is located 18 kilometres (11 mi) from Ilyinskoye-Khovanskoye (the district's administrative centre), 60 kilometres (37 mi) from Ivanovo (capital of Ivanovo Oblast) and 206 kilometres (128 mi) from Moscow. Koshcheyevo is the nearest rural locality.
