= Nikulkino, Ivanovo Oblast =

Nikulkino Никулкино
- Village
- Location within Ivanovo Oblast Location within Russia
- Coordinates: 57°02′N 39°43′E
- Country: Russia
- Region: Ivanovo Oblast
- District: Ilyinsky District
- Time zone: UTC+3:00

Nikulkino (Russian: Никулкино) is a rural locality (a village) in Ilyinsky District, Ivanovo Oblast, Russia. Population: 11 (2010 census);

== Geography ==
This rural locality is located 9 kilometres (5.6 mi) from Ilyinskoye-Khovanskoye (the district's administrative centre), 75 kilometres (47 mi) from Ivanovo (capital of Ivanovo Oblast) and 192 kilometres (119 mi) from Moscow. Polezhayka is the nearest rural locality.
