= Ksty =

Ksty Ксты
- Village
- Location within Ivanovo Oblast Location within Russia
- Coordinates: 56°49′N 40°05′E
- Country: Russia
- Region: Ivanovo Oblast
- District: Ilyinsky District
- Time zone: UTC+3:00

Ksty (Russian: Ксты) is a rural locality (a village) in Ilyinsky District, Ivanovo Oblast, Russia. Population: 34 (2010 census); 23 (2002 census);

== Geography ==
This rural locality is located 25 kilometres (16 mi) from Ilyinskoye-Khovanskoye (the district's administrative centre), 56 kilometres (35 mi) from Ivanovo (capital of Ivanovo Oblast) and 192 kilometres (119 mi) from Moscow. Votola is the nearest rural locality.
