= Shchennikovo =

Shchennikovo Щенниково
- Village
- Location within Ivanovo Oblast Location within Russia
- Coordinates: 56°51′N 39°36′E
- Country: Russia
- Region: Ivanovo Oblast
- District: Ilyinsky District
- Time zone: UTC+3:00

Shchennikovo (Russian: Щенниково) is a rural locality (a village) in Ilyinsky District, Ivanovo Oblast, Russia. Population: 518 (2010 census);

== Geography ==
This rural locality is located 16 kilometres (9.9 mi) from Ilyinskoye-Khovanskoye (the district's administrative centre), 84 kilometres (52 mi) from Ivanovo (capital of Ivanovo Oblast) and 172 kilometres (107 mi) from Moscow. Torlyga is the nearest rural locality.
