= Vyazovoye, Ilyinsky District, Ivanovo Oblast =

Vyazovoye Вязовое
- Village
- Location within Ivanovo Oblast Location within Russia
- Coordinates: 56°50′N 39°29′E
- Country: Russia
- Region: Ivanovo Oblast
- District: Ilyinsky District
- Time zone: UTC+3:00

Vyazovoye (Russian: Вязовое) is a rural locality (a village) in Ilyinsky District, Ivanovo Oblast, Russia. Population: 19 (2010 census);

== Geography ==
This rural locality is located 23 kilometres (14 mi) from Ilyinskoye-Khovanskoye (the district's administrative centre), 92 kilometres (57 mi) from Ivanovo (capital of Ivanovo Oblast) and 165 kilometres (103 mi) from Moscow. Khlebnitsy is the nearest rural locality.
