= Redtsyno =

Redtsyno Редцыно
- Village
- Location within Ivanovo Oblast Location within Russia
- Coordinates: 56°51′N 39°54′E
- Country: Russia
- Region: Ivanovo Oblast
- District: Ilyinsky District
- Time zone: UTC+3:00

Redtsyno (Russian: Редцыно) is a rural locality (a village) in Ilyinsky District, Ivanovo Oblast, Russia. Population: 9 (2010 census); 6 (2002 census);

== Geography ==
This rural locality is located 15 kilometres (9.3 mi) from Ilyinskoye-Khovanskoye (the district's administrative centre), 66 kilometres (41 mi) from Ivanovo (capital of Ivanovo Oblast) and 185 kilometres (115 mi) from Moscow. Zarubino is the nearest rural locality.
