= Spas-Nerl =

Spas-Nerl Спас-Нерль
- Village
- Location within Ivanovo Oblast Location within Russia
- Coordinates: 56°48′N 39°35′E
- Country: Russia
- Region: Ivanovo Oblast
- District: Ilyinsky District
- Time zone: UTC+3:00

Spas-Nerl (Russian: Спас-Нерль) is a rural locality (a village) in Ilyinsky District, Ivanovo Oblast, Russia. Population: 10 (2010 census);

== Geography ==
This rural locality is located 21 kilometres (13 mi) from Ilyinskoye-Khovanskoye (the district's administrative centre), 86 kilometres (53 mi) from Ivanovo (capital of Ivanovo Oblast) and 168 kilometres (104 mi) from Moscow. Kosyakovo is the nearest rural locality.
