= Yakovlevo, Ilyinsky District, Ivanovo Oblast =

Yakovlevo Яковлево
- Village
- Location within Ivanovo Oblast Location within Russia
- Coordinates: 57°00′N 39°53′E
- Country: Russia
- Region: Ivanovo Oblast
- District: Ilyinsky District
- Time zone: UTC+3:00

Yakovlevo (Russian: Яковлево) is a rural locality (a village) in Ilyinsky District, Ivanovo Oblast, Russia. Population: 7 (2010 census);

== Geography ==
This rural locality is located 9 kilometres (5.6 mi) from Ilyinskoye-Khovanskoye (the district's administrative centre), 65 kilometres (40 mi) from Ivanovo (capital of Ivanovo Oblast) and 196 kilometres (122 mi) from Moscow. Ovsyannikovo is the nearest rural locality.
