= Igrishchi =

Igrishchi Игрищи
- Selo
- Location within Ivanovo Oblast Location within Russia
- Coordinates: 56°50′N 39°51′E
- Country: Russia
- Region: Ivanovo Oblast
- District: Ilyinsky District
- Time zone: UTC+3:00

Igrishchi (Russian: Игрищи) is a rural locality (a selo) in Ilyinsky District, Ivanovo Oblast, Russia. Population: 221 (2010 census);

== Geography ==
This rural locality is located 15 kilometres (9.3 mi) from Ilyinskoye-Khovanskoye (the district's administrative centre), 70 kilometres (43 mi) from Ivanovo (capital of Ivanovo Oblast) and 182 kilometres (113 mi) from Moscow. Nikitinka is the nearest rural locality.
