= Minchakovo, Ivanovo Oblast =

Minchakovo Минчаково
- Village
- Location within Ivanovo Oblast Location within Russia
- Coordinates: 57°02′N 39°40′E
- Country: Russia
- Region: Ivanovo Oblast
- District: Ilyinsky District
- Time zone: UTC+3:00

Minchakovo (Russian: Минчаково) is a rural locality (a village) in Ilyinsky District, Ivanovo Oblast, Russia. Population: 15 (2010 census);

== Geography ==
This rural locality is located 10 kilometres (6.2 mi) from Ilyinskoye-Khovanskoye (the district's administrative centre), 78 kilometres (48 mi) from Ivanovo (capital of Ivanovo Oblast) and 190 kilometres (120 mi) from Moscow. Osipovo is the nearest rural locality.
