= Churilovo Bolshoye =

Churilovo Bolshoye Чурилово Большое
- Village
- Location within Ivanovo Oblast Location within Russia
- Coordinates: 57°00′N 39°37′E
- Country: Russia
- Region: Ivanovo Oblast
- District: Ilyinsky District
- Time zone: UTC+3:00

Churilovo Bolshoye (Russian: Чурилово Большое) is a rural locality (a village) in Ilyinsky District, Ivanovo Oblast, Russia. Population: 6 (2010 census);

== Geography ==
This rural locality is located 10 kilometres (6.2 mi) from Ilyinskoye-Khovanskoye (the district's administrative centre), 82 kilometres (51 mi) from Ivanovo (capital of Ivanovo Oblast) and 184 kilometres (114 mi) from Moscow. Butyrevo is the nearest rural locality.
