= Kolchigino =

Kolchigino Колчигино
- Village
- Location within Ivanovo Oblast Location within Russia
- Coordinates: 56°53′N 39°39′E
- Country: Russia
- Region: Ivanovo Oblast
- District: Ilyinsky District
- Time zone: UTC+3:00

Kolchigino (Russian: Колчигино) is a rural locality (a village) in Ilyinsky District, Ivanovo Oblast, Russia. Population: 36 (2010 census);

== Geography ==
This rural locality is located 11 kilometres (6.8 mi) from Ilyinskoye-Khovanskoye (the district's administrative centre), 81 kilometres (50 mi) from Ivanovo (capital of Ivanovo Oblast) and 177 kilometres (110 mi) from Moscow. Petryayka is the nearest rural locality.
