= Konstantinovo, Ivanovo Oblast =

Konstantinovo Константиново
- Village
- Location within Ivanovo Oblast Location within Russia
- Coordinates: 56°50′N 39°50′E
- Country: Russia
- Region: Ivanovo Oblast
- District: Ilyinsky District
- Time zone: UTC+3:00

Konstantinovo (Russian: Константиново) is a rural locality (a village) in Ilyinsky District, Ivanovo Oblast, Russia. Population: 75 (2010 census); 108 (2002 census);

== Geography ==
This rural locality is located 15 kilometres (9.3 mi) from Ilyinskoye-Khovanskoye (the district's administrative centre), 70 kilometres (43 mi) from Ivanovo (capital of Ivanovo Oblast) and 182 kilometres (113 mi) from Moscow. Igrishchi is the nearest rural locality.
