= Gorbovo, Ilyinsky District, Ivanovo Oblast =

Gorbovo Горбово
- Village
- Location within Ivanovo Oblast Location within Russia
- Coordinates: 57°00′N 39°41′E
- Country: Russia
- Region: Ivanovo Oblast
- District: Ilyinsky District
- Time zone: UTC+3:00

Gorbovo (Russian: Горбово) is a rural locality (a village) in Ilyinsky District, Ivanovo Oblast, Russia. Population: 14 (2010 census);

== Geography ==
This rural locality is located 6 kilometres (3.7 mi) from Ilyinskoye-Khovanskoye (the district's administrative centre), 78 kilometres (48 mi) from Ivanovo (capital of Ivanovo Oblast) and 187 kilometres (116 mi) from Moscow. Kolokunovo is the nearest rural locality.
