= Perlevka =

Perlevka Перлевка
- Village
- Location within Ivanovo Oblast Location within Russia
- Coordinates: 56°55′N 39°57′E
- Country: Russia
- Region: Ivanovo Oblast
- District: Ilyinsky District
- Time zone: UTC+3:00

Perlevka (Russian: Перлевка) is a rural locality (a village) in Ilyinsky District, Ivanovo Oblast, Russia. Population: 20 (2010 census);

== Geography ==
This rural locality is located 13 kilometres (8.1 mi) from Ilyinskoye-Khovanskoye (the district's administrative centre), 62 kilometres (39 mi) from Ivanovo (capital of Ivanovo Oblast) and 193 kilometres (120 mi) from Moscow. Chebykovo is the nearest rural locality.
