= Shchadnevo =

Shchadnevo Щаднево
- Village
- Location within Ivanovo Oblast Location within Russia
- Coordinates: 57°01′N 39°38′E
- Country: Russia
- Region: Ivanovo Oblast
- District: Ilyinsky District
- Time zone: UTC+3:00

Shchadnevo (Russian: Щаднево) is a rural locality (a village) in Ilyinsky District, Ivanovo Oblast, Russia. Population: 5 (2010 census);

== Geography ==
This rural locality is located 10 kilometres (6.2 mi) from Ilyinskoye-Khovanskoye (the district's administrative centre), 80 kilometres (50 mi) from Ivanovo (capital of Ivanovo Oblast) and 187 kilometres (116 mi) from Moscow. Osipovo is the nearest rural locality.
