= Nazherovo =

Nazherovo Нажерово
- Selo
- Location within Ivanovo Oblast Location within Russia
- Coordinates: 57°06′N 39°55′E
- Country: Russia
- Region: Ivanovo Oblast
- District: Ilyinsky District
- Time zone: UTC+3:00

Nazherovo (Russian: Нажерово) is a rural locality (a selo) in Ilyinsky District, Ivanovo Oblast, Russia. Population: 203 (2010 census);

== Geography ==
This rural locality is located 18 kilometres (11 mi) from Ilyinskoye-Khovanskoye (the district's administrative centre), 64 kilometres (40 mi) from Ivanovo (capital of Ivanovo Oblast) and 205 kilometres (127 mi) from Moscow. Schastlivka is the nearest rural locality.
