= Novoselka =

Novoselka Новоселка
- Village
- Location within Ivanovo Oblast Location within Russia
- Coordinates: 56°56′N 39°57′E
- Country: Russia
- Region: Ivanovo Oblast
- District: Ilyinsky District
- Time zone: UTC+3:00

Novoselka (Russian: Новоселка) is a rural locality (a village) in Ilyinsky District, Ivanovo Oblast, Russia. Population: 208 (2010 census); 205 (2002 census);

== Geography ==
This rural locality is located 12 kilometres (7.5 mi) from Ilyinskoye-Khovanskoye (the district's administrative centre), 61 kilometres (38 mi) from Ivanovo (capital of Ivanovo Oblast) and 195 kilometres (121 mi) from Moscow. Dyagilevo is the nearest rural locality.
