= Skokovo, Ilyinsky District, Ivanovo Oblast =

Skokovo Скоково
- Village
- Location within Ivanovo Oblast Location within Russia
- Coordinates: 57°05′N 39°57′E
- Country: Russia
- Region: Ivanovo Oblast
- District: Ilyinsky District
- Time zone: UTC+3:00

Skokovo (Russian: Скоково) is a rural locality (a village) in Ilyinsky District, Ivanovo Oblast, Russia. Population: 23 (2010 census);

== Geography ==
This rural locality is located 18 kilometres (11 mi) from Ilyinskoye-Khovanskoye (the district's administrative centre), 62 kilometres (39 mi) from Ivanovo (capital of Ivanovo Oblast) and 205 kilometres (127 mi) from Moscow. Schastlivka is the nearest rural locality.
