= Kolokunovo =

Kolokunovo Колокуново
- Village
- Location within Ivanovo Oblast Location within Russia
- Coordinates: 56°59′N 39°42′E
- Country: Russia
- Region: Ivanovo Oblast
- District: Ilyinsky District
- Time zone: UTC+3:00

Kolokunovo (Russian: Колокуново) is a rural locality (a village) in Ilyinsky District, Ivanovo Oblast, Russia. Population: 7 (2010 census);

== Geography ==
This rural locality is located 5 kilometres (3.1 mi) from Ilyinskoye-Khovanskoye (the district's administrative centre), 76 kilometres (47 mi) from Ivanovo (capital of Ivanovo Oblast) and 188 kilometres (117 mi) from Moscow. Gorbovo is the nearest rural locality.
