= Abramovo, Ilyinsky District, Ivanovo Oblast =

Abramovo Абрамово
- Village
- Location within Ivanovo Oblast Location within Russia
- Coordinates: 56°50′N 39°35′E
- Country: Russia
- Region: Ivanovo Oblast
- District: Ilyinsky District
- Time zone: UTC+3:00

Abramovo (Russian: Абрамово) is a rural locality (a village) in Ilyinsky District, Ivanovo Oblast, Russia. Population: 6 (2010 census);

== Geography ==
This rural locality is located 18 kilometres (11 mi) from Ilyinskoye-Khovanskoye (the district's administrative centre), 86 kilometres (53 mi) from Ivanovo (capital of Ivanovo Oblast) and 170 kilometres (110 mi) from Moscow. Pustoboyarka is the nearest rural locality.
