= Spas-Gorodets =

Spas-Gorodets Спас-Городец
- Village
- Location within Ivanovo Oblast Location within Russia
- Coordinates: 56°58′N 39°39′E
- Country: Russia
- Region: Ivanovo Oblast
- District: Ilyinsky District
- Time zone: UTC+3:00

Spas-Gorodets (Russian: Спас-Городец) is a rural locality (a selo) in Ilyinsky District, Ivanovo Oblast, Russia. Population: 23 (2010 census);

== Geography ==
This rural locality is located 6 kilometres (3.7 mi) from Ilyinskoye-Khovanskoye (the district's administrative centre), 79 kilometres (49 mi) from Ivanovo (capital of Ivanovo Oblast) and 184 kilometres (114 mi) from Moscow. Kulachevo is the nearest rural locality.
