= Ratchino =

Ratchino Ратчино
- Village
- Location within Ivanovo Oblast Location within Russia
- Coordinates: 57°00′N 39°59′E
- Country: Russia
- Region: Ivanovo Oblast
- District: Ilyinsky District
- Time zone: UTC+3:00

Ratchino (Russian: Ратчино) is a rural locality (a village) in Ilyinsky District, Ivanovo Oblast, Russia. Population: 8 (2010 census);

== Geography ==
This rural locality is located 14 kilometres (8.7 mi) from Ilyinskoye-Khovanskoye (the district's administrative centre), 59 kilometres (37 mi) from Ivanovo (capital of Ivanovo Oblast) and 200 kilometres (120 mi) from Moscow. Golovishchi is the nearest rural locality.
