= Denisovo Maloye =

Denisovo Maloye Денисово Малое
- Village
- Location within Ivanovo Oblast Location within Russia
- Coordinates: 57°00′N 39°56′E
- Country: Russia
- Region: Ivanovo Oblast
- District: Ilyinsky District
- Time zone: UTC+3:00

Denisovo Maloye (Russian: Денисово Малое) is a rural locality (a village) in Ilyinsky District, Ivanovo Oblast, Russia. Population: 8 (2010 census);

== Geography ==
This rural locality is located 11 kilometres (6.8 mi) from Ilyinskoye-Khovanskoye (the district's administrative centre), 63 kilometres (39 mi) from Ivanovo (capital of Ivanovo Oblast) and 198 kilometres (123 mi) from Moscow. Kuzyayevo is the nearest rural locality.
