= Kaptsevo =

Kaptsevo Капцево
- Village
- Location within Ivanovo Oblast Location within Russia
- Coordinates: 57°07′N 39°51′E
- Country: Russia
- Region: Ivanovo Oblast
- District: Ilyinsky District
- Time zone: UTC+3:00

Kaptsevo (Russian: Капцево) is a rural locality (a village) in Ilyinsky District, Ivanovo Oblast, Russia. Population: 15 (2010 census);

== Geography ==
This rural locality is located 19 kilometres (12 mi) from Ilyinskoye-Khovanskoye (the district's administrative centre), 68 kilometres (42 mi) from Ivanovo (capital of Ivanovo Oblast) and 204 kilometres (127 mi) from Moscow. Lystsovo is the nearest rural locality.
