= Golovishchi =

Golovishchi Головищи
- Village
- Location within Ivanovo Oblast Location within Russia
- Coordinates: 57°00′N 40°00′E
- Country: Russia
- Region: Ivanovo Oblast
- District: Ilyinsky District
- Time zone: UTC+3:00

Golovishchi (Russian: Головищи) is a rural locality (a village) in Ilyinsky District, Ivanovo Oblast, Russia. Population: 5 (2010 census);

== Geography ==
This rural locality is located 16 kilometres (9.9 mi) from Ilyinskoye-Khovanskoye (the district's administrative centre), 58 kilometres (36 mi) from Ivanovo (capital of Ivanovo Oblast) and 202 kilometres (126 mi) from Moscow. Ratchino is the nearest rural locality.
