= Senikha =

Senikha Сениха
- Village
- Location within Ivanovo Oblast Location within Russia
- Coordinates: 56°53′N 40°06′E
- Country: Russia
- Region: Ivanovo Oblast
- District: Ilyinsky District
- Time zone: UTC+3:00

Senikha (Russian: Сениха) is a rural locality (a village) in Ilyinsky District, Ivanovo Oblast, Russia. Population: 94 (2010 census); 93 (2002 census);

== Geography ==
This rural locality is located 22 kilometres (14 mi) from Ilyinskoye-Khovanskoye (the district's administrative centre), 54 kilometres (34 mi) from Ivanovo (capital of Ivanovo Oblast) and 197 kilometres (122 mi) from Moscow. Poddubnovo is the nearest rural locality.
