= Veska, Ivanovo Oblast =

Veska Веска
- Selo
- Location within Ivanovo Oblast Location within Russia
- Coordinates: 56°53′N 39°58′E
- Country: Russia
- Region: Ivanovo Oblast
- District: Ilyinsky District
- Time zone: UTC+3:00

Veska (Russian: Веска) is a rural locality (a selo) in Ilyinsky District, Ivanovo Oblast, Russia. Population: 80 (2010 census);

== Geography ==
This rural locality is located 15 kilometres (9.3 mi) from Ilyinskoye-Khovanskoye (the district's administrative centre), 61 kilometres (38 mi) from Ivanovo (capital of Ivanovo Oblast) and 191 kilometres (119 mi) from Moscow. Pushenino is the nearest rural locality.
