= Ivashevo, Ilyinsky District, Ivanovo Oblast =

Ivashevo Ивашево
- Selo
- Location within Ivanovo Oblast Location within Russia
- Coordinates: 56°58′N 39°53′E
- Country: Russia
- Region: Ivanovo Oblast
- District: Ilyinsky District
- Time zone: UTC+3:00

Ivashevo (Russian: Ивашево) is a rural locality (a selo) in Ilyinsky District, Ivanovo Oblast, Russia. Population: 534 (2010 census);

== Geography ==
This rural locality is located 8 kilometres (5.0 mi) from Ilyinskoye-Khovanskoye (the district's administrative centre), 65 kilometres (40 mi) from Ivanovo (capital of Ivanovo Oblast) and 194 kilometres (121 mi) from Moscow. Yakovlevo is the nearest rural locality.
