= Spirki =

Spirki Спирки
- Village
- Location within Ivanovo Oblast Location within Russia
- Coordinates: 56°52′N 39°43′E
- Country: Russia
- Region: Ivanovo Oblast
- District: Ilyinsky District
- Time zone: UTC+3:00

Spirki (Russian: Спирки) is a rural locality (a village) in Ilyinsky District, Ivanovo Oblast, Russia. Population: 35 (2010 census);

== Geography ==
This rural locality is located 12 kilometres (7.5 mi) from Ilyinskoye-Khovanskoye (the district's administrative centre), 77 kilometres (48 mi) from Ivanovo (capital of Ivanovo Oblast) and 178 kilometres (111 mi) from Moscow. Verigino is the nearest rural locality.
