= Antushkovo =

Antushkovo Антушково
- Selo
- Location within Ivanovo Oblast Location within Russia
- Coordinates: 56°55′N 39°32′E
- Country: Russia
- Region: Ivanovo Oblast
- District: Ilyinsky District
- Time zone: UTC+3:00

Antushkovo (Russian: Антушково) is a rural locality (a selo) in Ilyinsky District, Ivanovo Oblast, Russia. Population: 78 (2010 census);

== Geography ==
This rural locality is located 14 kilometres (8.7 mi) from Ilyinskoye-Khovanskoye (the district's administrative centre), 87 kilometres (54 mi) from Ivanovo (capital of Ivanovo Oblast) and 175 kilometres (109 mi) from Moscow. Popovka is the nearest rural locality.
