= Astafyevo, Ilyinsky District, Ivanovo Oblast =

Astafyevo Астафьево
- Village
- Location within Ivanovo Oblast Location within Russia
- Coordinates: 57°07′N 39°56′E
- Country: Russia
- Region: Ivanovo Oblast
- District: Ilyinsky District
- Time zone: UTC+3:00

Astafyevo (Russian: Астафьево) is a rural locality (a village) in Ilyinsky District, Ivanovo Oblast, Russia. Population: 39 (2010 census);

== Geography ==
This rural locality is located 20 kilometres (12 mi) from Ilyinskoye-Khovanskoye (the district's administrative centre), 64 kilometres (40 mi) from Ivanovo (capital of Ivanovo Oblast) and 207 kilometres (129 mi) from Moscow. Petrovo is the nearest rural locality.
