= Matvei Tevelev =

Matvei Grigoryevich Tevelev (March 20, 1908 - May 20, 1962) was a Russian writer, playwright, screenwriter and songwriter.

He was born in Ilyino, Smolensk province and began writing in his teens. His early works were devoted to the formation of Soviet power. When war broke out, he was caught in the Siege of Leningrad but was later evacuated. He worked as a screenwriter with the Lenfilm studio (from 1939) and with the wartime studio TsOKS. After the war he lived in Transcarpathia, in the town of Uzhhorod. The Second World War featured in much of his later writing.

He was the author of the novel Verkhovina, our land so dear (one of the famous performances of the Transcarpathian theater was staged based on it in 1957), and the play in four acts Towards the Squadron. Together with N. Bogoslovsky, he wrote the song Letter to Moscow (first performed by S. Y. Lemeshev). Verkhovina, our land so dear was translated into English; another work Hotel in Snegovets was also translated into several South Asian languages.

He collaborated with Semyon Polotsky on film scripts such as Arinka (1939) and The Old Guard (1941), etc.

== Filmography ==
- 1939 - Arinka (together with S. Polotsky )
- 1940 - Transition (together with S. Polotsky)
- 1941 - The Old Guard (together with S. Polotsky)
- 1942 - Combat film collection No. 12 Episode "Vanka" (together with S. Polotsky)
- 1942 - Mittens (together with S. Polotsky)
