= Rozhnovo, Ilyinsky District, Ivanovo Oblast =

Rozhnovo Рожново
- Village
- Location within Ivanovo Oblast Location within Russia
- Coordinates: 56°49′N 39°33′E
- Country: Russia
- Region: Ivanovo Oblast
- District: Ilyinsky District
- Time zone: UTC+3:00

Rozhnovo (Russian: Рожново) is a rural locality (a village) in Ilyinsky District, Ivanovo Oblast, Russia. Population: 26 (2010 census);

== Geography ==
This rural locality is located 20 kilometres (12 mi) from Ilyinskoye-Khovanskoye (the district's administrative centre), 67 kilometres (42 mi) from Ivanovo (capital of Ivanovo Oblast) and 168 kilometres (104 mi) from Moscow. Kharitontsevo is the nearest rural locality.
