= Ilin =

Ilin may refer to

- Ilin Island in the Philippines
- Ilin Island cloudrunner, a critically endangered cloud rat from Ilin Island
- Ilyin, a Russian surname
