= Ilino =

Ilino may refer to the following villages:

- Ilino (Goražde), Bosnia and Herzegovina
- Ilino, Resen, North Macedonia
- Ilino, Masovian Voivodeship, Poland
- Ilino, Boljevac, Serbia
- the Ilino suburb of the town of Bar, Montenegro

== See also ==
- Ilyino (disambiguation) for localities in Russia
