= Ilyinsky District =

One of two districts in Russia

Location of Ivanovo Oblast in Russia

Location of Perm Krai in Russia

Ilyinsky District is the name of several administrative and municipal districts in Russia:

- Ilyinsky District, Ivanovo Oblast, an administrative and municipal district of Ivanovo Oblast
- Ilyinsky District, Perm Krai, an administrative and municipal district of Perm Krai

== See also ==
- Ilyinsky (disambiguation)
