= Aleksei Ilyin =

Aleksei Ilyin may refer to:

- Aleksei Ilyin (footballer, born 1958), Soviet Russian football midfielder and coach
- Aleksei Ilyin (footballer, born 1978) (b. 1978), Russian football midfielder
