= Ilyino =

Ilyino may refer to:

- Ilyino, Bryansk Oblast, a village in Bryansk Oblast, Russia
- Ilyino, Kalininsky District, Tver Oblast, name of two villages in Kablukovskoye Rural Settlement of Kalininsky District of Tver Oblast, Russia
- Ilyino, Kimrsky District, Tver Oblast, a village in Kimrsky District of Tver Oblast, Russia
- Ilyino, Kuvshinovsky District, Tver Oblast, a village in Kuvshinovsky District of Tver Oblast, Russia
- Ilyino, Nekrasovo Rural Settlement, Rameshkovsky District, Tver Oblast, a village in Nekrasovo Rural Settlement of Rameshkovsky District of Tver Oblast, Russia
- Ilyino, Nikolskoye Rural Settlement, Rameshkovsky District, Tver Oblast, a village in Nikolskoye Rural Settlement of Rameshkovsky District of Tver Oblast, Russia
- Ilyino, Sandovsky District, Tver Oblast, name of two villages in Sobolinskoye Rural Settlement of Sandovsky District of Tver Oblast, Russia
- Ilyino, Bolshekoshinskoye Rural Settlement, Selizharovsky District, Tver Oblast, a village in Bolshekoshinskoye Rural Settlement of Selizharovsky District of Tver Oblast, Russia
- Ilyino, Yeletskoye Rural Settlement, Selizharovsky District, Tver Oblast, a village in Yeletskoye Rural Settlement of Selizharovsky District of Tver Oblast, Russia
- Ilyino, Torzhoksky District, Tver Oblast, a village in Torzhoksky District of Tver Oblast, Russia
- Ilyino, Udomelsky District, Tver Oblast, a village in Udomelsky District of Tver Oblast, Russia
- Ilyino, Zapadnodvinsky District, Tver Oblast, a settlement in Zapadnodvinsky District of Tver Oblast, Russia
- Ilyino, name of several other rural localities in Russia

== See also ==
- Ilino (disambiguation)
- Ilya
- Ilyin
- Ilyinka
- Ilyinsky (disambiguation)
