= Ilyin =

Ilyin or Ilin (Russian: Ильин) is a Russian masculine surname that is derived from the male given name Ilya and literally means Ilya's. Its feminine counterpart is Ilyina or Ilina. It may refer to

- Aleksandr Ilyin (disambiguation), multiple people
- Aleksei Ilyin (disambiguation), multiple people
- Alin Ilin (born 1984), Romanian football player
- Anatoli Ilyin (1931–2016), Soviet Russian football player
- Andrey Ilin (born 1960), Russian film and theatre actor
- Dmitry Ilyin (born 1984), Russian fine art and documentary street photographer
- Efraim Ilin (1912–2011), Israeli tycoon and security expert
- Fyodor Ilyin (1892–1939), Soviet admiral and diplomat
- Gleb Ilyin (1889–1968), Russian-American painter
- Ilya Ilin (born 1988), Kazakhstani weightlifter
- Ivan Ilyin (1883–1954), Russian religious and political philosopher
- Kostiantyn Ilin (born 1975), Ukrainian strongman competitor
- Lev Ilyin (1880–1942), Russian architect
- Mikhail Ilyin (disambiguation), several people
- Modest Ilyin (1889–1967), Russian botanist
- Natalya Ilina (born 1985), Kazakhstani handball player
- Nikolai Ilyin (sniper) (1922–1943), Soviet World War II sniper
- Nikolai Ilyin (Yehowist) (1809–1890), Russian religious thinker and founder of the movement of Yehowists
- Olga Ilina (born 1995), Russian rhythmic gymnast
- Olga Ilyin, Russian-born American poet and novelist
- Sergei Ilyin (born 1968), Russian football player
- Vasily Ilyin (1949–2015), Soviet handball player
- Vera Ilyina (born 1974), Russian diver
- Victoria Ilina (born 1999), Russian rhythmic gymnast
- Viktor Ilyin (disambiguation), multiple people
- Vladimir Ilyin (disambiguation), several people
- Yekaterina Ilyina (born 1991), Russian handball player
- Yuriy Ilyin (born 1962), Ukrainian Admiral and Chief of the General Staff
- Yuri Ilyin (born 1968), Kazakhstani politician, Minister of Emergency Situations
- Zoltan Ilin (born 1955), Yugoslavian tennis player
