= Ilyinskaya, Tarnogsky District, Vologda Oblast =

Ilyinskaya Ильинская
- Village
- Location within Vologda Oblast Location within Russia
- Coordinates: 60°44′N 43°06′E
- Country: Russia
- Region: Vologda Oblast
- District: Tarnogsky District
- Time zone: UTC+3:00

Ilyinskaya (Russian: Ильинская) is a rural locality (a village) in Spasskoye Rural Settlement, Tarnogsky District, Vologda Oblast, Russia. The population was 32 as of 2002.

== Geography ==
Ilyinskaya is located 44 km northwest of Tarnogsky Gorodok (the district's administrative centre) by road. Antipinskaya is the nearest rural locality.
