= Ilyinskoye, Nikolsky District, Vologda Oblast =

Ilyinskoye Ильинское
- Village
- Location within Vologda Oblast Location within Russia
- Coordinates: 59°49′N 45°05′E
- Country: Russia
- Region: Vologda Oblast
- District: Nikolsky District
- Time zone: UTC+3:00

Ilyinskoye (Russian: Ильинское) is a rural locality (a village) in Argunovskoye Rural Settlement, Nikolsky District, Vologda Oblast, Russia. The population was 246 as of 2002.

== Geography ==
The distance to Nikolsk is 47 km, to Argunovo is 3 km. Pavlovo is the nearest rural locality.
