= Mikhail Ilyin =

Mikhail Ilyin may refer to:

- Mikhail Ilyin (dancer), dancer
- Mikhail Ilyin (ice hockey) (born 2005), Russian ice hockey player
- Mikhail Osorgin, born Mikhail Andreyevich Ilyin, (1878–1942), Russian writer, journalist, and essayist
- Mikhail Alekseevich Ilyin (1915–2007), Soviet economic, state and political figure, Hero of Socialist Labor
- Mikhail Andreyevich Ilyin (art critic) (1903–1981), Soviet art historian
- Mikhail Vasilyevich Ilyin (born 1948), Russian scientist of Political Studies
- Mikhail Dmitrievich Ilyin (1866–1942), Russian scientist of biological chemistry
- Mikhail Ilyich Ilyin (1876–1935), Udmurt Soviet poet, folklorist, and ethnographer
