= Ilyinskoye, Velikoustyugsky District, Vologda Oblast =

Ilyinskoye Ильинское
- Selo
- Location within Vologda Oblast Location within Russia
- Coordinates: 60°36′N 46°45′E
- Country: Russia
- Region: Vologda Oblast
- District: Velikoustyugsky District
- Time zone: UTC+3:00

Ilyinskoye (Russian: Ильинское) is a rural locality (a selo) and the administrative center of Pokrovskoye Rural Settlement, Velikoustyugsky District, Vologda Oblast, Russia. The population was 155 as of 2002.

== Geography ==
Ilyinskoye is located 35 km southeast of Veliky Ustyug (the district's administrative centre) by road. Maloye Chebayevo is the nearest rural locality.
