= Ilyinka, Altai Republic =

Ilyinka Ильинка
- Selo
- Interactive map of Ilyinka
- Location within Altai Republic Location within Russia
- Coordinates: 51°26′N 85°06′E
- Country: Russia
- Region: Altai Republic
- District: Shebalinsky District
- Time zone: UTC+7:00

Ilyinka (Russian: Ильинка) is a rural locality (a selo) and the administrative centre of Ilyinskoye Rural Settlement, Shebalinsky District, the Altai Republic, Russia. The population was 690 as of 2016. There are 5 streets.

== Geography ==
Ilyinka is located 85 km northwest of Shebalino (the district's administrative centre) by road. Mariinsk is the nearest rural locality.
