= Ilyinskoye, Kineshemsky District, Ivanovo Oblast =

Ilyinskoye Ильинское
- Village
- Location within Ivanovo Oblast Location within Russia
- Coordinates: 57°00′N 42°00′E
- Country: Russia
- Region: Ivanovo Oblast
- District: Kineshemsky District
- Time zone: UTC+3:00

Ilyinskoye (Russian: Ильинское) is a rural locality (a selo) in Kineshemsky District, Ivanovo Oblast, Russia. Population: 204 (2010 census);

== Geography ==
This rural locality is located 28 kilometres (17 mi) from Kineshma (the district's administrative centre), 110 kilometres (68 mi) from Ivanovo (capital of Ivanovo Oblast) and 352 kilometres (219 mi) from Moscow. Yakimovo is the nearest rural locality.
