= Ilyinka, Shipunovsky District, Altai Krai =

Ilyinka Ильинка
- Selo
- Interactive map of Ilyinka
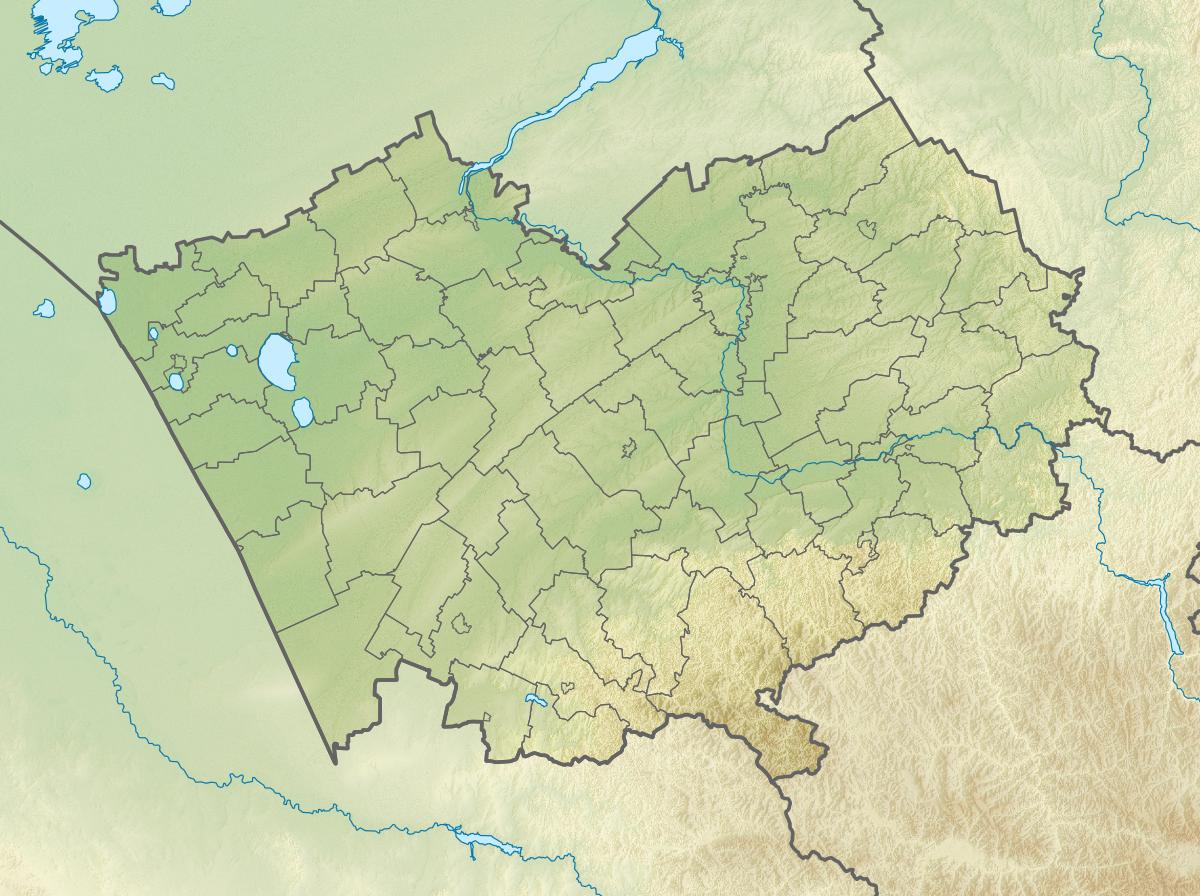
- Location within Altai Krai Location within Russia
- Coordinates: 51°57′N 82°22′E
- Country: Russia
- Region: Altai Krai
- District: Shipunovsky District
- Time zone: UTC+7:00

Ilyinka (Russian: Ильинка) is a rural locality (a selo) and the administrative center of Ilyinsky Selsoviet, Shipunovsky District, Altai Krai, Russia. The population was 315 as of 2013. There are 7 streets.

== Geography ==
Ilyinka is located 45 km SSE of Shipunovo (the district's administrative centre) by road. Yeltsovka is the nearest rural locality.
