= Ilyino, Torzhoksky District, Tver Oblast =

Rural locality in Torzhoksky District, Russia

Coordinates: 56°53′58″N 34°56′59″E

Ilyino (Russian: Ильино́) is a village in Torzhoksky District of Tver Oblast, Russia.
