= Ilyinskoye, Raboche-Krestyansky Selsoviet, Vologodsky District, Vologda Oblast =

Ilyinskoye Ильинское
- Village
- Location within Vologda Oblast Location within Russia
- Coordinates: 59°44′N 39°03′E
- Country: Russia
- Region: Vologda Oblast
- District: Vologodsky District
- Time zone: UTC+3:00

Ilyinskoye (Russian: Ильинское) is a rural locality (a village) in Vologodsky District, Vologda Oblast, Russia. The population was 12 as of 2002.

== Geography ==
The distance to Vologda is 64.6 km, to Nepotyagovo is 31 km. Kruglitsa, Nikitino, Pochinok, Krugolka, Yepifanka, Norobovo and Dovodchikovo are the nearest rural localities.
