= Ilyinskaya, Ivanovo Oblast =

Ilyinskaya Ильинская
- Village
- Location within Ivanovo Oblast Location within Russia
- Coordinates: 56°32′N 41°34′E
- Country: Russia
- Region: Ivanovo Oblast
- District: Savinsky District
- Time zone: UTC+3:00

Ilyinskaya (Russian: Ильинская) is a rural locality (a village) in Savinsky District, Ivanovo Oblast, Russia. Population: 12 (2010 census);

== Geography ==
This rural locality is located 23 kilometres (14 mi) from Savino (the district's administrative centre), 63 kilometres (39 mi) from Ivanovo (capital of Ivanovo Oblast) and 258 kilometres (160 mi) from Moscow. Goryachevo is the nearest rural locality.
