= Ilyinka, Uchalinsky District, Republic of Bashkortostan =

Ilyinka Ильинка
- Village
- Interactive map of Ilyinka
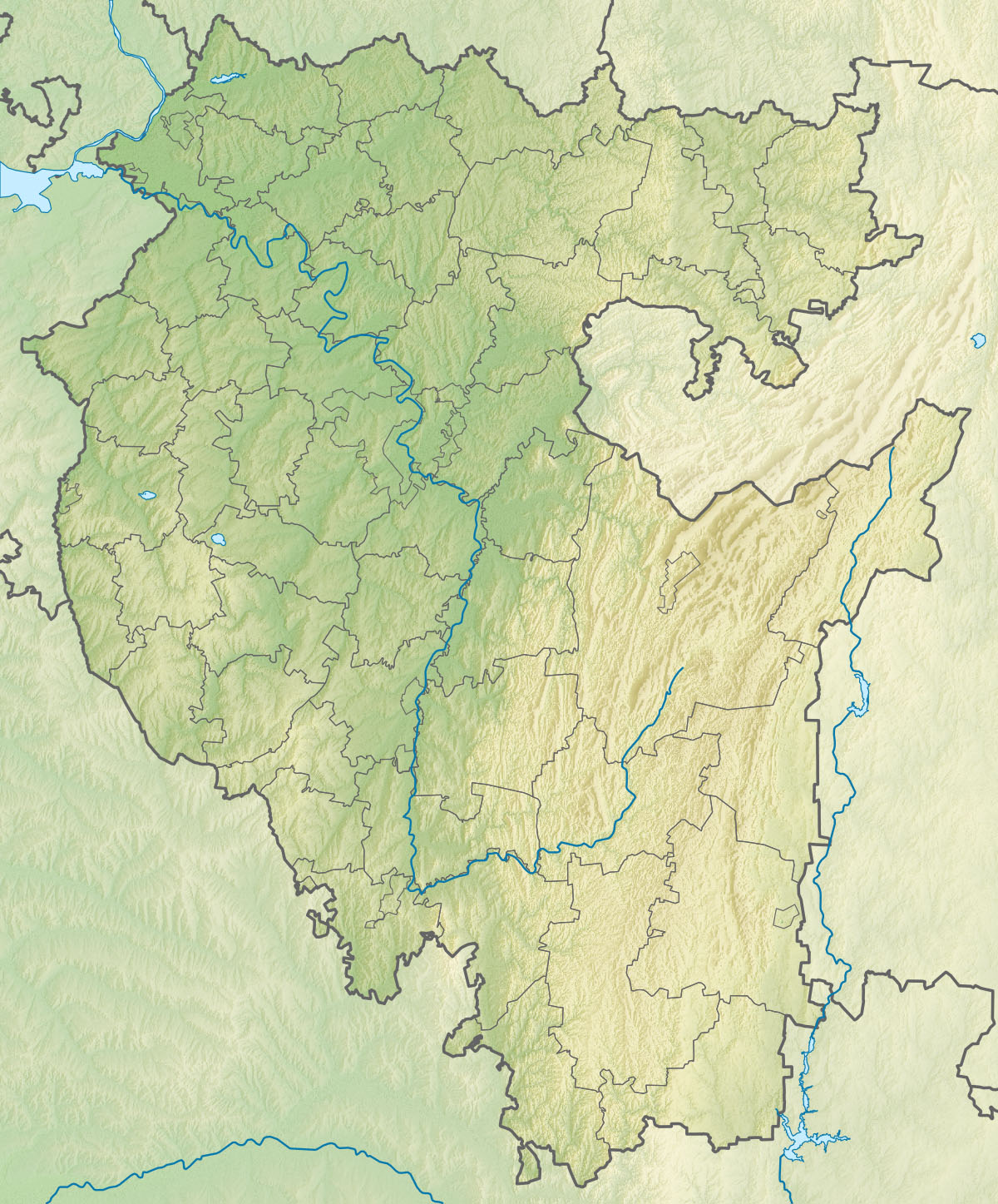
- Location within Bashkortostan Location within Russia
- Coordinates: 54°29′N 59°33′E
- Country: Russia
- Region: Bashkortostan
- District: Uchalinsky District
- Time zone: UTC+5:00

Ilyinka (Russian: Ильинка) is a rural locality (a village) in Mansurovsky Selsoviet, Uchalinsky District, Bashkortostan, Russia. The population was 173 as of 2010. There are 5 streets.

== Geography ==
Ilyinka is located 28 km northeast of Uchaly (the district's administrative centre) by road. Mansurovo is the nearest rural locality.
