= Aleksei Ilyin (footballer, born 1978) =

Russian footballer

Personal information
- Full name: Aleksei Vladimirovich Ilyin
- Date of birth: 6 March 1978 (age 48)
- Place of birth: Tula, Russian SFSR
- Height: 1.84 m (6 ft 1/2 in)
- Positions: Midfielder; defender

Senior career*
Years	Team	Apps	(Gls)
1995–1998	FC Luch Tula	75	(6)
1999	FC Arsenal Tula	11	(0)
2000–2002	FC Arsenal-2 Tula	68	(10)
2003–2004	FC Dynamo Bryansk	38	(1)
2004	FC Volga Tver	16	(1)
2005	FC Dynamo Bryansk	15	(0)
2005–2007	FC Vityaz Podolsk	73	(9)
2008	FC Dmitrov	31	(2)
2009	FC Avangard Podolsk	4	(0)
- * Club domestic league appearances and goals

Aleksei Vladimirovich Ilyin (Russian: Алексей Владимирович Ильин; born 6 March 1978) is a former Russian professional football player.

== Club career ==
He played 3 seasons in the Russian Football National League for FC Arsenal Tula and FC Dynamo Bryansk.
