= Ilyinskoye, Zavolzhsky District, Ivanovo Oblast =

Ilyinskoye Ильинское
- Village
- Location within Ivanovo Oblast Location within Russia
- Coordinates: 57°29′N 41°55′E
- Country: Russia
- Region: Ivanovo Oblast
- District: Zavolzhsky District
- Time zone: UTC+3:00

Ilyinskoye (Russian: Ильинское) is a rural locality (a village) in Zavolzhsky District, Ivanovo Oblast, Russia. Population: 14 (2010 census);

== Geography ==
This rural locality is located 12 km from Zavolzhsk (the district's administrative centre), 80 km from Ivanovo (capital of Ivanovo Oblast) and 322 km from Moscow. Belkashi is the nearest rural locality.
