= Ilyinskoye, Kirzhachsky District, Vladimir Oblast =

Ilyinskoye Ильинское
- Selo
- Location within Vladimir Oblast Location within Russia
- Coordinates: 56°02′N 38°56′E
- Country: Russia
- Region: Vladimir Oblast
- District: Kirzhachsky District
- Time zone: UTC+3:00

Ilyinskoye (Russian: Ильинское) is a rural locality (a selo) in Pershinskoye Rural Settlement, Kirzhachsky District, Vladimir Oblast, Russia. The population was 9 as of 2010. There are 8 streets.

== Geography ==
Ilyinskoye is located 21 km southeast of Kirzhach (the district's administrative centre) by road. Nikiforovo is the nearest rural locality.
