= Ilyinka, Shelabolikhinsky District, Altai Krai =

Ilyinka Ильинка
- Selo
- Interactive map of Ilyinka
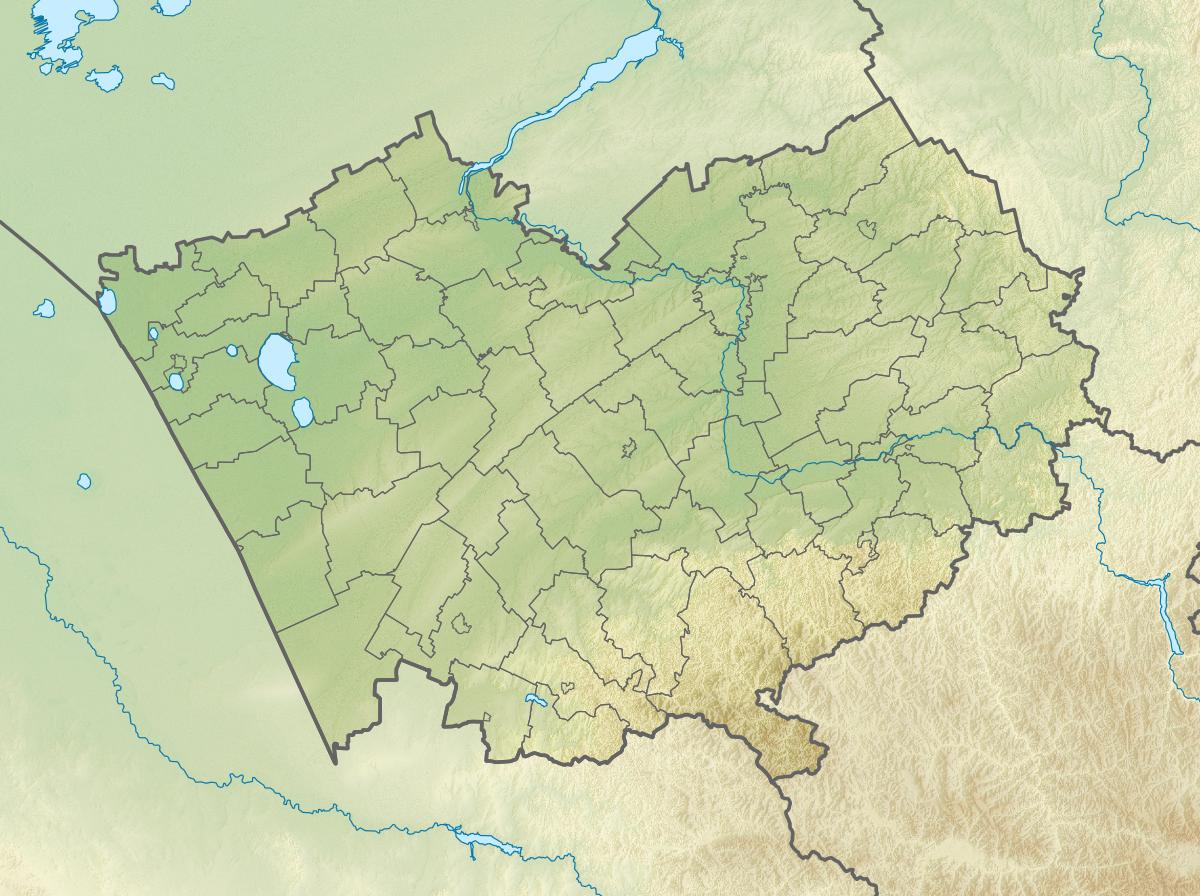
- Location within Altai Krai Location within Russia
- Coordinates: 53°27′N 82°19′E
- Country: Russia
- Region: Altai Krai
- District: Shelabolikhinsky District
- Time zone: UTC+7:00

Ilyinka (Russian: Ильинка) is a rural locality (a selo) and the administrative center of Ilyinsky Selsoviet, Shelabolikhinsky District, Altai Krai, Russia. The population was 654 as of 2013. There are 8 streets.

== Geography ==
Ilyinka is located 22 km northwest of Shelabolikha (the district's administrative centre) by road. Lugovoye is the nearest rural locality.
