= Olga Ilyin =

Russian-American poet and novelist (1894–1991)

- Native name: Ольга Ильина
- Born: Olga Alexandrovna Boratynskaya; 8 August 1894 Kazan, Kazan Governorate, Russian Empire
- Died: 6 November 1991 (aged 97) San Francisco, California, US
- Spouse: Kirill Borisovich Ilyin
- Relatives: Yevgeny Baratynsky (great-grandfather)

Olga Alexandrovna Ilyin–Boratynskaya (née Boratynskaya; Russian: Ольга Александровна Ильина-Боратынская; 8 August 1894 – 6 November 1991) , known by the pen name Olga Ilyin (Russian: Ольга Ильина), was a Russian-born American poet and novelist. Her works were published in Russian, German and English.

== Life ==
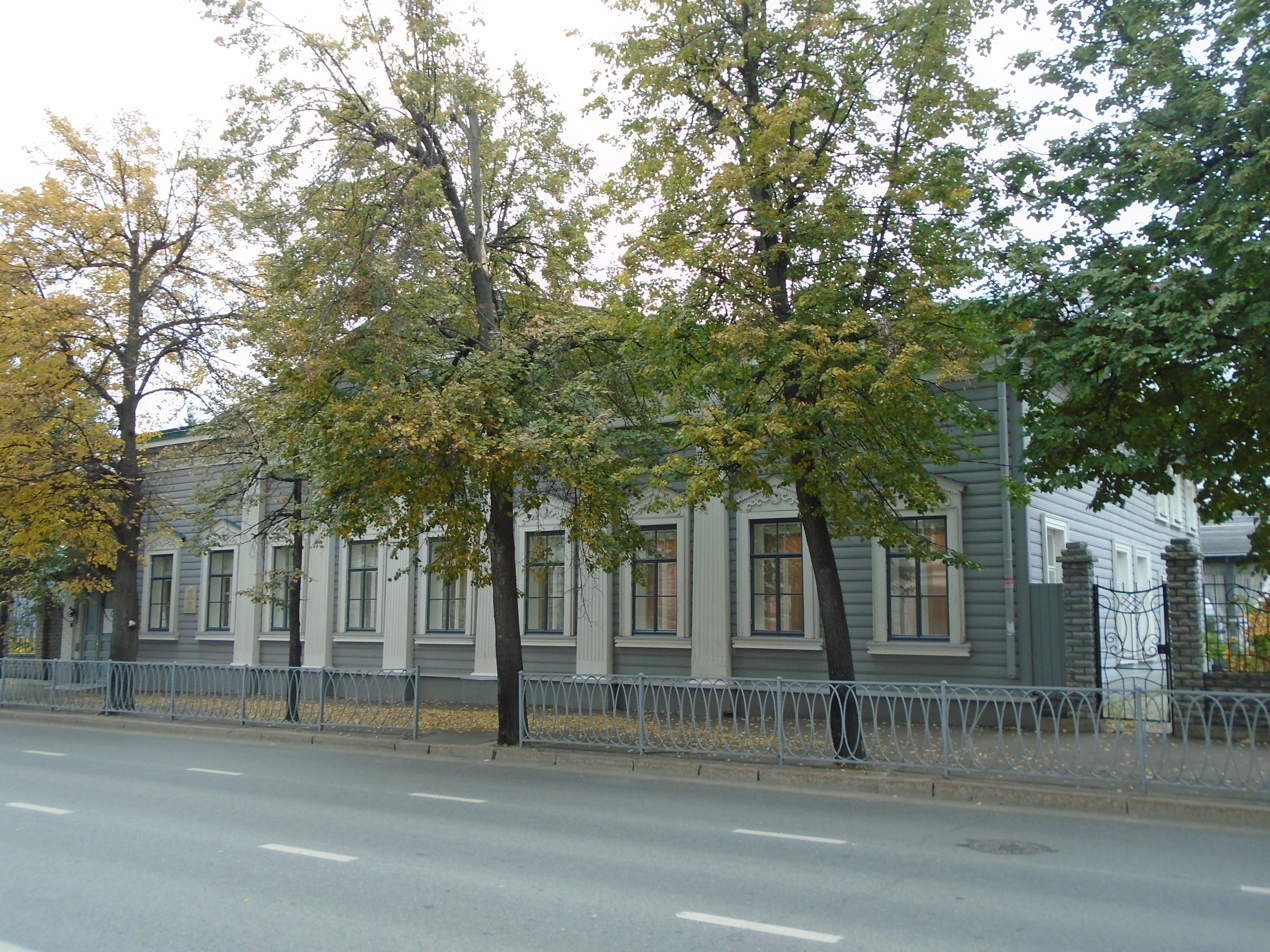
Baratynsky Manor main facade

Ilyin was born Olga Alexandrovna Boratynskaya (Russian: Ольга Александровна Боратынская) on 8 August 1894 (N.S.) in Kazan, Kazan Governorate (present-day Tatarstan, Russia) to Alexander Baratynsky, a lawyer, politician and member of the City and Third State Duma, and Nadezhda Dmitrievna (died 1903). One of three siblings, Ilyin's brother Alexander disappeared during the Russian Civil War and her brother Dmitry was arrested and executed in 1932. Through her father, Ilyin was a member of the nobel Baratynsky family and was the great-granddaughter of the poet Yevgeny Baratynsky.

Following the death of her mother in 1903, Ilyin was raised by her aunt Katya. At the turn of the century, the Baratynsky Manor was one of the spiritual and cultural centers of the city. In 1906 Grigory Rasputin suddenly paid a visit to the Baratynsky family and told them he could read people's mind.

At the very beginning of dinner, when Nastya was about to put a plate of soup in front of Rasputin, he got out a comb, and he began to run it through his oily hair. The plate was quickly cleared away, and Nastya waited with stony disdain for him to finish his task.

Her father arranged a room in good hotel, but when he came back the next day, Rasputin found the doors locked. She met him again in Saint Petersburg visiting her aunt Anna Dmitrievna Shipova, but escaped to her room. Her description of Rasputin and his behavior is a small but no doubt valuable contribution to history. For several years in a row Lita came to the capital in Summer and got acquainted with the intricacies of court life and court etiquette, met with Princess Eugenia Maximilianovna of Leuchtenberg and other members of the House of Oldenburg.

Around the age of 14, illness led to visits with her aunt Katya to Davos, where she was recovering. Back after more than a year, attending Mariinsky women's gymnasium, the medical faculty of Kazan University and Higher Women's Courses she began writing poetry. The first publications were made in the Kazan magazine "Life" (1913). She met with colonel Kirill Borisovich Ilyin, since July 1914 a hussar of the Pavlograd regiment. When World War I broke out, she joined the Red Cross. On 16 February 1917 they married and had a child named Boris. During the Kazan Operation the city was attacked by the Red Army; a third of the population left. Olga moved out with a 9-days-old baby.

She traveled separately from her husband by train to Kurgan in the Ural Mountains and was arrested while somewhere in Siberia. In Krasnoyarsk, the refugees were cut off from the fighting units. She lived there for five months and in May 1920 she returned with her son to Kazan. In December 1920 her husband arrived in Harbin, where thousands of Russian Émigrés gathered. In 1922, she succeeded in reaching this fashionable and booming Chinese city. They were eventually able to emigrate to the United States early 1923. They settled in San Rafael, California, where she became a shopkeeper, and sold beads and women dresses. In SF she soon joined a literary circle. In 1925 some of her poems were published. In 1930 she a became a novelist. Her husband became one of the painters of the new Golden Gate Bridge, which opened in 1937. They lived at the end of Clay Street near Presidio of San Francisco.

Her first novel in English, Dawn of the Eighth Day, is about Nita Ogarin, an aristocratic daughter who marries an army officer soon killed in the Bolshevik Revolution. Her second novel, St. Petersburg Affair, is set in the 1850s. Kyra Beherev, an aristocratic heiress, agrees to marry Count Anatole Melin to appease her aunt, Princess Shubalov. The couple initially decides to remain abstinent and divorce within a year, but they consume their marriage, only to have affairs with other people later. Her third novel, White Road: A Russian Odyssey, is about an aristocratic heiress who decides to flee Russia during the Bolshevik Revolution. In 2014 Visits to the Imperial Court she recounts her experiences as a young girl.

On 6 November 1991, Ilyin died in San Francisco aged 97.

== Selected works ==
- Ilyin, Olga (1951). Dawn of the Eighth Day. New York City: Henry Holt & Co. OCLC 561528929.
- Ilyin, Olga (1983). The St. Petersburg Affair. New York City: Holt, Rinehart and Winston. ISBN 9783552035232. OCLC 80550062.
- Ilyin, Olga (1984). White Road: A Russian Odyssey. New York City: Holt, Rinehart and Winston. ISBN 9780030000782. OCLC 580689866.
- Ilyin, Olga (2014). Visits to the Imperial Court. New York City: Barnes & Noble. ISBN 978-1491856987.
