= Ilyinskoye, Selivanovsky District, Vladimir Oblast =

Ilyinskoye Ильинское
- Selo
- Location within Vladimir Oblast Location within Russia
- Coordinates: 55°59′N 41°42′E
- Country: Russia
- Region: Vladimir Oblast
- District: Selivanovsky District
- Time zone: UTC+3:00

Ilyinskoye (Russian: Ильинское) is a rural locality (a selo) in Volosatovskoye Rural Settlement, Selivanovsky District, Vladimir Oblast, Russia. The population was 44 as of 2010.

== Geography ==
Ilyinskoye is located on the Kestromka River, 22 km north of Krasnaya Gorbatka (the district's administrative centre) by road. Pribrezhnaya is the nearest rural locality.
