= Ilyinskoye, Kolchuginsky District, Vladimir Oblast =

Ilyinskoye Ильинское
- Selo
- Location within Vladimir Oblast Location within Russia
- Coordinates: 56°23′N 39°21′E
- Country: Russia
- Region: Vladimir Oblast
- District: Kolchuginsky District
- Time zone: UTC+3:00

Ilyinskoye (Russian: Ильинское) is a rural locality (a selo) in Ilyinskoye Rural Settlement, Kolchuginsky District, Vladimir Oblast, Russia. The population was 182 as of 2010. There are 6 streets.

== Geography ==
Ilyinskoye is located on the Peksha River, 15 km north of Kolchugino (the district's administrative centre) by road. Novoye is the nearest rural locality.
