= Ilyinka, Alexeyevsky District, Belgorod Oblast =

Ilyinka Ильинка
- Selo
- Interactive map of Ilyinka
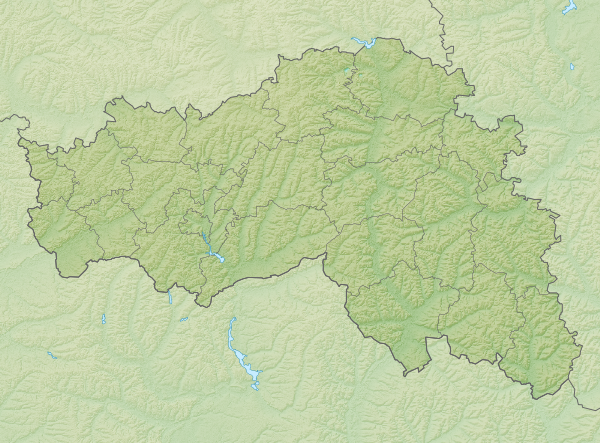
- Location within Belgorod Oblast Location within Russia
- Coordinates: 50°38′N 38°35′E
- Country: Russia
- Region: Belgorod Oblast
- District: Alexeyevsky District
- Time zone: UTC+3:00

Ilyinka (Russian: Ильинка) is a rural locality (a selo) and the administrative center of Ilyinskoye Rural Settlement, Alexeyevsky District, Belgorod Oblast, Russia. The population was 1,308 as of 2010. There are 20 streets.

== Geography ==
Ilyinka is located 8 km northwest of Alexeyevka (the district's administrative centre) by road. Ignatov is the nearest rural locality.
