= Rozhnovo, Ivanovsky District, Ivanovo Oblast =

Rozhnovo Рожново
- Village
- Location within Ivanovo Oblast Location within Russia
- Coordinates: 57°08′N 40°44′E
- Country: Russia
- Region: Ivanovo Oblast
- District: Ivanovsky District
- Time zone: UTC+3:00

Rozhnovo (Russian: Рожново) is a rural locality (a village) in Ivanovsky District, Ivanovo Oblast, Russia. Population: 16 (2010 census);

== Geography ==
This rural locality is located 21 kilometres (13 mi) from Ivanovo (the district's administrative centre and capital of Ivanovo Oblast) and 243 kilometres (151 mi) from Moscow. Popovskoye is the nearest rural locality.
