= Ilyinka, Republic of Buryatia =

Ilyinka Ильинка
- Selo
- Interactive map of Ilyinka
- Location within Republic of Buryatia Location within Russia
- Coordinates: 52°07′N 107°15′E
- Country: Russia
- Region: Republic of Buryatia
- District: Pribaykalsky District
- Time zone: UTC+8:00

Ilyinka (Russian: Ильинка) is a rural locality (a selo) in Pribaykalsky District, Republic of Buryatia, Russia. The population was 4,203 as of 2010. There are 52 streets.

== Geography ==
Ilyinka is located 29 km southwest of Turuntayevo (the district's administrative centre) by road. Troitskoye is the nearest rural locality.
