= Ilyinka, Zabaykalsky Krai =

Ilyinka Ильинка
- Selo
- Location within Zabaykalsky Krai Location within Russia
- Coordinates: 52°03′N 114°10′E
- Country: Russia
- Region: Zabaykalsky Krai
- District: Chitinsky District
- Time zone: UTC+9:00

Ilyinka (Russian: Ильинка) is a rural locality (a selo) in Chitinsky District, Zabaykalsky Krai, Russia. Population: 314 (2021 census); 379 (2010 census); There are 13 streets in this selo.

== Geography ==
This rural locality is located 46 km from Chita (the district's administrative centre and capital of Zabaykalsky Krai) and 5,249 km from Moscow. Novotroitsk is the nearest rural locality.
