= Ilyinka, Kalacheyevsky District, Voronezh Oblast =

Ilyinka Ильинка
- Selo
- Interactive map of Ilyinka
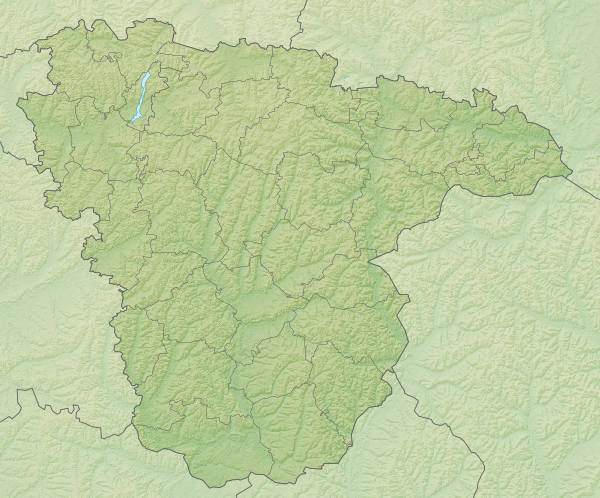
- Location within Voronezh Oblast Location within Russia
- Coordinates: 50°26′N 41°07′E
- Country: Russia
- Region: Voronezh Oblast
- District: Kalacheyevsky District
- Time zone: UTC+3:00

Ilyinka (Russian: Ильинка) is a rural locality (a selo) in Podgorenskoye Rural Settlement, Kalacheyevsky District, Voronezh Oblast, Russia. The population was 531 as of 2010. There are 7 streets.

== Geography ==
Ilyinka is located 11 km east of Kalach (the district's administrative centre) by road. Podgornoye is the nearest rural locality.
