= Aleksandr Ilyin =

Aleksandr Ilyin may refer to:

- Alexander Ilyin (mathematician) (born 1973), Russian mathematician
- Aleksandr Aleksandrovich Ilyin (born 1983), Russian actor
- Aleksandr Ilyin (footballer) (born 1993), Russian footballer
- Alexander Ilyin-Genevsky (1894–1941), Soviet chess player
