= Vladimir Ilyin =

Vladimir Ilyin may refer to:

- Vladimir Ilyin (footballer, born 1928) (1928–2009), Soviet footballer
- Vladimir Ilyin (actor) (born 1947), Russian actor
- Vladimir Ilyin (footballer, born 1992), Russian footballer
- Vladimir Ilyin (mathematician) (1928–2014), Russian mathematician
- Vladimir Ilyin (sociologist) (born 1950), Russian sociologist
