= Ilyinka, Volodarsky District, Astrakhan Oblast =

Ilyinka Ильинка
- Selo
- Interactive map of Ilyinka
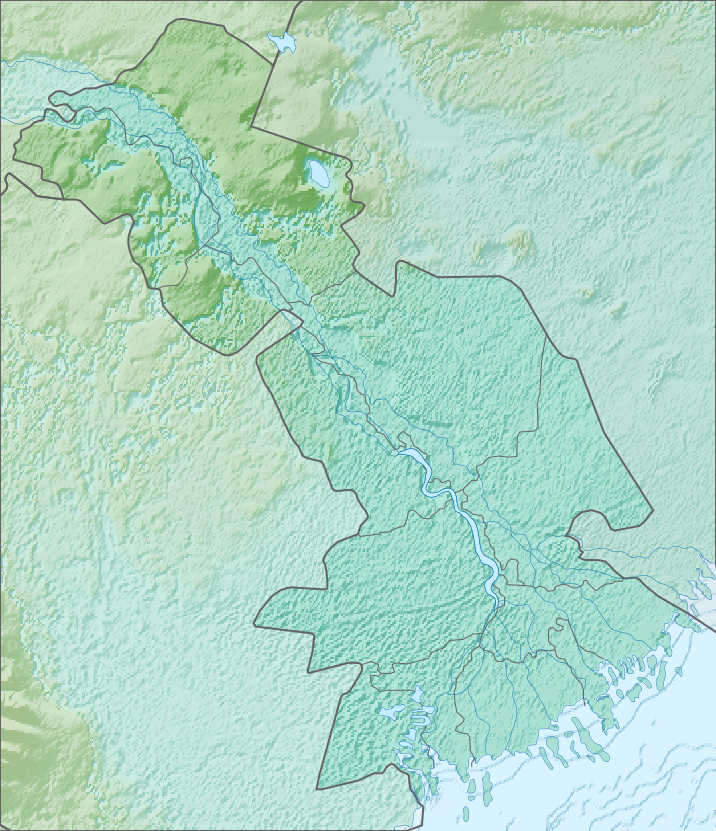
- Location within Astrakhan Oblast Location within Russia
- Coordinates: 46°21′N 48°38′E
- Country: Russia
- Region: Astrakhan Oblast
- District: Volodarsky District
- Time zone: UTC+4:00

Ilyinka (Russian: Ильинка) is a rural locality (a selo) in Bolshemogoysky Selsoviet of Volodarsky District, Astrakhan Oblast, Russia. The population was 35 as of 2010. There are 3 streets.

== Geography ==
Ilyinka is located 26 km (16 mi) southeast of Volodarsky (the district's administrative centre) by road. Meshkovo is the nearest rural locality.
