= Ilyinskoye, Yuryev-Polsky District, Vladimir Oblast =

Ilyinskoye Ильинское
- Selo
- Location within Vladimir Oblast Location within Russia
- Coordinates: 56°30′N 39°38′E
- Country: Russia
- Region: Vladimir Oblast
- District: Yuryev-Polsky District
- Time zone: UTC+3:00

Ilyinskoye (Russian: Ильинское) is a rural locality (a selo) in Krasnoselskoye Rural Settlement, Yuryev-Polsky District, Vladimir Oblast, Russia. The population was 87 as of 2010.

== Geography ==
Ilyinskoye is located 4 km west of Yuryev-Polsky (the district's administrative centre) by road. Poyelovo is the nearest rural locality.
