= Ilyinskoye-Khovanskoye =

Urban locality in Ivanovo Oblast, Russia

Ilyinskoye-Khovanskoye Ильинское-Хованское
- Urban-type settlement
- Interactive map of Ilyinskoye-Khovanskoye
- Location of Ilyinskoye-Khovanskoye Ilyinskoye-Khovanskoye (Ivanovo Oblast)
- Coordinates: 56°58′17″N 39°46′17″E
- Country: Russia
- Federal subject: Ivanovo Oblast
- Administrative district: Ilyinsky District

Population (2010 Census)
  - Total: 3,426
  - Estimate (2025): 3,338 (−2.6%)
- Time zone: UTC+3 (MSK)
- Postal code: 155060
- OKTMO ID: 24609151051

Ilyinskoye-Khovanskoye (Russian: Ильи́нское-Хова́нское) is an urban-type settlement and the administrative center of Ilyinsky District, Ivanovo Oblast, Russia. Population: 3,092 (2021 census); 3,426 (2010 census); 3,768 (2002 census); 4,310 (1989 Soviet census).
