= Ilyinsky District, Ivanovo Oblast =

Ilyinsky District Ильинский район (Russian)
- District
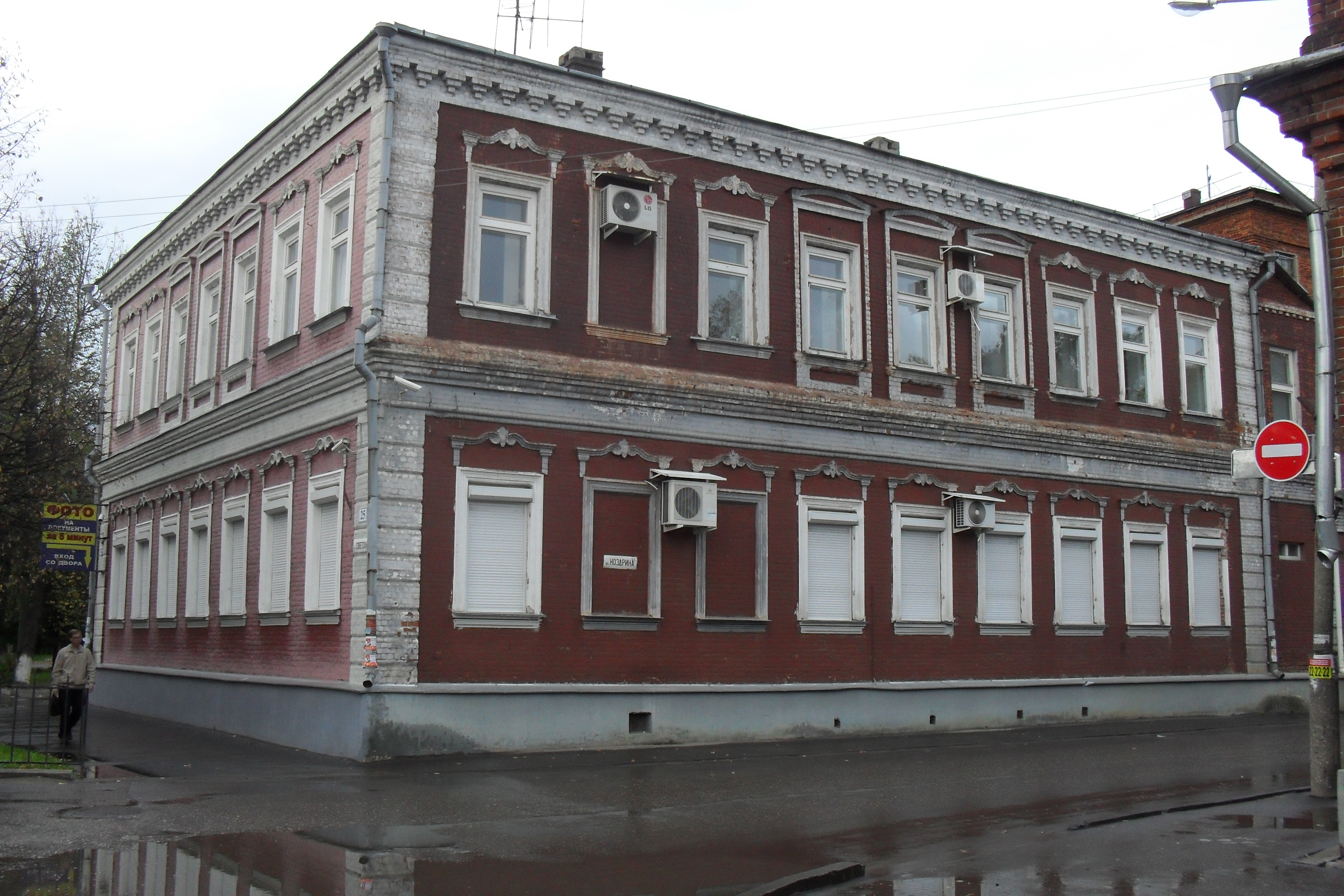
- Building in Ilyinsky District

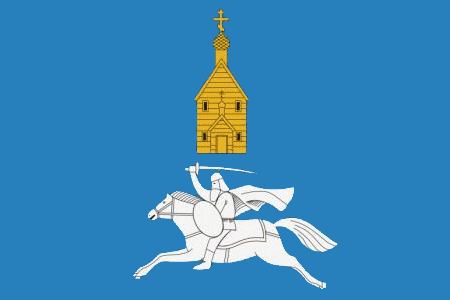
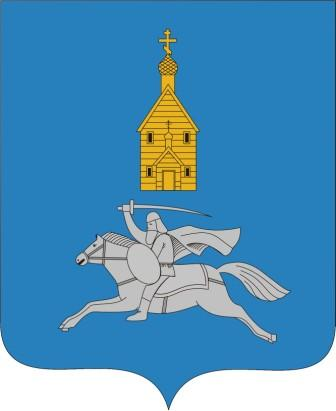
- Flag Coat of arms
- Location of Ilyinsky District in Ivanovo Oblast
- Coordinates: 56°58′16″N 39°45′57″E
- Country: Russia
- Federal subject: Ivanovo Oblast
- Established: 10 June 1929
- Administrative center: Ilyinskoye-Khovanskoye

Area
  - Total: 1,360 km^{2} (530 sq mi)

Population (2010 Census)
  - Total: 9,703
  - Density: 7.13/km^{2} (18.5/sq mi)
  - Urban: 35.3%
  - Rural: 64.7%

Administrative structure
  - Inhabited localities: 156 rural localities

Municipal structure
  - Municipally incorporated as: Ilyinsky Municipal District
  - Municipal divisions: 1 urban settlements, 4 rural settlements
- Time zone: UTC+3 (MSK)
- OKTMO ID: 24609000
- Website: http://www.admilinskoe.ru/

Ilyinsky District (Russian: Ильи́нский райо́н) is an administrative and municipal district (raion), one of the twenty-one in Ivanovo Oblast, Russia. It is located in the west of the oblast. The area of the district is 1,360 square kilometers (530 sq mi). Its administrative center is the urban locality (a settlement) of Ilyinskoye-Khovanskoye. Population: 7,303 (2021 census); 9,703 (2010 census); 11,103 (2002 Census); 13,748 (1989 Soviet census). The population of Ilyinskoye-Khovanskoye accounts for 42.3% of the district's total population.
