= Elias (surname) =

Elias is a surname, and may refer to:

== A ==
- Aban Elias, Iraqi-American civil engineer
- A. B. M. Elias (Abu Bashar Mohammed Elias, 1944–2015), Bangladesh Army brigadier general and diplomat
- Ahmad Elias, Jordanian footballer
- Akhteruzzaman Elias (1943–1997), Bengali writer
- Albert Elias (1971–2012), American sports agent
- Alex Elias, American entrepreneur
- Alix Elias, American actress, known for Married... with Children
- Ana Isabel Elias (born 1965), Angolan middle-distance runner
- Andalib Elias, Bangladeshi diplomat
- Arieh Elias (1921–2015), Israeli actor
- Ariel Elias, American comedian
- Arthur Elias (born 1981), Brazilian football manager
- Athanasios Elias (born 1964), Syriac Orthodox bishop

== B ==
- Benny Elias (born 1963), Lebanese-Australian rugby league footballer
- Bertha Elias (1889–1933), Dutch lawyer, women's rights activist and museum director
- Bill Elias (1923–1998), American football coach
- Bill Elias Jr., American college football coach
- Blas Elias (born 1967), American musician
- Brian Elias (born 1948), British composer
- Buddy Elias (1925–2015), German-Swiss actor#
- Burchard Joan Elias (1799–1871), Governor-General of the Dutch West Indies

== C ==
- Carlos "Caique" Elias (born 1957), Brazilian Jiu-Jitsu master
- Christopher Elias, American non-profit executive

== D ==
- Darren Elias (born 1986), American professional poker player
- Darius Elias (1972–2021), Canadian politician
- Dave Elias (1969–2013), Canadian curler
- David Elias (born 1949), Canadian writer
- David Henry Elias (1882–1953), British railway administrator
- Dorothy Elias-Fahn (born 1962), American voice actress.
- Duncan David Elias (born 1985), Singaporean football player

== E ==
- Eddie Elias (1928–1998), American sports agent
- Edna Elias (born c. 1955), Canadian politician from Nunavut
- Edson Elias (1947–2008), Brazilian pianist
- Eliane Elias (born 1960), Lebanese-Brazilian musician
- Ellen Elias-Bursać (born 1952), American scholar and literary translator
- Enzo Elias (born 2002), Brazilian racing driver
- Eulalia Elias (1788–1865), American rancher

== F ==
- Feliu Elias (1878–1948), Catalan caricaturist and painter

== G ==
- Gastão Elias (born 1990), Portuguese tennis player
- George Elias (rower) (1913–2002), Australian rower
- George A. Elias (born 1959), Filipino politician
- Gifton Elias (born 1987), Indian composer and musician
- Greyce Elias (born 1981), Brazilian politician
- Gyula Éliás, Hungarian musician

== H ==
- Hamza Elias (born 1993), Ghanaian football player
- Hanin Elias (born 1972), German musician
- Hannah Elias (born c.1865), American sex worker and landlord
- Harry Elias (1937–2020), Singaporean lawyer
- Haziq Zikri Elias (born 1991), Malaysian footballer
- Hendrik Elias (1902–1973), Belgian politician
- Henri Alexander Elias (1829–1903), Dutch colonial administrator
- Homer Elias (1955–2001), American football player

== I ==
- Isaac Elias (1590–1630), Dutch Golden Age painter
- Isaak Elias (1912–1998), Canadian politician
- Izhar Elias (born 1977), Dutch classical guitarist

== J ==
- Jamal J. Elias (born 1962), American academic
- James Elias (born 1993), Lebanon international rugby league footballer
- Javvi Elias (born 1997), Bolivian singer, songwriter and record producer
- Jean Elias (born 1969), Brazilian football player
- Jennie Elias, British interior designer
- Joan Puig i Elias (1898–1972), Catalan pedagogue and anarchist
- Johan Engelbert Elias (1895–1959), Dutch historian, also known as Vroedschap van Amsterdam
- John Elias (1775–1841), Christian preacher in Wales
- John Elias (rugby league) (born 1963), Lebanese-Australian rugby league footballer and coach
- Jonathan Elias (born 1956), American composer
- Jorge Elias (footballer) (born 1991), Brazilian footballer
- José Luis Elias (sprinter) (born 1954), Peruvian sprinter
- Joseph Aaron Elias (1881—1949), Indian businessman and member of the Municipal Commission of Singapore
- Julie Elias, American Christian musician
- Julie Elias (author) (1866–1945), German fashion journalist and author
- Julius Elias (1861–1927), German art historian
- Julius Elias, 1st Viscount Southwood (1873–1946), British newspaper proprietor and politician

== K ==
- Kauã Elias (born 2006), Brazilian footballer
- Kazim Elias (born 1972), Malaysian preacher and writer
- Keith Elias (born 1972), American football player –
- Ken Elias (born 1944), Welsh artist
- Khaliquzzaman Elias, Bangladeshi writer
- Klara Elias (born 1985), Icelandic singer and songwriter
- Kurt Elias (born 1928), Austrian wrestler

== L ==
- Lee Elias (1920–1998), American comics artist
- Lino Elias (born 1966), Cuban weightlifter
- Lorne Elias, Canadian chemist
- Lovy Elias (born 1986), American pastor and musician

== M ==
- Mackenzie Elias (born 2000), Canadian curler
- Manny Elias (born 1953), English drummer
- Marc Elias (born 1969), American elections attorney
- Marcos Eduardo Elias (born 1971), Brazilian entrepreneur
- Martín Elías (1990–2017), Colombian vallenato singer and entrepreneur
- Marzuki Elias, Singaporean footballer
- Mathieu Elias (1658–1741), French baroque painter
- Matthew Elias (born 1979), Welsh athlete
- Melissa Elias, Canadian actress
- Michael Elias (born 1940), American writer, film director and producer
- Mike Elias (born 1982), American baseball executive
- Mito Elias, Cape Verdean artist
- Mohammad Elias, Bangladeshi educator and politician
- Mohammed Elias, Indian politician from West Bengal
- Mohd Najmuddin Elias (born 1964), Malaysian politician

== N ==
- Nacif Elias (born 1988), Brazilian-Lebanese judoka
- Nedaa Elias (born 1981), Syrian artist and writer
- Neil Elias, Canadian actor from Quebec
- Ney Elias (1844–1897), English explorer, geographer and diplomat
- Nielsen Elias (born 1952), Brazilian football goalkeeper
- Norbert Elias (1897–1990), German sociologist

== O ==
- Ochobi Elias (born 2007), Nigerian footballer
- Olufemi Elias, Nigerian international lawyer and judge

== P ==
- Pablo Ferré Elías, Spanish football player, manager and referee
- Patrick Elias (born 1947), Welsh barrister and judge
- Peder Elias (born 1997), Norwegian singer-songwriter
- Peter Elias (1923–2001), American computer scientist
- Piero Elias (born 2002), American soccer player

== Q ==
- Quentin Elias (1980–2014), French model and actor

== R ==
- Rafael Elias (born 1999), Brazilian footballer
- Rami Elias (born 1953), Syrian Jesuit priest
- Rick Elias (1955–2019), Nashville songwriter and singer
- Robert Elias, birth name of Robert Downey Sr., American actor and film director
- Roberto José Elias (born 1976), Mexican sport shooter
- Rosalind Elias (1930–2020), American singer
- Ruth Elias (1922–2008), Czech Jewish Auschwitz survivor
- Ryan Elias (born 1995), Welsh rugby union footballer

== S ==
- Sandy Abi-Elias (born 1997), Lebanese footballer
- Shay Elias (born 1999), Israeli footballer
- Sheila Elias, American artist
- Sian Elias (born 1949), New Zealand judge
- Skaff Elias, American game designer

== T ==
- Taslim Olawale Elias (1914–1991), Nigerian judge
- Thiago Elias (born 1987), Brazilian footballer
- Ton Elias (born 1955), Dutch politician
- Ton Elias (journalist) (1921–1980), Dutch journalist

== V ==
- Vic Elias (1948–2006), American-Canadian poet

== Y ==
- Yakob Elias (born 1953), Indian bishop

== Z ==
- Zé Elias (born 1976), Brazilian football player

== Eliáš ==
- Alois Eliáš (1890–1942), Czechoslovak general and politician
- Jaroslav Eliáš (1906–1962), Czech hammer thrower
- Patrik Eliáš (born 1976), Czech ice hockey player
- Pavel Eliáš (born 1986), Czech footballer

== See also ==
- Elías (surname)
- Eliáš
- Ilyas (surname)
