= Elías (surname) =

Elías is a surname, and may refer to:

- Alfonso de Elías (1902–1984), Mexican composer and pianist
- Amalin Yabur Elías (born 1951), Mexican politician
- Anilú Elías (born 1937), Mexican journalist, academic and feminist
- Bernardo Elías (born 1976), Colombian civil engineer and politician
- Carlos Elías (born 1988), Peruvian footballer
- Carme Elías (born 1951), Spanish actress
- Claudio Elías (born 1974), Uruguayan footballer
- Domingo Elías (1805–1867), Interim President of Peru in 1844
- Diego Elías (born 1996), Peruvian squash player
- Eduardo Arellano Elías (1959– 2004), Mexican poet
- Efraín Elías (born 2004), Argentine rugby union footballer
- Erick Elías (born 1980), Mexican actor
- Francisco Elías (1890–1977), Spanish film producer and director
- Guillermo Padrés Elías (born 29 June 1969), Mexican politician
- Imanol Elías (born 1990), Spanish footballer
- Jalil Elías (born 1996), Argentine footballer
- Jaume Elías (1919–1977), Spanish footballer
- Jeferson Elías (born 1998), Brazilian footballer
- Jesús Elías (born 1977), Bolivian musician
- Jimena Elías (born 1989), Peruvian model
- Joan Puig i Elias (1898–1972), Catalan pedagogue and anarchist
- Jorge Serrano Elías (born 1945), Guatemalan industrial engineer and politician
- José Elías (c.1678–c.1755), Catalan organist and composer
- José Luis Elías (born 1954), Peruvian lawyer and politician
- José Miguel Elías (born 1977), Spanish road cyclist
- Josep Elías (1880–1944), Spanish athlete and sports journalist
- Josep Samsó Elías (1887–1936), Spanish Roman Catholic priest
- Manuel Jesús Acosta Elías (born 1970), Spanish educator and politician
- Manuel Ulloa Elías (1922–1992), Peruvian economist and politician
- Manuel de Elías (born 1939), Mexican composer and conductor
- María de Jesús Nolasco Elías (1944–2000), Mexican potter
- Renán Elías (1915–1941), Peruvian aviator
- Roberto Elías (1940–2019), Peruvian footballer
- Roenis Elías (born 1988), Cuban baseball pitcher
- Toni Elías (born 1983), Spanish motorcyclist
- Víctor Elías (born 1991), Spanish actor and singer-songwriter

== See also ==
- Elias (surname)
