= Renan =

Renan is a name present in Portuguese, Spanish, French, Turkish and Breton as an alternative form of Ronan. It may refer to:

== People ==
=== Arts ===
- Ary Renan (1857–1900), French painter and activist
- Emile Renan (1913–2001), American operatic bass-baritone and stage director
- Ernest Renan (1823–1892), French philosopher, historian, and writer
- Henriette Renan (1811–1861), French writer
- Sergio Renán (1933–2015), Argentine actor, director, and screenwriter
- Renán Almendárez Coello (born 1953), Honduran-American radio broadcaster
- Renan Demirkan (born 1955), Turkish–German writer and actress
- Renan Luce (born 1980), Breton singer and songwriter

=== Sports ===
- Renan Barão (born 1987), Brazilian mixed martial arts fighter
- Renan Dal Zotto (born 1960), Brazilian volleyball player
- Renan Lavigne (born 1974), French squash player
- Renan Öztürk (born 1980), Turkish-American climber

==== Association football defenders ====
- Diego Renan (born 1990), Brazilian defender
- Renan Boufleur (born 1990), Brazilian defender
- Renán Calle (born 1976), Ecuadorian defender
- Renan Fonseca (born 1990), Brazilian defender
- Renan (footballer, born 1996), full name Renan dos Santos Paixao, Brazilian defender
- Renan (footballer, born 2002), full name Renan Victor da Silva, Brazilian defender

==== Association football forwards ====
- Renán Addles (born 1989), Panamanian forward
- Renan Marques (born 1983), Brazilian striker
- Renan Santana (footballer, born in Manaus/ Amazonas in march day 18 1990), played Al Rayyan (2010–2015), Brazilian forward midfielder
- Renan Oliveira (footballer, born 1997), Brazilian forward

==== Association football goalkeepers ====
- Renan (footballer, born January 1985), full name Renan Brito Soares, Brazilian goalkeeper
- Renan (footballer, born 1984), full name Renan da Silva Moura, Brazilian goalkeeper
- Renan (footballer, born 1989), full name Renan dos Santos, Brazilian goalkeeper
- Renan Rocha (born 1987), Brazilian goalkeeper
- Renan Ribeiro (born 1990), Brazilian goalkeeper
- Renan (footballer, born December 1990), full name Renan Soares Reuter, Brazilian goalkeeper

==== Association football midfielders ====
- Bruno Renan (born 1991), Brazilian midfielder
- Renan (footballer, born May 1985), full name Marcos Renan de Mattos Ceschin, Brazilian midfielder
- Renan (footballer), full Renan, Brazilian midfielder
- Renan Areias (born 1998), Brazilian midfielder
- Renan Bressan (born 1988), Brazilian midfielder
- Renan (footballer, born 1988), full name Renan Cardoso Domingues, Brazilian midfielder
- Renan Foguinho (born 1989), Brazilian midfielder
- Renan Garcia (born 1986), Brazilian midfielder
- Renan Oliveira (footballer, born 1989), full name Renan Henrique Oliveira Vieira, Brazilian midfielder
- Renan Miranda (born 1986), Brazilian midfielder
- Renan Paulino (born 1995), Brazilian midfielder
- Renan Silva (born 1989), Brazilian midfielder
- Renan Soares (born 1989), Brazilian midfielder for U.D. Oliveirense
- Renan Teixeira (born 1985), Brazilian midfielder
- Renan Wagner (born 1991), Brazilian midfielder

=== Others ===
- Renan Calheiros (born 1955), Brazilian politician
- Renán Elías (1915–1941), Peruvian aviator
- Renan Inestroza (born 1965), Honduran politician
- Renán Rodríguez (1912–1999), Uruguayan journalist and politician

== Places ==
- Renan, Switzerland, a village in the canton of Berne
- Renan, Virginia, United States
- Saint-Renan, a commune in the Finistère department of France

== Other uses ==
- Renan Airways, a defunct Moldovan airline

== See also ==
- French cruiser Ernest Renan, in service 1906–1931
- Musée de la Vie Romantique, a French museum once known as Musée Renan-Scheffer
