= Ilyas (surname) =

Ilyas is a surname, and may refer to:

- Adnan Ilyas (born 1984), Pakistani cricketer
- Akram Ilyas, Sri Lankan politician
- Amna Ilyas (born 1990), Pakistani actress and model
- Aqib Ilyas (born 1992), Pakistani cricketer
- Baba Ilyas, leader of the Babai revolt in Anatolia in the 13th century
- Chaudhary Mohammad Ilyas (born 1954), Indian politician
- Fauzia Ilyas (born 1989), Dutch-Pakistani political activist
- F. M. Ilyas, Indian film director
- Ibrahim Ilyas (born 2000), Somali footballer
- Ihab Ilyas (born 1973), Egyptian-Canadian data science academic
- Javed Ilyas (born 1955), Pakistani cricketer
- Moazzam Ilyas (born 1965), Pakistani naval officer
- Mohammad Ilyas (cricketer) (1946–2026), Pakistani Test cricketer
- Mohammad Ilyas (cricketer, born 1996), Pakistani cricketer for Lahore Blues
- Mohammad Ilyas (cricketer, born 1999), Pakistani cricketer for Peshawar
- Muhammad Ilyas (politician) (1911–1970), Indonesian diplomat
- Qaraja Ilyas, Iranian provincial governor of the 16th century
- Tez Ilyas (born 1983), British stand-up comedian
- Zahid Ilyas, Pakistani naval officer

== See also ==
- Ilyas, given name
- Elias (surname)
