= Ilyas =

Iliyas
- Pronunciation: Arabic: [ʔɪljaːs]
- Gender: Male
- Language: Hebrew

Origin
- Meaning: Elijah
- Region of origin: Islamic world

Other names
- Alternative spelling: Elyas, Ilias, İlyas, Elias
- Variant forms: Elijah, Elias

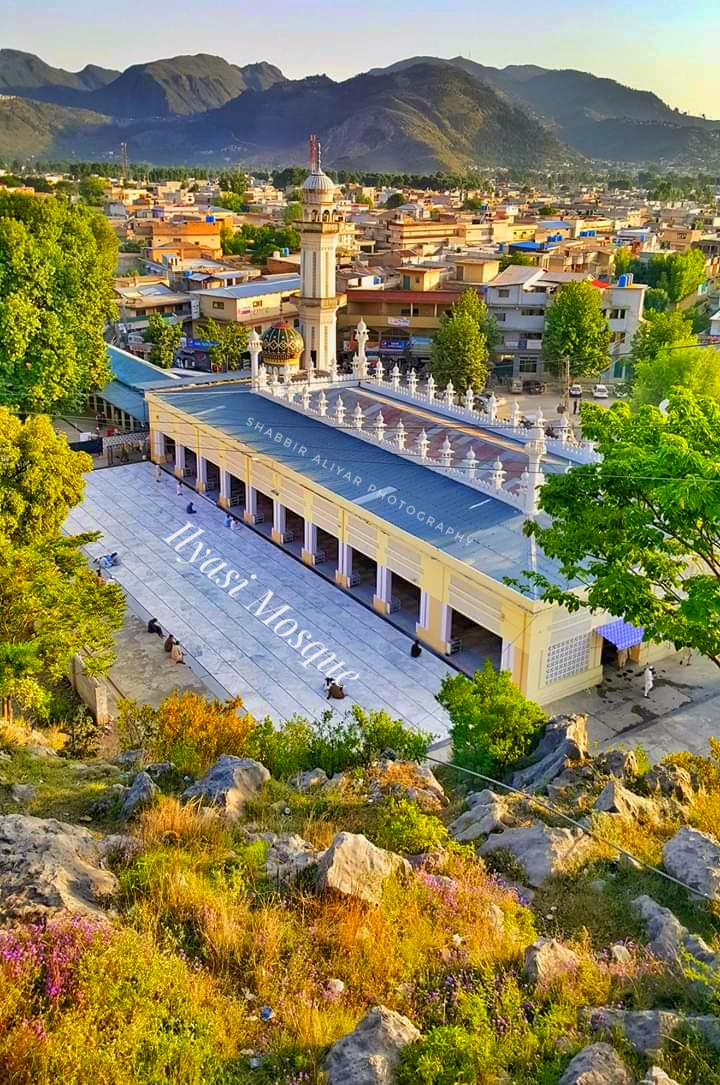
Historical place of Abbottabad Ilyasi Mosque

Ilyas (Arabic: إلياس) is a form of the masculine given name Elias or Elijah.

== Notable people with this given name ==
- Ilyas son of Mudar, ancestor of Muhammad
- Ilyas Ahmed (disambiguation), multiple people
- Ilyas Ahmed Bilour (1940–2024), Pakistani politician
- Ilyas Ansah (born 2004), German footballer
- Ilyas Babar (1926–2002), Indian athletic coach
- İlyas Demir (born 1985), Turkish martial artist
- Ilyas Gorchkhanov (1967–2005), Russian rebel leader
- Ilyas Gul (born 1968), Pakistani cricketer
- Ilyas Hussain Ibrahim (born 1957), Maldivian politician
- İlyas Kahraman (born 1976), Turkish footballer
- Ilyas Kanchan (born 1956), Bangladeshi actor
- Ilyas Kandhlawi (1885–1944), Indian Islamic scholar, founder of Tablighi Jamaat
- Ilyas Kashmiri (1964–2011), Pakistani Al-Qaeda operative
- Ilyas Osman Lugator (born 1967), Vice President of Puntland
- Ilyas Qadri (born 1950), Pakistani Islamic scholar
- Ilyas Shah Shamsuddin (died 1358), first Sultan of Bengal
- Ilyas Shurpayev (1975–2008), Russian journalist
- İlyas Şükrüoğlu (born 1966), Turkish freestyle wrestler
- İlyas Tüfekçi (born 1960), Turkish footballer
- Qaraja Ilyas, Safavid governor of Erivan from 1502 onwards

== See also ==
- İlyas Bey Mosque, a cultural heritage mosque of Turkey
- İlyas, Burdur, a village in Turkey
- Islamic view of Elijah
- Ilyas (surname)
