= Marcos Eduardo Elias =

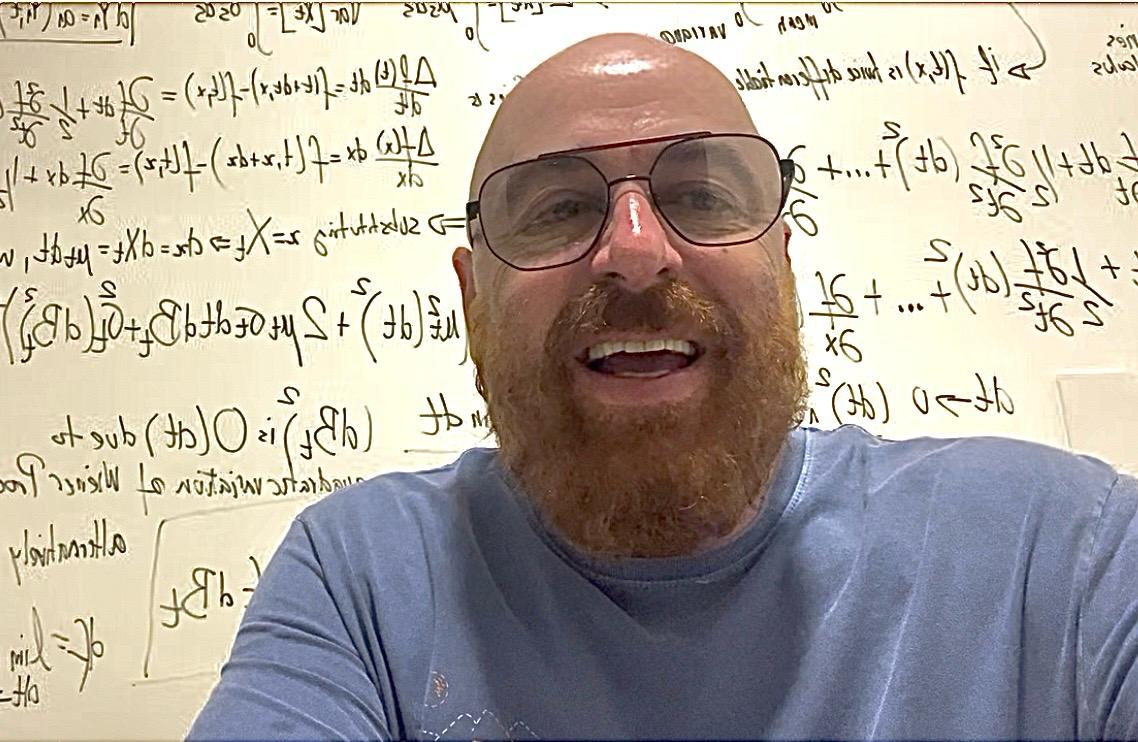
Marcos Eduardo Elias during a lecture on mathematics

Marcos Eduardo Elias (São Paulo, May 16, 1971) is a Brazilian entrepreneur with a background in mathematics, engineering, and financial markets. He has worked in investment and financial analysis and has been associated with initiatives related to quantum computing in Brazil.

== Career ==
Elias built his career in the financial sector, working as an investment analyst and later as a fund manager and entrepreneur. He held positions at institutions including Banco Bozano Simonsen and BNP Paribas, where he became chief analyst in Brazil. He was later involved in founding and development of investment and research firms such as Empiricus and other financial ventures. He has also worked in academia, teaching at institutions including Insper and Fundação Getulio Vargas.

Since April 2026, Elias has served as a collaborating researcher at the Institute of Advanced Studies of the University of São Paulo (IEA-USP), working on a project concerning immersive quantum computing and the integration of CPU, GPU, and QPU architectures.

== Legal issues ==
In 2018, Elias was arrested in Switzerland at the request of United States authorities in connection with an investigation into financial fraud. According to the United States Department of Justice, he was accused of participating in a scheme involving international bank transfers, the use of false identities, and offshore companies.

He was later extradited to the United States, where he faced charges related to wire fraud and aggravated identity theft. In 2019, he pleaded guilty and was sentenced by a federal court in New York to a 3 1/2 year term of imprisonment. The case was prosecuted by the U.S. Attorney's Office for the Southern District of New York.3 According to the official records, the scheme involved financial institutions in multiple jurisdictions and resulted in financial losses. Following the completion of his sentence, Elias returned to Brazil.
