= Julius Elias =

German art historian, literary historian and translator

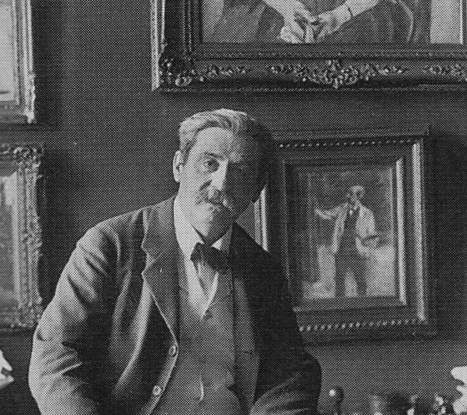
In his studio, Matthäikirchstraße 4, Berlin, about 1905

Julius Elias (12 July 1861 – 2 July 1927) was a German art historian, literary historian and translator.

He was born in Hoya and died in Berlin. his parents were Louis Juda Elias and Helene Elias. He was a lecturer in art history at the Technische Hochschule Charlottenburg, and also an art collector. As an art critic he favored Impressionism. In literature, he is among other known as a co-publisher of German translations of Henrik Ibsen (14 volumes, 1898-1909) and Bjørnstjerne Bjørnson (4 volumes, 1911).

Elias married Juliane (Julie) Levy, a successful author, in 1888.

With his wife Julie, Elias had a son, Ludwig Elias (1891–1942 also known as Karl Ludwig Elias), who was murdered by the Nazis at Auschwitz.

== Art collector ==
Among the paintings in Elias' collection was Monet's Garden at Giverny, which Galerie Aktuaryus sold to the Emil Georg Bührle in 1941 (inv 72).
