= TasteDive =

Entertainment recommendation engine

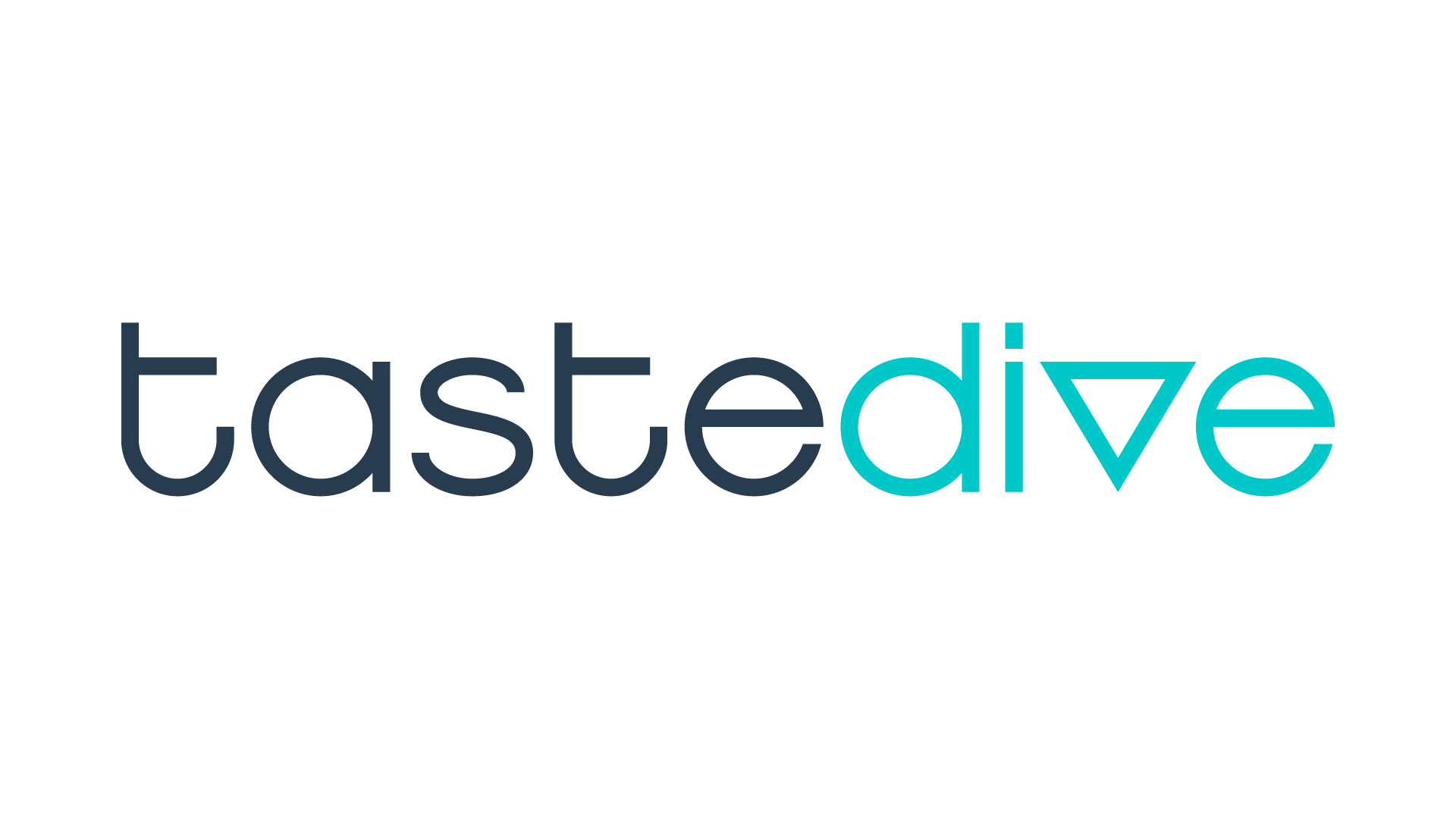
- Website type: Review aggregator
- Founders: Andrei Oghina; Felix Oghina
- Website: www.tastedive.com
- Commercial: Yes
- Registration: Free/subscription
- Launched: 2008
- Current status: Active

TasteDive (formerly named TasteKid) is an entertainment recommendation engine for films, TV shows, music, video games, books, people, places, and brands. It also has elements of a social media site; it allows users to connect with "tastebuds", people with like minded interests.

== History ==
TasteDive was founded in 2008 as TasteKid by brothers Andrei Oghina and Felix Oghina. In 2019, it was acquired by Qloo headquartered in NYC. "Qloo has built for developers and enterprises what TasteDive has built for individuals".

== Description ==
When a user types in the title of a film or TV show, the site's algorithm provides a list of similar content. It provides recommendations for TV shows to watch based on films liked by the user, and vice versa. It also provides recommendations for music, video games, and books, and includes film and TV trailers and music videos. An account is free and is not required to receive recommendations, but recommendations are more accurate for those with an account. The more a user explores the site, the more the site learns about the user's preferences and the better the results become. The site also has a social media aspect where one can see activity and gain recommendations from other users, how many others in the community like or dislike any recommendation, and how popular their tastes are within the TasteDive community.

The main competitors of TasteDive are Taste App, Trakt.tv and Tastoid.

== See also ==
- Rating site
- Recommender system
