= Federal Supreme Court =

Federal Supreme Court refers to the supreme court of a federal state. Specific courts with that name are:

- Federal Supreme Court of Switzerland
- Federal Supreme Court of the United Arab Emirates
- Federal Supreme Court of Iraq

== See also ==
- Federal court (disambiguation)
- Federal Court of Malaysia
- Federal Court of India (1937–1950)
  - Supreme Court of India (successor of the above)
- Supreme Court of the United States
- Supreme Federal Court of Brazil
- List of supreme courts by country
