= Ibrahim Ilyas =

Somali footballer (born 2000)

Personal information
- Full name: Ibrahim Ilyas Ahmed
- Date of birth: 5 March 2000 (age 26)
- Place of birth: Nairobi, Kenya
- Position: Forward

Team information
- Current team: KMC
- Number: 10

Senior career*
Years	Team	Apps	(Gls)
- Horseed
2023–	KMC	7	(1)

International career^{‡}
2023–	Somalia	3	(0)
- * Club domestic league appearances and goals ‡ National team caps and goals as of 16:45, 3 April 2022 (UTC)

Ibrahim Ilyas Ahmed (Somali: Ibraahim Ilyaas Axmed; born 5 March 2000) is a Somali professional footballer who plays as a midfielder for Tanzanian Premier League club KMC. Born a Somali refugee in Kenya, he represents the Somalia national team.

== Club career ==
In 2020, Ilyas represented the region of Banaadir at the Inter-State Football Tournament.

In 2021, Ilyas signed for Horseed, winning the Somali First Division in his first season at the club.

== International career ==
On 23 March 2022, Ilyas made his debut for Somalia in a 3–0 loss against Eswatini in the qualification for the 2023 Africa Cup of Nations.
