= Manuel de Elías =

Mexican composer and conductor

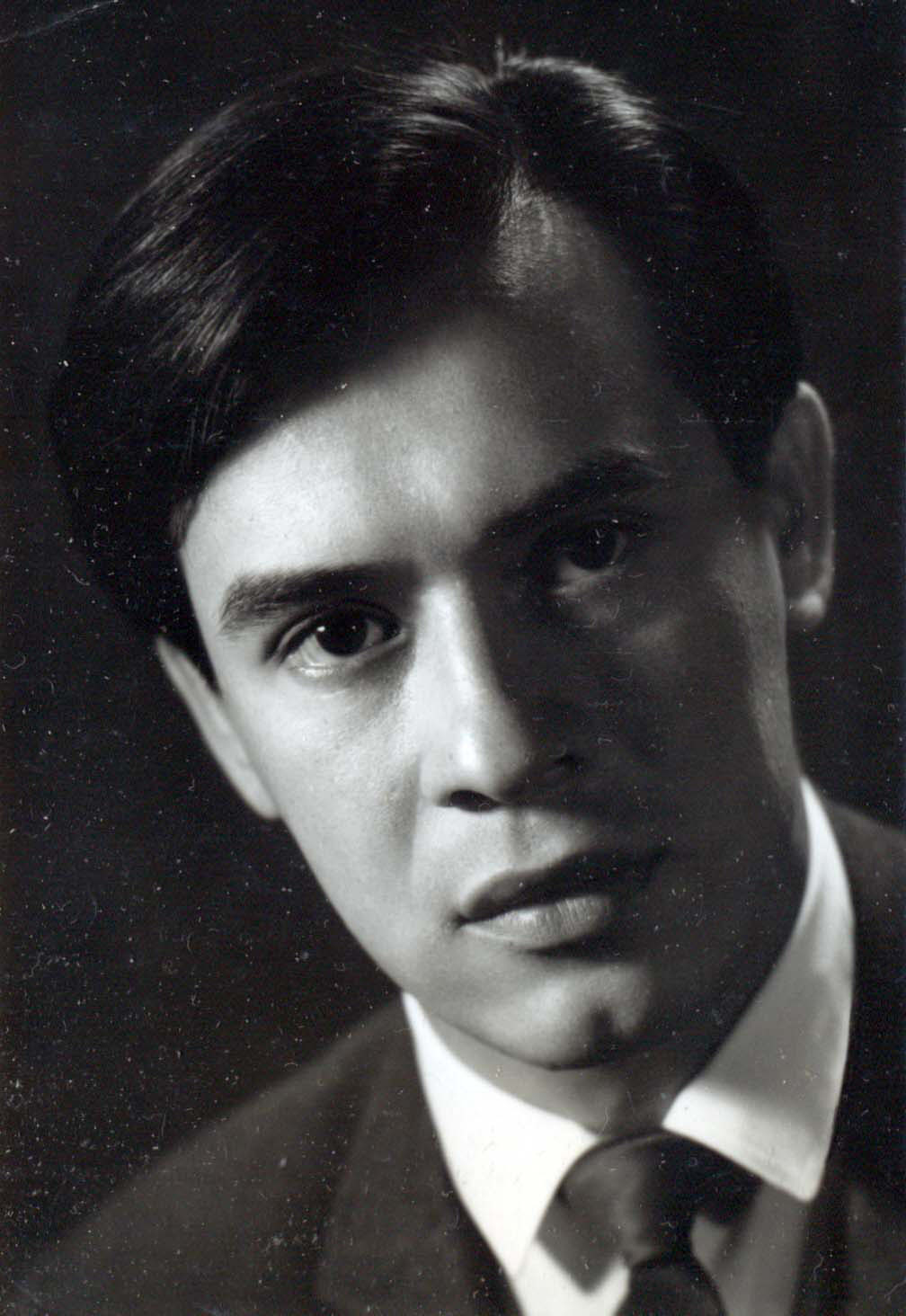

Manuel Jorge de Elías (born June 5, 1939) is a Mexican composer and conductor. He initially studied under his father, composer Alfonso de Elías, and then studied under Marie and Karlheinz Stockhausen. He was the founder of the Music Institute at the University of Veracruz, which was established in 1975. In 1988, he founded the Jalisco Philharmonic Orchestra. He directed the Las Rosas Conservatory in Morelian in 1990-91. In 1992 he was awarded the National Prize for Arts and Sciences of Mexico.

He has produced 175 scores. Many of his works make use of serialism and images or graphics in the scores. His Mictlán-Tlatelolco was dedicated to the victims of the 1985 earthquake in Mexico City.

He conducted the premiere of Alex Panamá's guitar concerto, Destellos de una Vida.

== Selected works ==
- Concierto de cámara for Viola, Percussion and String Orchestra (1992)
- Elegía for Viola and Piano (1962)
- Vitral 1 for chamber orchestra
- Vitral 3 for Orchestra
- Divertimento for Drum kit
- Aphorismus 1 for Choir a capella
- Aphorismus 3 for solo Flute
- Preludio (Pieza de cámara No.1) for Viola Solo (1962)
- Preludio for Viola Solo (1976)
- Sonate 1 for Piano
- Sonate 2 for Piano
- Sonate 3 for Trumpet, trombone, and horn
- Sonate 4 for Orchestra
