= Alfonso de Elías =

Mexican composer

Alfonso de Elías (1902–1984) was a composer, pianist and pedagogue. He was born and died in Mexico City.

He completed his musical studies at the National Conservatory of Music ( 1915-1927 ) then belonging to the National University of Mexico, where his main teachers were Aurelio Barrios and Morales (composition and organ), Rafael J. Tello and Gustavo Campa ( composition), and José Velázquez ( piano).

He established a private school in the early 1930s that focused on teaching piano, theoretical courses, and musical composition while continuing his work as a pianist. From then until a week before his death, he developed most of his work. However, in 1958, he joined the School of Music of the National Autonomous University of Mexico as a teacher of piano and harmony until 1964. He then taught at the National Conservatory of Music centered at the National University of Mexico.

He is considered the last composer of the Romantic school of his country. He is the author of an extensive production of chamber music, vocal, choral, piano, religious music, and so on; including three symphonies (1926, 1934, and 1963), the Symphonic Triptych "The Enchanted Garden" (1924), Variations on "Las Mañanitas" (1927), the mythical legend of "The Alley Ave Maria" for mixed choir, organ, and orchestra (1930), the Ballet "The Biniguendas de Plata" (1933), the Suite for Chamber Orchestra "Tlalmanalco" (1936), Requiem (1938), the symphonic poem "Cacahuamilpa" (1940), Concertino for Violin and Orchestra (1967), two string quartets (1930 and 1961), a sonata for violin and piano (1935), sonata for organ (1962–1963), Sonata for piano (1969), and so on.

His son is the composer Manuel de Elías.
