= Sheila Elias =

American artist

Sheila Elias (born in Chicago) is an American artist. Her works have been featured in exhibitions across North America and at the Liberty show at the Louvre Museum in Paris.

== Biography ==
Elias graduated from the Art Institute of Chicago, and she lives and works in Miami, Florida. As an artist and art historian, Elias works with the layers of life and art history, seeking in it a connection between art aesthetics and social consciousness.

Elias has been doing installations reflecting her studio's neighborhood since the 1980s and she has received recognition for her blend of social consciousness and aesthetics. Her work spans the disciplines of painting, digital mixed media, sculpture, installation and performance.

== Publications ==
Elias, Sheila; Frank, Peter; Anderson-Spivy, Alexandra; Lowe Art Museum Staff (July 1997). Sheila Elias: Secret Gardens. Lowe Art Museum. ISBN 978-0-9648614-1-1.

== Works in public collections ==
- Frost Art Museum, Miami, Florida
- American Bankers Inc., Miami, Florida
- Capital Bank, Los Angeles; Miami, Florida
- Brooklyn Museum, Brooklyn, New York.
- Chase Manhattan Bank Collection, New York.
- First Los Angeles Bank Collection, Los Angeles
- Kunsan Contemporary Museum, Korea.
- Miami Dade Community College, Miami, Florida
- Paramount Pictures, Los Angeles
- Security Pacific Bank Collection, Los Angeles
- Vesti Corporation, Boston
- University of Michigan, Dearborn, Michigan
- Bass Museum of Art, Miami Beach, Florida
- Lowe Art Museum, University of Miami, Miami, Florida
- American Bankers Life Assurance Company of Florida.
- Artforum Culture Foundation, Thessaloniki.
