= Christopher Elias =

Christopher J. Elias is the president of Global Development at the Bill & Melinda Gates Foundation since 2012, and the former president and CEO of the Program for Appropriate Technology in Health, also known as PATH, a nonprofit organization that improves global health by ensuring that innovations in science and technology are available to low income groups and developing countries, a role he held from 2000 to 2011.

== Education ==
Elias received his MD from Creighton University, completed his post-graduate training in internal medicine at the University of California, San Francisco, and received his MPH from the University of Washington.

== Career ==
Prior to his role at the Bill & Melinda Gates Foundation and PATH, Dr. Elias worked as a senior associate at the International Programs Division of the Population Council. He served as country representative of Thailand.

== Other activities ==
- Exemplars in Global Health, Member of the Senior Advisory Board (since 2020)
- Creighton University, member of the board of trustees
- Centers for Disease Control and Prevention (CDC), member of the advisory committee to the director
- University of Washington, member of the global health external advisory board
- Family Planning 2020 (FP2020), co-chair of the reference group
- Scaling Up Nutrition Movement, member of the lead group (since 2016, appointed by United Nations Secretary-General Ban Ki-moon)

== Recognition ==
- 2005 – Social Entrepreneur of the Year, awarded by the Schwab Foundation
