= Nedaa Elias =

Syrian artist and writer

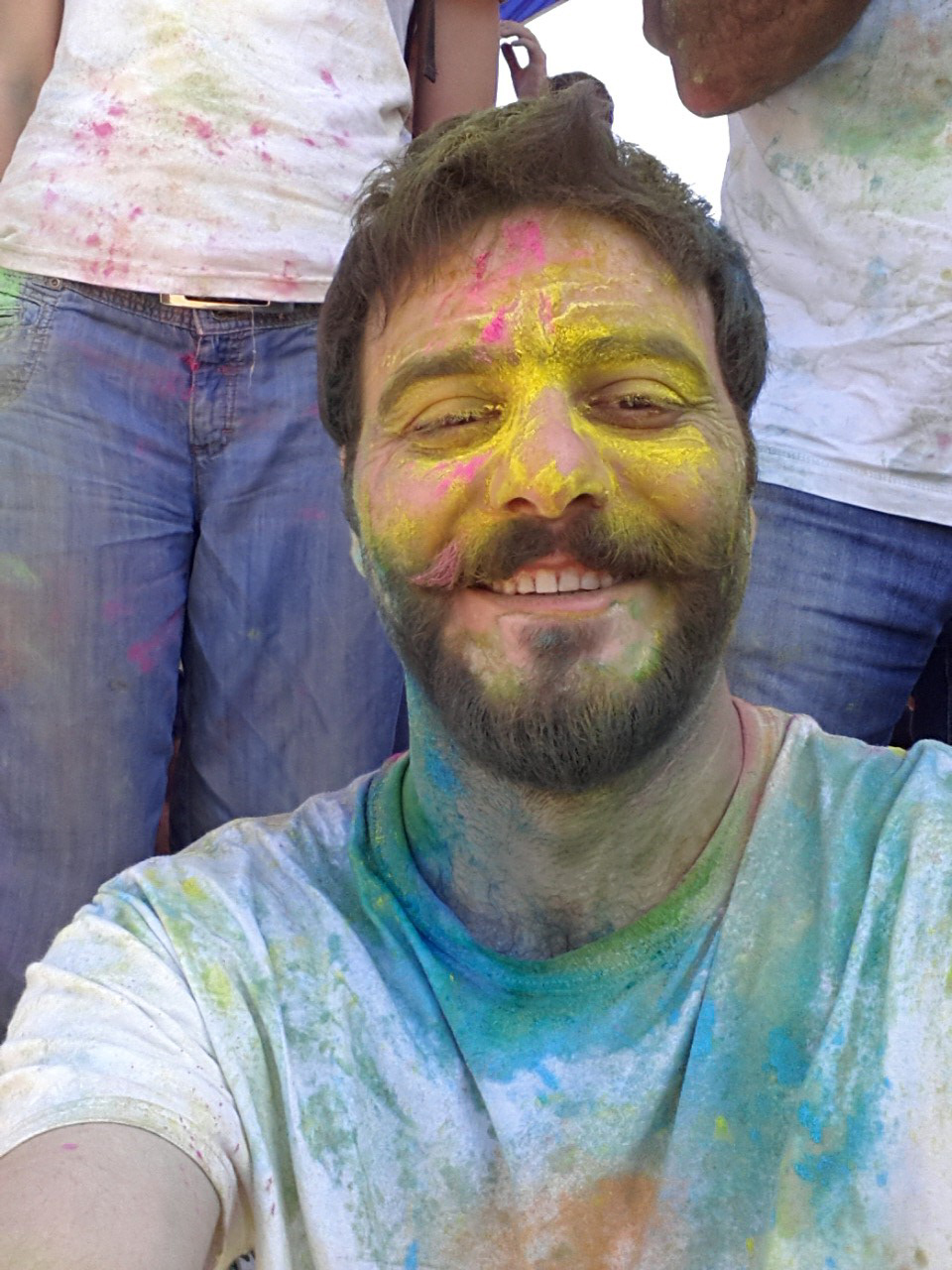
- Nedaa Elias In Color Run (or Holi) 2014.
- Born: January 15, 1981; Damascus, Syria
- Movement: Installation Art

Nedaa Elias (Arabic: نداء الياس; born 15 January 1981 in Damascus) is a Syrian artist and writer whose works address environmental and cultural concerns pertaining to contemporary Middle Eastern societies. Subjects previously explored by Elias include the discontinuation of the usage of the Arabic script, as well as the effect of bird migration on the gulf’s economy.

== Biography ==
Nedaa Elias studied Fine Art at the faculty of Art and Design at the University of Jordan and later obtained his Masters of Fine Arts in Visual Communication Design from Istanbul Bilgi University, Turkey. Nedaa Elias focuses on public installation art. In 2017 he was nominated as best solo international artist at World Art Dubai where he featured his installation, Pursuit of Abjad. As per an article published in Al Bayan Newspaper in the United Arab Emirates, his creations represent the relationship between people and culture from different perspectives where he invites the audience to interact with the works and interpret the outcomes. For his research on Paul Klee's color theory, Nedaa Elias was cited by Art history scholar Sztabińska Paulina in her book "The performative turn in the visual arts - The art of Paul Klee" and The Daily Hatch.

== Exhibitions ==
- UAE Pearl, public installation exhibition featuring the migration of birds in the UAE, Zabeel Park, Dubai, United Arab Emirates, 2016
- Pursuit of Abjad public installation exhibition, DIFC Art Nights, Dubai, United Arab Emirates, 2017
- Pursuit of Abjad, public installation exhibition, World Art Dubai, Dubai, United Arab Emirates, 2017
- Down the Rabbit Hole public installation exhibition, DIFC Art Nights, Dubai, United Arab Emirates, 2019

== Publications ==
- Guernica Dance, article, Al Rai Newspaper, Jordan
- Ektemal Triology, A reading into the Clay Artworks of Prof. Khaled Al Hamza, Afkar, Jordan
- Paul Klee Making the Visible, article, Al Tashkeel, Emirates Fine Arts Society – United Arab Emirates

== Artworks ==
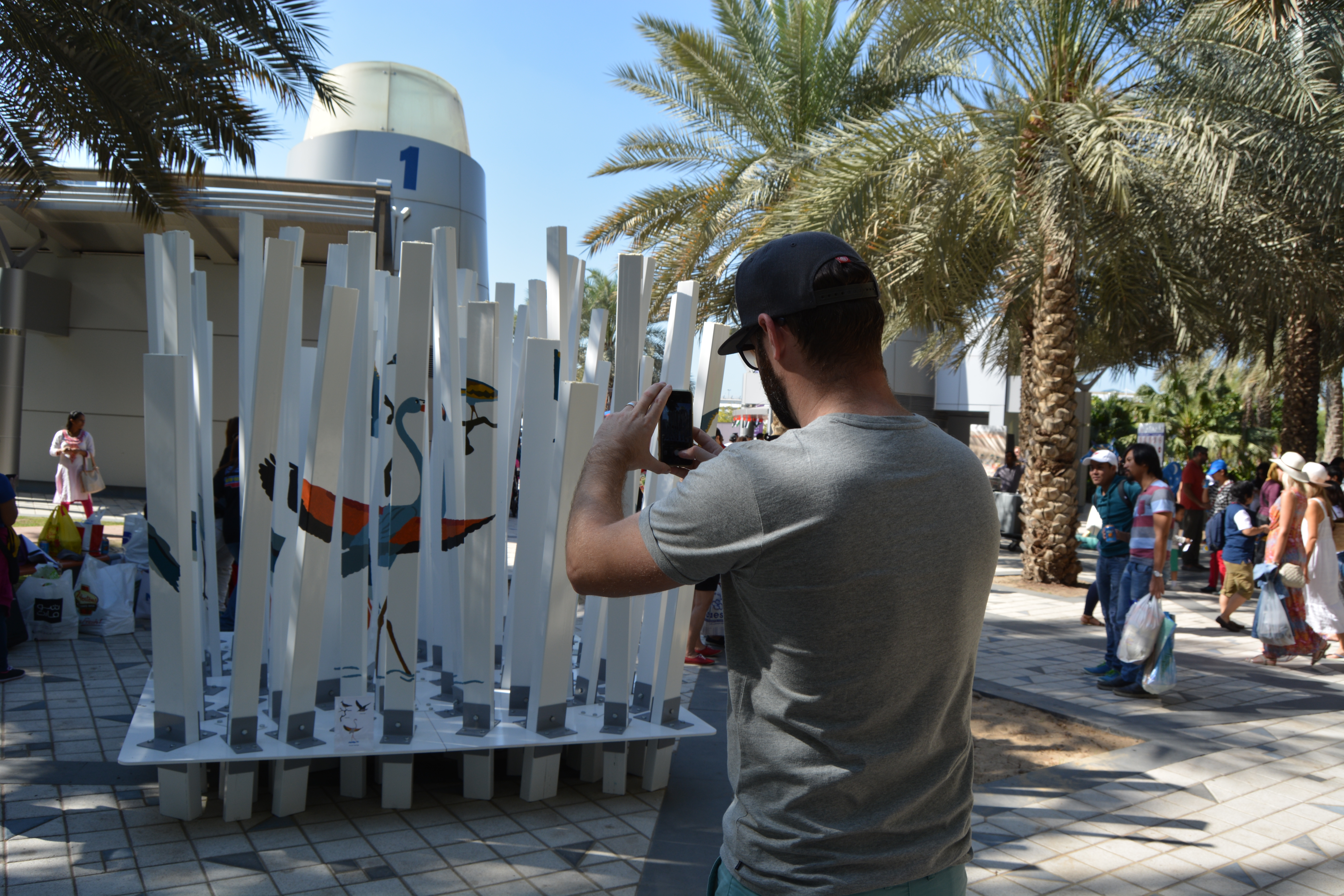
Tourist at Zabeel Park taking photos for the UAE Pearl installation

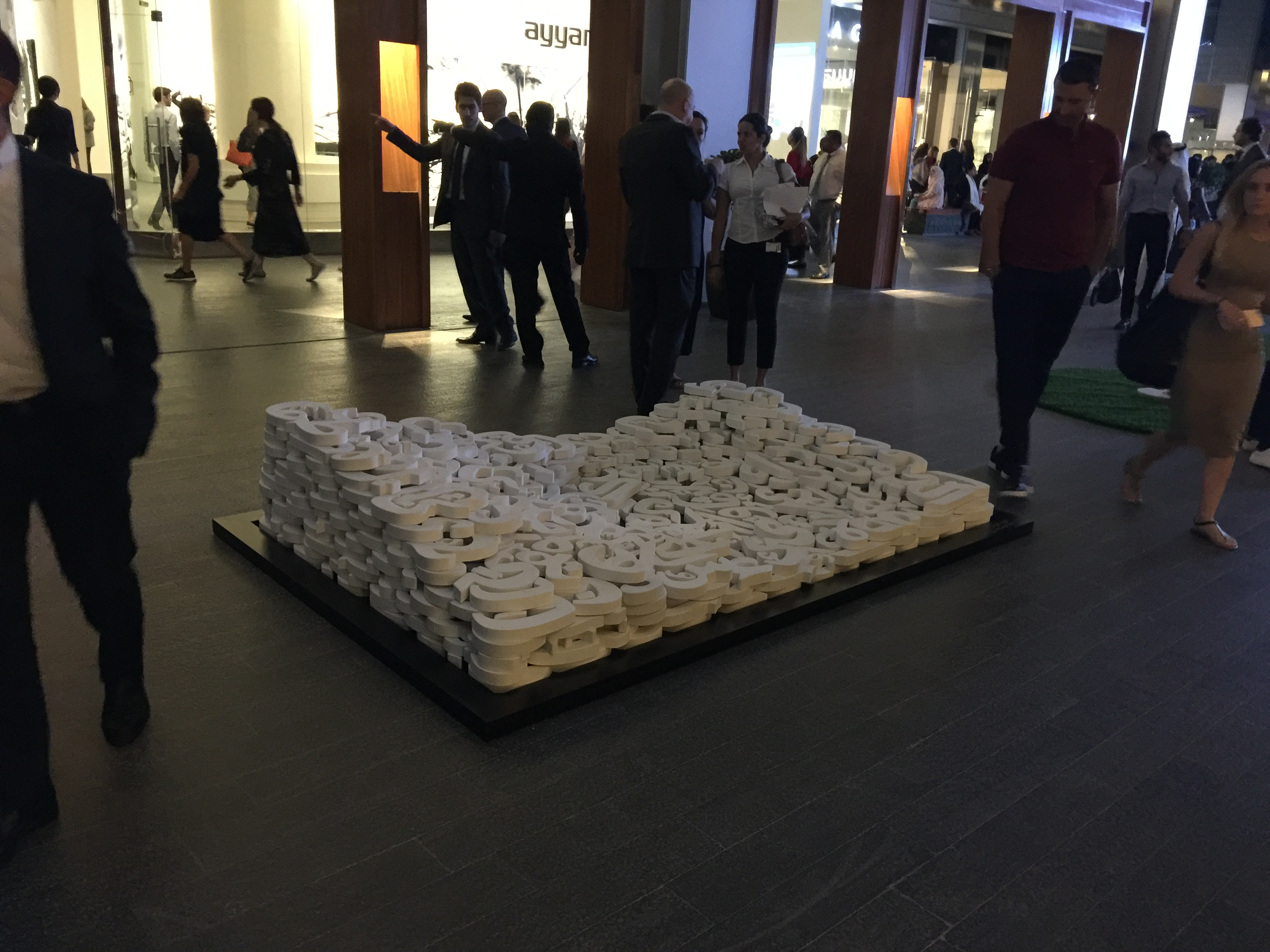
An overall view of the Pursuit of Abjad installation artwork at the DIFC Artnight Event.

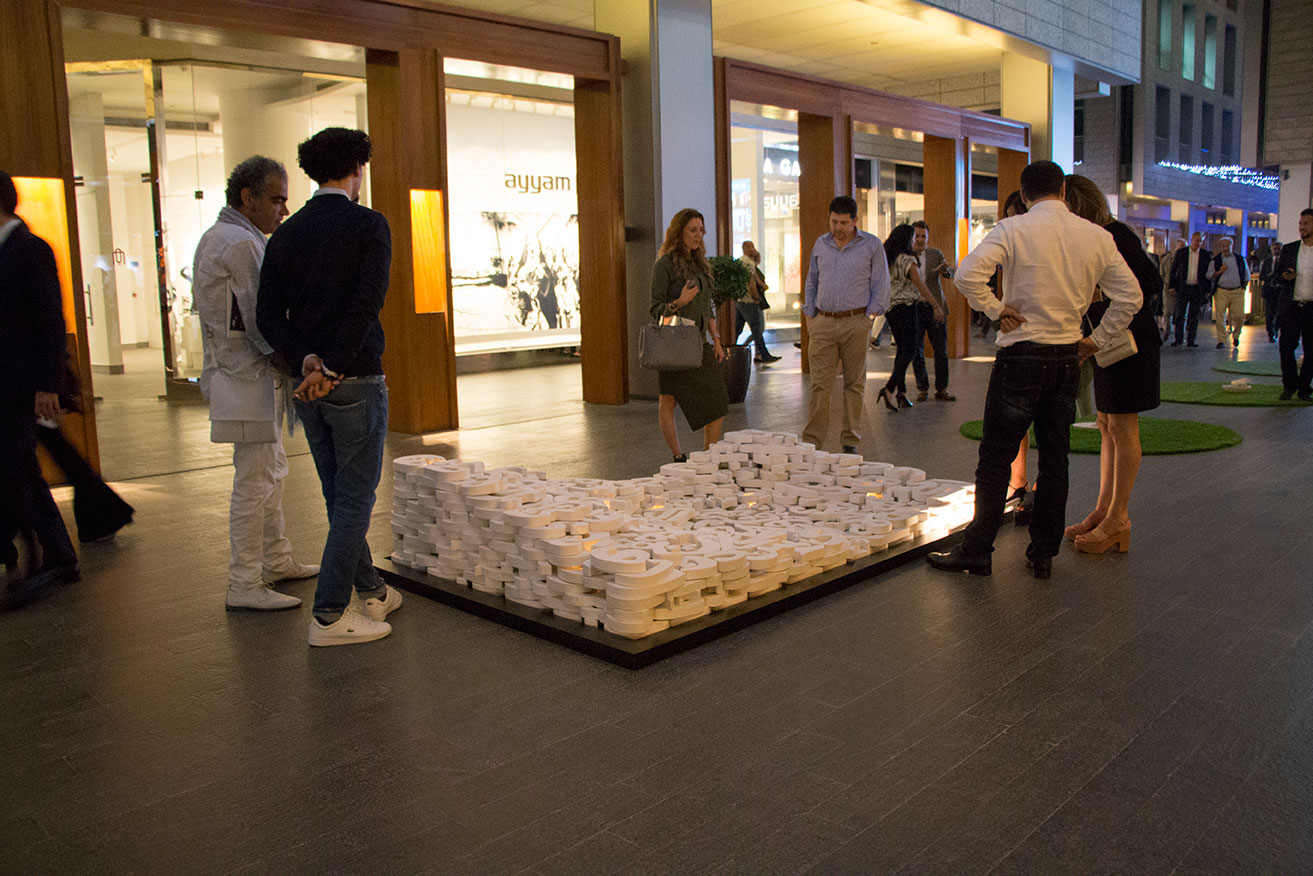
People discussing the installation artwork Pursuit of Abjad at the DIFC Artnight Event

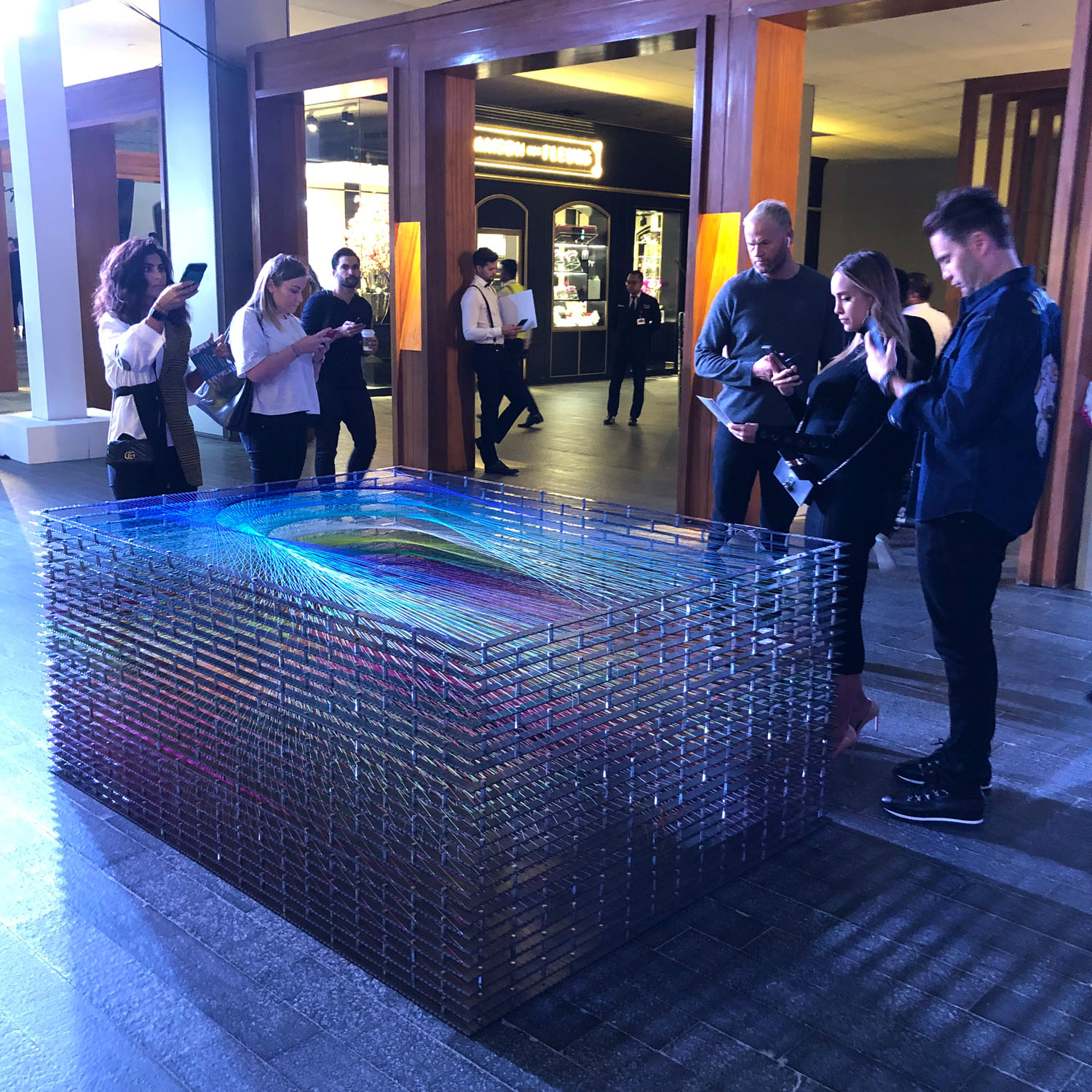
A night view of the Rabbit Hole installation artwork at the DIFC Artnight 2019

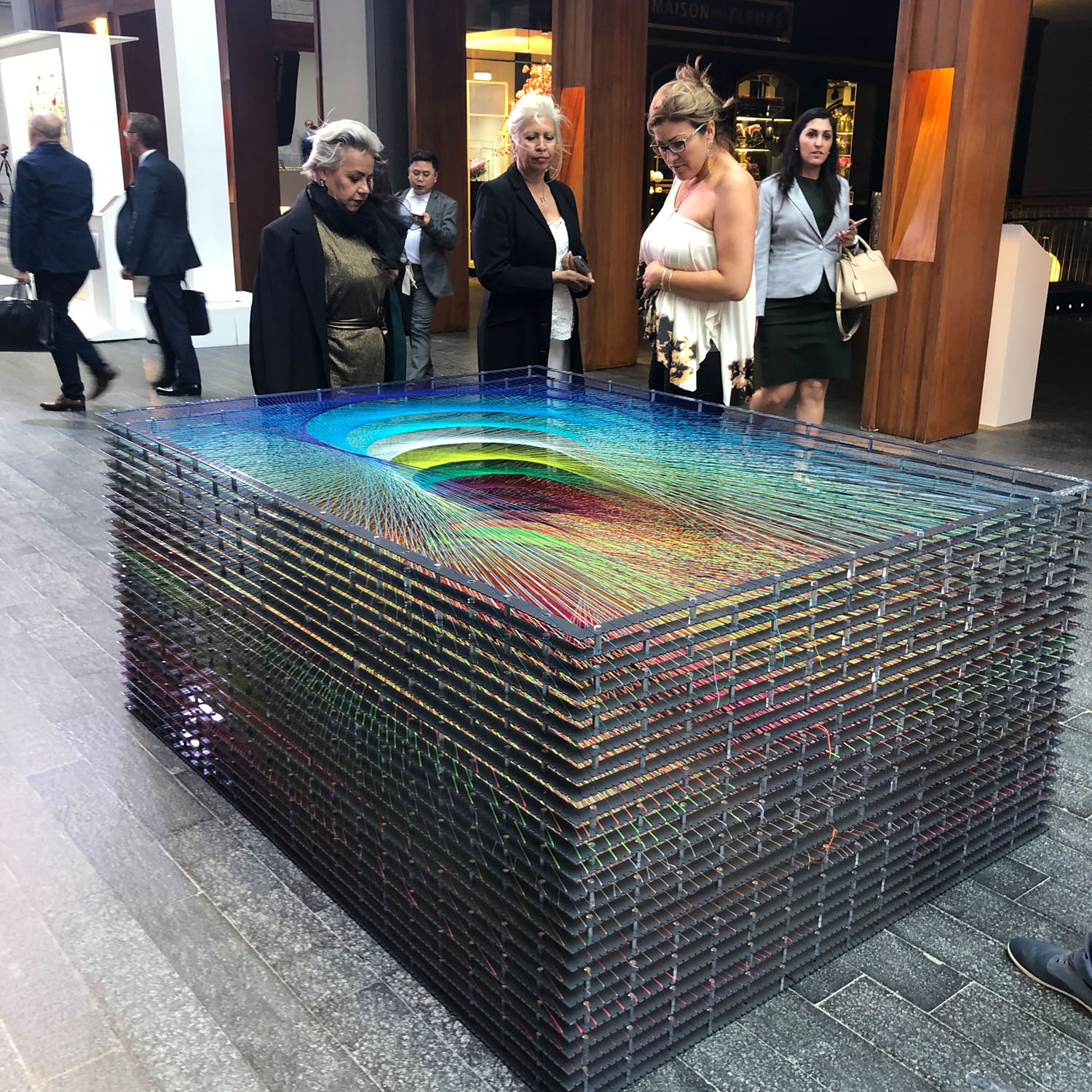
People getting a closer look at the installation artwork Rabbit Hole at the DIFC Artnight 2019

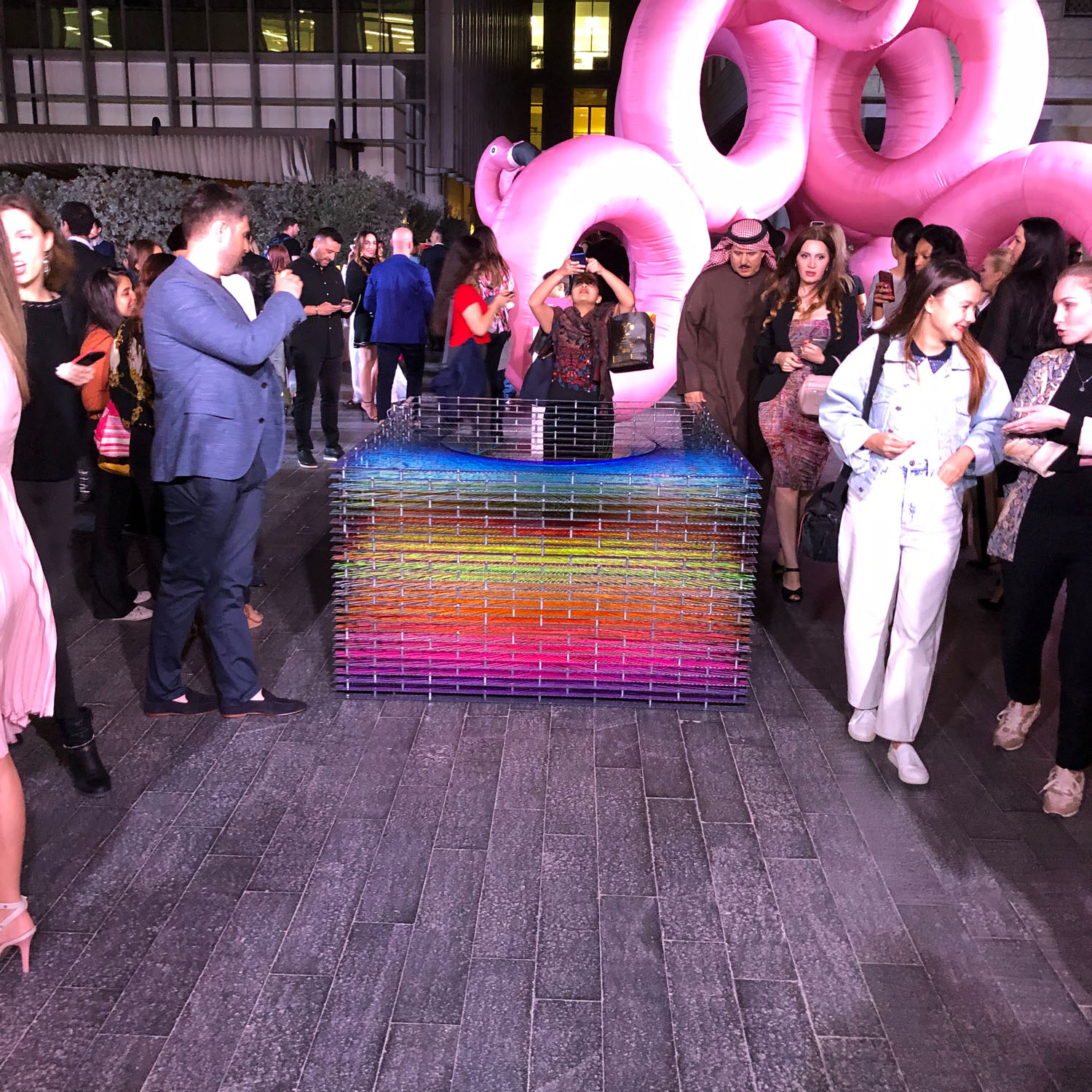
People gathering around the installation artwork Rabbit Hole at the DIFC Artnight 2019 with another work (flamingos) showing behind

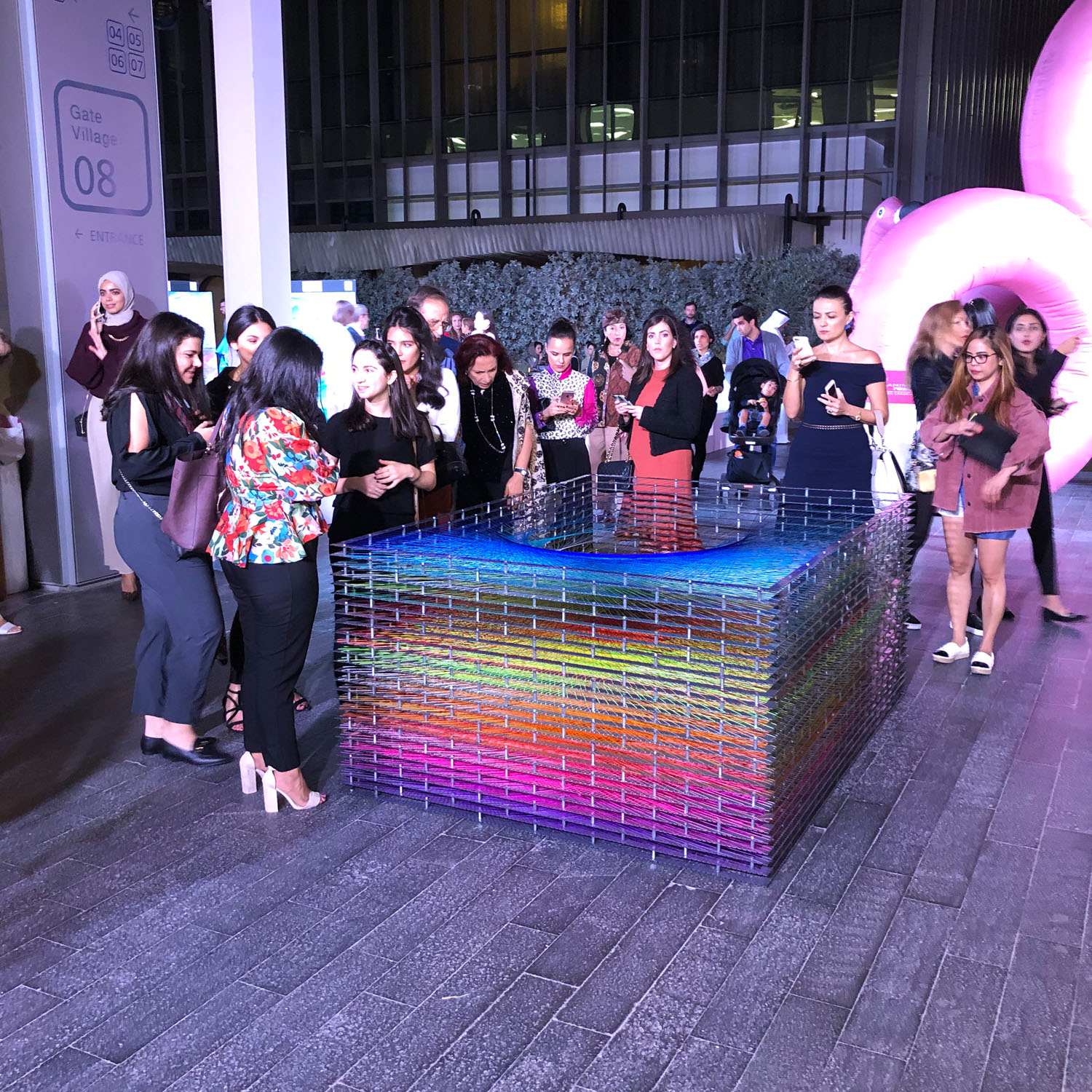
Ladies enjoy the getting photos of the colorful installation artwork Rabbit Hole at the DIFC Artnight 2019
