= Vic Elias =

American poet

- Born: 1948; Chicago, Illinois
- Died: 2006 (aged 57–58)
- Occupation: Physicist

Vic Elias (1948–2006) was a poet who was born in Chicago, Illinois, and emigrated to Canada in 1979. Settling in London, Ontario, he was a professor of Applied Mathematics at the University of Western Ontario. He was also an Affiliate Member of the Perimeter Institute for Theoretical Physics in Waterloo, Ontario. In 1997 he received the Edward G. Pleva Award for Excellence in Teaching, UWO's highest teaching award. In addition to his work in mathematics and physics, Vic Elias was an accomplished poet whose work appeared in a number of literary publications including Parchment, Tabula Rasa, and Afterthoughts. He is the author of three full-length collections and one chapbook of poetry. His poems have dealt with his Jewish identity and spiritual themes, humorous anecdotes, and in his final works, his struggle with cancer, which took his life in May 2006.

== Books ==
- 1991: Reflected Scenery from Where My Eyes Should Be, Moonstone Press ISBN 0-920259-37-5
- 2004: Drinking with Old Men, South Western Ontario Poetry, ISBN 0-919139-33-7
- 2006: A Game of Jeopardy, South Western Ontario Poetry, ISBN 0-919139-36-1

== Chapbooks ==
- 2006: The Cataracts of Troy, South Western Ontario Poetry
