= Ariel Elias =

American comedian

Ariel Elias is an American comedian. She first gained prominence after a viral video showed her handling a heckler who threw a can of alcoholic seltzer at her onstage. She has appeared on numerous late night television talk shows. Her comedic work has drawn on her experiences growing up Jewish in Kentucky, being married, and being a millennial woman.

== Early life and education ==
Elias grew up in Lexington, Kentucky. Her first name was often mispronounced "Earl" like Jason Lee's character in My Name Is Earl. Her father was descended from Jews who were expelled from Spain during the Inquisition and went to Greece before immigrating to the United States. Her grandfather spoke Ladino. Elias was influenced by Lois Lowry's The Giver, which emphasized that "in order to experience the joys of life, we also have to carry the pain". Elias attended Tulane University.

== Career ==
Elias began performing stand-up comedy while in college in New Orleans. She performed as the warm-up comedian for the set of The Marvelous Mrs. Maisel.

In 2020, Jason Zinoman of the New York Times described Elias as "a sly young comic from Kentucky".

In 2022, Elias was performing at a club in New Jersey when a heckler criticized her left-leaning politics. After the heckler's boyfriend threw a can at her, Elias calmly picked up the can and chugged the rest. Elias posted the video on social media, drawing compliments from comedians including Jim Gaffigan, Patton Oswalt and Whitney Cummings. After the incident, Elias was featured on Jimmy Kimmel Live and The Late Show with Stephen Colbert.

In 2025, Elias released her comedy special “A Jewish Star” on YouTube. She recorded her special in Vermont.

== Awards ==
- Just For Laughs Comedy Festival "New Face" award, 2021
- Paste Magazine’s Best Comedians of 2022

== Personal life ==
Elias resides in Queens, New York with her husband and dog.
