= Josep Samsó Elías =

Spanish Roman Catholic priest

Blessed Josep Samsó Elías
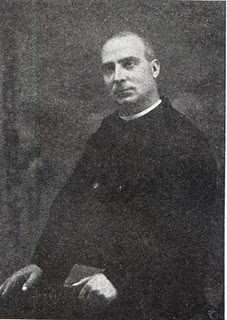
- c. 1920.

Martyr
- Born: 17 January 1887; Castellbisbal, Vallès Occidental, Barcelona, Spain
- Died: 1 September 1936 (aged 49); Mataró, Barcelona, Spain
- Venerated in: Roman Catholic Church
- Beatified: 23 January 2010, Basilica of Santa Maria de Mataró, Barcelona, Spain by Archbishop Angelo Amato
- Feast: 1 September

Josep Samsó Elías (17 January 1887 – 1 September 1936) was a Spanish Roman Catholic priest who was killed during the Spanish Civil War. Samsó was known for being a brilliant student who excelled in his studies and later in his pastoral duties; he served as a parish priest in several areas and was better known for his catechesis classes which were considered among the best in the nation. He was a lover of liturgical celebrations that were solemn and used his resources to decorate the interior of his church better. These contributions would later garner it the title of a minor basilica.

His initial entrance into his Mataró parish was not well-received with most of the parishioners taking a disliking to him because his much-loved predecessor had retired leaving the parish with an uncertain future without his care. But Samsó managed to win over the parishioners who respected his work and lauded his holiness.

His murder prompted calls for him to be beatified with some having taken the view that there would be disbelief that he could be beatified if he had not died in hatred of the faith. The process was launched in the late 1950s and he was titled as a Servant of God. But Pope Paul VI closed all processes stemming from the civil war in 1964 because greater investigation was needed to determine which priests and religious died in hatred of their faith. Pope John Paul II reactivated all processes later on. The cause for Samsó continued until Pope Benedict XVI approved for him to be beatified; the then-Archbishop Angelo Amato presided over the beatification in Barcelona in 2010.

== Life ==
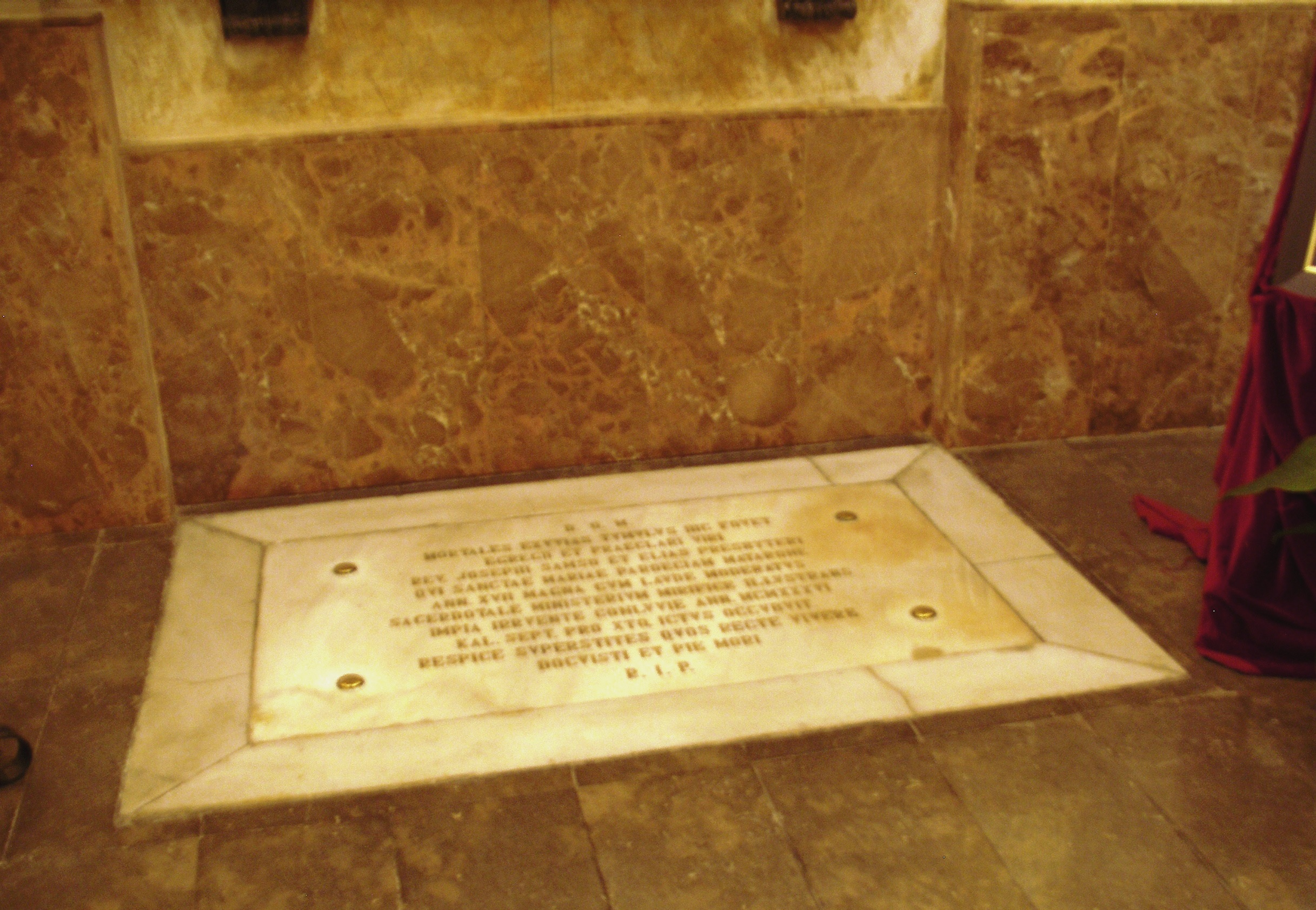
Tomb in Barcelona.

=== Childhood and education ===
Josep Samsó Elías was born in Castellbisbal on 17 January 1887 as the first of two children to the pharmacist Jaume Samsó Olivella and Josefa Elías Puig; he was baptized on 22 January and later received his Confirmation some months following on 20 October. His sister Montserrat was born in 1888 and his father later died on 12 November 1894. His widowed mother had nothing to support her children with and so approached her childless sister in the neighboring town of Rubí asking for her help. Her sister and her husband accepted and helped raise the children at their home.

Samsó attended a Marist-run school while his sister attended the Teresian Sisters' school and he there studied Latin among other subjects. Around this point, that he desired entering into the priesthood and this passion was well known to others. He earned repute as a brilliant student and excelled in particular in mathematics. In 1900 his mother moved with her children to Barcelona where she and her daughter sought work as seamstresses to provide for Samsó's education as a priest. In 1900 when he turned thirteen he began his ecclesial studies for entering the priesthood.

There came an instance during the course of his studies where he was felled with a sharp pain in his chest. His doctor prescribed medicine to him but warned that if the medicine failed he would not have much longer to live. His terrified mother ran to the church in Barcelona dedicated to Nuestra Señora del Sagrado Corazón and prostrated herself before the image. It was before the image she promised to subscribe to the shrine's periodical if her son recovered. Her son regained his health one month later and was able to resume his studies. Samsó often gave private lessons to others in order to earn what he could in order to support his mother. He would sometimes be asked to stand in for professors due to his academic brilliance and would go on to earn his theological degree on 25 June 1909.

=== Priesthood ===
Not long after he graduated, the Bishop of Barcelona Joan Josep Laguarda i Fenollera asked him to serve as his private aide and not long after this in 1909 elevated him into the diaconate. He received his ordination into the priesthood on 12 March 1910 in the Barcelona Cathedral from his bishop with a dispensation since Samsó had not reached the canonical age requirement for ordination; he celebrated his first Mass in the parish on Calabria Street in Barcelona on 19 March. His spiritual director soon interceded with the bishop asking him to relieve Samsó of his duties as his aide upon seeing that Samsó had great potential as a parish priest. The bishop did this and appointed him as the assistant priest for Sant Julià d'Argentona on 13 July 1910. The pastor there was ageing and so he took over catechism for the parish due to it having been neglected.

In his parish lived a man who was opposed to religion and this led to his wife attending Mass in secret. The man's friends told him that the new priest for the parish - Samsó - was a kind man who was excellent in teaching catechism to children. The man therefore decided to allow his wife to send their children to the priest for catechism and she agreed on the condition that she be allowed freedom to attend Mass to which he accepted. The woman told Samsó about this to which he said that if she asked the Blessed Mother for her intercession then her husband would be converted to the faith. Samsó soon after organized a retreat for the Spiritual Exercises but found that he needed more than the six applicants he had. The man learnt of this and told his astonished wife that "if he came to invite me, I would sign up". He happened to run into the assistant priest and so asked the priest about the number of applicants. The assistant priest admitted there were few and not enough leading to the man recruiting more allowing for 32 in total including himself.

The appointment of the new Bishop of Barcelona Enrique Reig Casanova saw the latter organize a competition to select a new priest for the Saint Joan de Mediona parish. Samsó prevailed but during his interview with the bishop found himself reproached for being an independent spirit who refused to remain as the aide of the previous bishop. But the new bishop soon realized he made malicious remarks and so appointed him as the church's priest on 11 January 1917. He arrived to a frigid welcome since his predecessor in that church was well-loved and his stewardship of the parish respected. Not long after his appointment a child who was eleven died and his parents requested a white coffin for his funeral Mass. But Samsó told them that liturgical norms permitted a white coffin for children who died before the age of reason and so denied them their request leading to people threatening to throw rocks at him after the funeral for what was perceived to be inappropriate behavior and poor judgement. It was no secret to him or others that he was disliked when he first took over but people soon warmed to him and came to respect his educational qualities as well as his holiness.

The pastor for the Santa Maria parish in Mataró died in August 1919 and the Archbishop of Barcelona wished to send him there as an administrator. He was unsure about this and asked for time to think about it but his spiritual director advised him to accept it and so he arrived there on 30 August. In his church he added extra confessional booths in order to facilitate better access to the sacrament of penance. Samsó continued his catechism classes at his new post and he hoped that his students would become catechists themselves. He became the archpriest for Santa Maria de Mataró on 11 January 1924. He had great love for the liturgical celebrations and insisted on their perfection while likewise dedicating himself to the interior decoration of the church. These efforts bore great fruit in 1928 when Pope Pius XI designated the church as a minor basilica.

Samsó was tall and kept his hair as short as he could. His manner was grave but he tried to often this with his smile. He had a strong temperament that made him demanding of himself and sometimes of others. He read and meditated upon the works of Saint Francis de Sales. Samsó also wrote a guide for new catechists which had been prepared sometime before or around March 1936. He died before publication and it was not published until 1940; it was entitled Guide for Catechists. He slept on a straw mattress and kept cilices on his bedside table when he was not wearing them. He would wake up at 5:00am and would celebrate Mass at 6:00am before working in his office and receiving visitors until noon. He would take an hour's rest following lunch and in the afternoon would visit hospitals or schools. He then attended meetings in the evening before going to bed at 11:00pm.

=== Arrest and death ===
The growing anti-religious sentiment took a turn on 6 October 1934 when armed men burst into his basilica threatening to kill him. He was there in conversation with one priest and two others. The men pointed their guns at them and ordered them to set fire to the church. Samsó stepped forward and said he would rather die than do that leading to the men setting fire to the church themselves before fleeing. The neighbors rushed to help put the fire out but the incident caused concern for Samsó. During the night on 18–19 July 1936 came another incident where shots rang out from officers who had come to search the parish residence under the false belief that priests were harboring weapons. Samsó was seated on a bench and encouraged the officers to search but pointed out that the Church did not believe in weapons and sought to protect people from.

He hid in the apartment that some of his friends lived in due to the growing violence that the outbreak of the Spanish Civil War caused. But he did not wish to jeopardize his friends so on 30 July 1936 disguised himself as a businessman and left the house. He had a fake moustache on and colored his hair while wearing dark glasses and holding a briefcase and cigarette. Samsó hurried to the train station and there asked a woman what time the train would leave. But this woman identified his voice and rushed to alert the militiamen that Samsó was attempting to flee. He confirmed who he was to them and the men took him to the town hall to be tried; no official reason was given for his arrest. He was arrested and then imprisoned while a fake court convicted him and condemned him to death towards the end of that summer. Samsó recited rosaries with the prisoners and heard their confessions but would also encourage them in their despair. He said to them on one occasion: "Do not be afraid - I'm the one who's been chosen for the sacrifice. Blessed be God!" He was locked in a room at first with ten others that would later become 35 people in total and his entire imprisonment would last little over a month. On 15 August he received the Eucharist for the first time while imprisoned and on 29 August another priest joined him in imprisonment. The two - who once quarreled over a previous parish initiative - confessed to each other and that priest (who survived) later said: "Father Samsó died as a saint, as he had lived".

Three men retrieved him from the prison for his execution in the morning on 1 September and he spoke with them as he was being led out. One of the men said none of them wished to cause him harm but had to follow their orders to which Samsó told them to follow their orders. He was led up the steps to the execution site and asked to be unbound. He forgave his executioners and this caused them distress and refused to be blindfolded since he wanted to die looking at the town that he loved and served. He drew closer to them to embrace them but one of the three refused to be embraced and he alone shot the priest dead. That man later said: "If I had touched him, I wouldn't have been able to shoot". He was shot dead among the graves in outer Mataró. Following his death an announcement from town hall stated that "justice has been done". This proclamation led to great concerns among the people who had loved Samsó. There were two males in the area who witnessed the killing and had jumped a wall seeing what had unfolded. One of them died themselves during the war and the other lived on to provide information on the murder during the beatification process.

The Bishop of Segovia Daniel Llorente hailed him for his efforts in catechesis and referred to his initiatives as "the best-organized catechism in the whole of Spain". The Bishop of Barcelona Manuel Irurita had expressed several times that Samsó was "the first catechist of the diocese". His remains were later exhumed and reinterred in his parish church on 23 October 1944.

== Beatification ==
The diocesan process for the investigation for the possible beatification cause was launched on 12 February 1959 under the direction of Archbishop Gregorio Modrego Casaus. But Pope Paul VI in 1964 suspended all causes related to those who were killed during the Spanish Civil War on the basis that further investigation was needed in order to determine if those proposed for canonization were killed "in odium fidei" (in hatred of the faith) and not for political purposes. These causes - which included that of Samsó - remained inactive until the pontificate of Pope John Paul II who decided enough time had passed and reactivated the causes. The Congregation for the Causes of Saints issued the "nihil obstat" (no objections) decree to jumpstart the cause on 27 January 1996 and the diocesan process resumed on 13 March 1996 under Cardinal Ricardo María Carles Gordó and closed later on 18 March 1999. The C.C.S. validated this process on 23 June 2000 as having adhered to the norms regulating causes of sainthood.

The postulation submitted the Positio dossier to the C.C.S. in 2004 for assessment and was a document that detailed his life and works as well as the circumstances surrounding his death. Theologians approved the cause on 4 April 2009 as did the C.C.S. cardinal and bishop members two months later on 16 June. Pope Benedict XVI confirmed in a decree issued on 3 July that Samsó would be beatified and Archbishop Angelo Amato presided over the beatification on the pope's behalf on 23 January 2010. The bishops from the Barcelona region issued a statement just before the beatification and pointed to him as a model of forgiveness while calling for priests to emulate him as "promoters of that spirit of forgiveness and reconciliation". There were 400 priests in attendance including the Cardinal Archbishop of Barcelona Lluís Martínez Sistach including his predecessor Cardinal Carles as well as other individuals such as José Montilla and Jordi Pujol. The beatification was the first in Catalonia.

The current postulator for this cause is the Piarist priest Ramon Julià Saurí.
