= Mohd Najmuddin Elias =

Malaysian politician

Yang Berhormat Captain (Rtd) Dato' Mohd Najmuddin Elias DSPN MLA

Member of the Perak State Legislative Assembly for Batu Kurau
- Incumbent
- Assumed office 19 December 2022
- Preceded by: Muhammad Amin Zakaria (BN–UMNO)
- Majority: 3,218 (2022)
- In office 21 March 2004 – 5 May 2013
- Preceded by: Mohd Jafri Mohd Yunus (BN–UMNO)
- Succeeded by: Muhammad Amin Zakaria (BN–UMNO)
- Majority: 3,927 (2004); 2,439 (2008)

Personal details
- Born: Mohd Najmuddin bin Elias; 6 June 1964 (age 61) Batu Kurau, Perak, Federation of Malaya
- Party: United Malays National Organisation (UMNO) (–2020); Malaysian United Indigenous Party (BERSATU) (2020–present)
- Other political affiliations: Barisan Nasional (BN) (–2020); Perikatan Nasional (PN) (2020–present)
- Relatives: Ahmad Hasbullah Alias (brother); Mohammad Kazim Elias (brother)
- Occupation: Politician, military officer

Mohd Najmuddin bin Elias (born 6 June 1964) is a Malaysian politician who served as Member of the Perak State Legislative Assembly (MLA) for Batu Kurau from March 2004 to March 2008 and again since November 2022. He is a member of Malaysian United Indigenous Party (BERSATU), a component party of Perikatan Nasional (PN) and was a member of United Malays National Organisation (UMNO), a component of Barisan Nasional (BN).

== Political career ==
Mohd Najmuddin Elias elected as Batu Kurau assemblyman from March 2004 to March 2013.

In the 2022 Perak state election, he made a comeback as a candidate from BERSATU contesting on the Perikatan Nasional ticket in the same seat.

== Election results ==
Perak State Legislative Assembly
| Year | Constituency | Candidate | Votes | Pct | Opponent(s) | Votes | Pct | Ballots cast | Majority | Turnout |
|---|---|---|---|---|---|---|---|---|---|---|
| 2004 | N07 Batu Kurau | Mohd Najmuddin Elias (UMNO) | 7,629 | 65.38% | Mohamed Adly Kamarun (PKR) | 3,702 | 34.62% | 11,668 | 3,927 | 76.19% |
| 2008 | N07 Batu Kurau | Mohd Najmuddin Elias (UMNO) | 7,023 | 60.50% | Abdul Hamid Ali (PKR) | 4,584 | 39.50% | 11,902 | 2,439 | 77.12% |
| 2022 | N07 Batu Kurau | Mohd Najmuddin Elias (BERSATU) | 8,806 | 50.67% | Saliza Ahmad (UMNO) | 5,588 | 32.15% | 17,998 | 3,218 | 80.32% |
| 2022 | N07 Batu Kurau | Mohd Najmuddin Elias (BERSATU) | 8,806 | 50.67% | Muhamad Aiman Aizuddin (PKR) | 2,669 | 15.36% | 17,998 | 3,218 | 80.32% |
| 2022 | N07 Batu Kurau | Mohd Najmuddin Elias (BERSATU) | 8,806 | 50.67% | Zulkifli Yahya (PEJUANG) | 317 | 1.82% | 17,998 | 3,218 | 80.32% |

== Honours ==
- Penang
  - Officer of the Order of the Defender of State (DSPN) – Dato' (2007)
