= Haziq Zikri Elias =

Malaysian footballer

Haziq Zikri
Personal information
- Full name: Haziq Zikri bin Elias
- Date of birth: 5 April 1991 (age 35)
- Place of birth: Kuala Lumpur, Malaysia
- Height: 1.79 m (5 ft 10 1/2 in)
- Position: Striker

Senior career*
Years	Team	Apps	(Gls)
2009	Harimau Muda		
2010	Harimau Muda B		
2011	Harimau Muda A		
July 2011 – Oct 2011	→ Selangor FA (loan)		
- * Club domestic league appearances and goals as of 21 May 2009 ‡ National team caps and goals as of 22 May 2009

Haziq Zikri (born 5 April 1991 in Kuala Lumpur) is a Malaysian footballer.

He recently played for Harimau Muda A in the Malaysia Super League.

== Career ==
Haziq is Malaysian-born but raised in the United Kingdom. He was noticed by the Football Association of Malaysia in November 2008, and recruited to join the Football Association of Malaysia. The association gave Haziq a contract to play for the newly created, Harimau Muda that was set to join the 2009 Premier League season.

Haziq was officially part of the Harimau Muda squad in 2009. Haziq later joined the Malaysia national under-19 team for the 2010 AFC U-19 Championship qualification. Harimau Muda later won the 2009 Premier League Malaysia.

After Harimau Muda was split into two teams and Haziq was chosen to play for the Harimau Muda A team. He left Harimau Muda A in July 2011 to join the former champions, Selangor FA alongside 3 others Harimau Muda players. Haziq will join Selangor on a loan for the Malaysia Cup.

Currently he is in United Kingdom to further his studies at the Hartpury College.
