= Federal court =

Federal court may refer to:

== United States ==
- Federal judiciary of the United States
  - United States district court, a particular federal court

== Elsewhere ==
- Federal Court of Australia
- Federal courts of Brazil
- Federal Court (Canada)
- Federal courts (Germany)
- Federal Court of India, existed from 1937 to 1950
- Federal Court of Justice, Germany
- Federal Court of Malaysia
- Federal courts of Switzerland

== See also ==
- Federal Supreme Court (disambiguation)
- Federalism (disambiguation)
