= Greyce Elias =

Brazilian politician (born 1981)

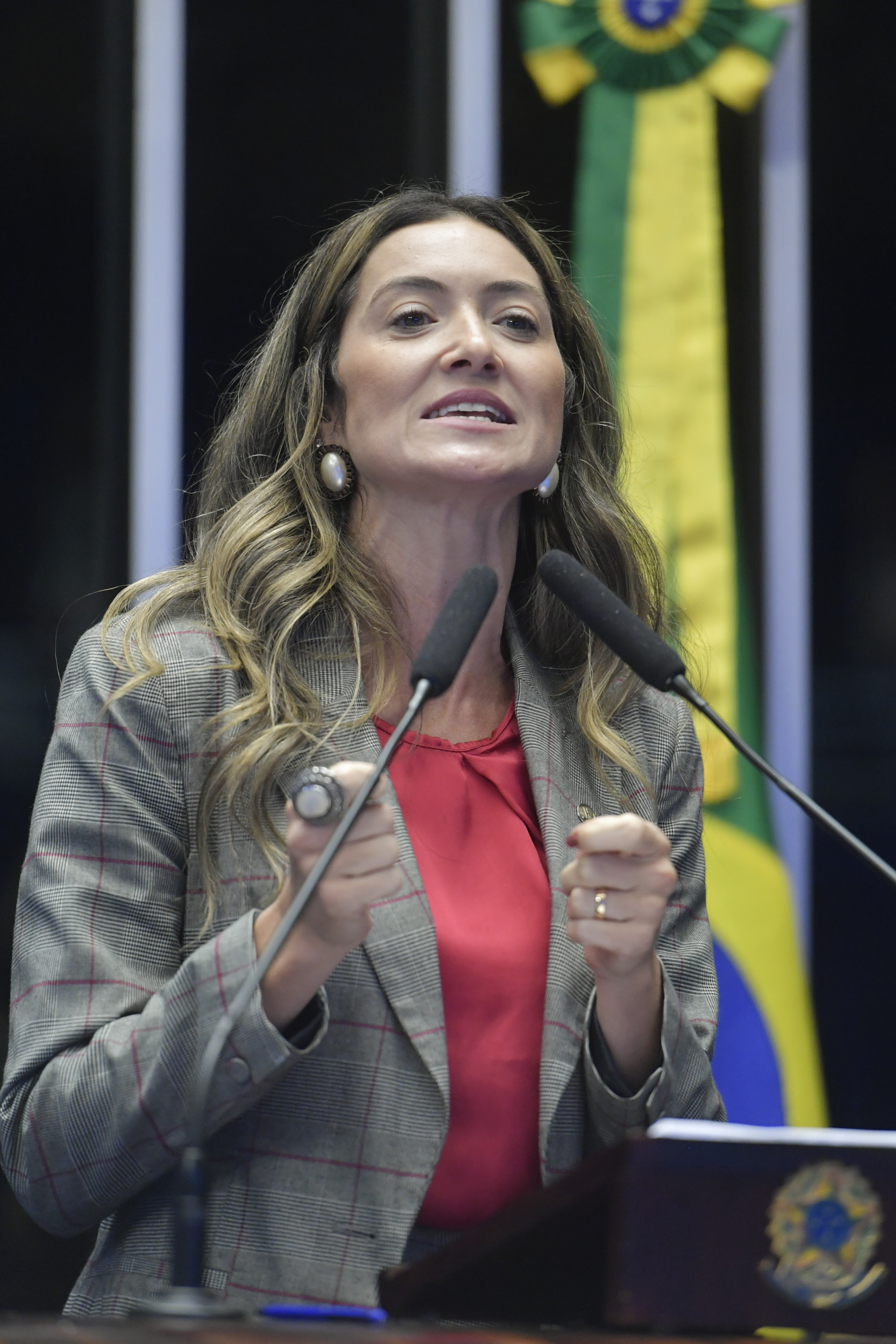
- Elias in 2024

Member of the Chamber of Deputies
- Incumbent
- Assumed office 1 February 2019
- Constituency: Minas Gerais

Personal details
- Born: 15 December 1981 (age 44)
- Party: PL (since 2026)
- Other political affiliations: Avante (2018-2026)

Greyce de Queiroz Elias (born 15 December 1981) is a Brazilian politician serving as a member of the Chamber of Deputies since 2019. From 2013 to 2016, she was a city councillor of Patrocínio.
