= Isaac Elias =

Dutch Golden Age painter

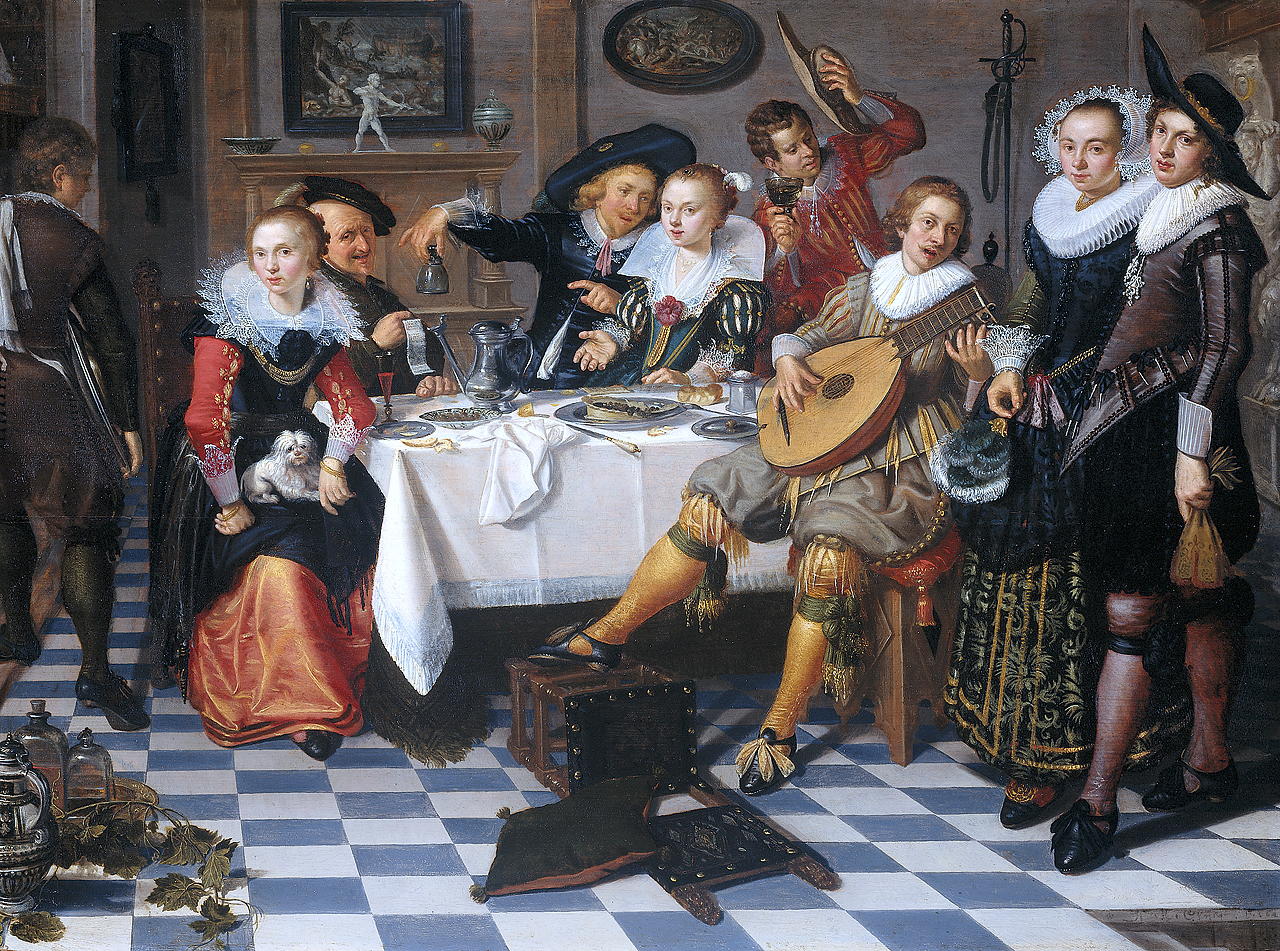
A party in 1629, collection Rijksmuseum

Isaac Elias (1590 – 1630), was a Dutch Golden Age painter.

== Biography ==
He was probably born in Amsterdam and is known for portraits and genre works.
