= Jennie Elias =

British politician

Jennie Elias with Baroness Thatcher and Christopher Chope MP

Jennie Elias is a politician in the United Kingdom. Having been appointed by David Cameron in December 2005 she currently serves as one of the treasurers of the Conservative Party. Previously she served as vice-chairman of the party during the period of Michael Howard's leadership (2003 to 2005). Prior to this Jennie Elias has had various other political roles including being a London area officer, vice-chairman of Kensington and Chelsea Conservative Association and serving several times on the London mayoral selection committee. She remains a member of the executive committee of the Thatcherite pressure group Conservative Way Forward and is president of the Ronald Reagan Memorial Fund Trust.

Outside politics Jennie Elias is also a well-known interior designer authoring the Percy Bass Book of Traditional Decoration (ISBN 1859385389) and co-authoring the Decorator's Guide to Fabrics, Wallpapers, Rugs and Trimmings (ISBN 0955200709). She also serves on the governing body of Sussex House School.
