= Eduardo Arellano Elías =

Mexican poet

Eduardo Arellano Elías (1959 in Zacatecas – 2004 in Mexicali) was a Mexican poet.

== Personal life ==
Elías graduated from Universidad Autónoma de Nuevo León, and has lived in Baja California since 1988. He was a father of two; his eldest is named Rodrigo Arellano Sada, and youngest is Lorena Arellano Sada.

== Writing ==
As a translator, Elías published "La revolución del desierto" by Lowel L. Blaisdell (1990). As an author, he published "Diáspora o pasión" (1984), "Desierto de la palabra" (1994), "La tierra destinada" (1999), and "Esas plazas insomnes" (2003).

== Other works ==
In 2000, he was part of the Instituto Municipal de Arte y Cultura de Tijuana' council, and for several years was a lecturer at Universidad Autónoma de Baja California.
