= Qloo =

Artificial intelligence software company

- Company type: Private
- Founded: 2012; 14 years ago
- Headquarters: New York City
- Founders: Alex Elias; Jay Alger
- Industry: Internet; Artificial intelligence
- Website: qloo.com

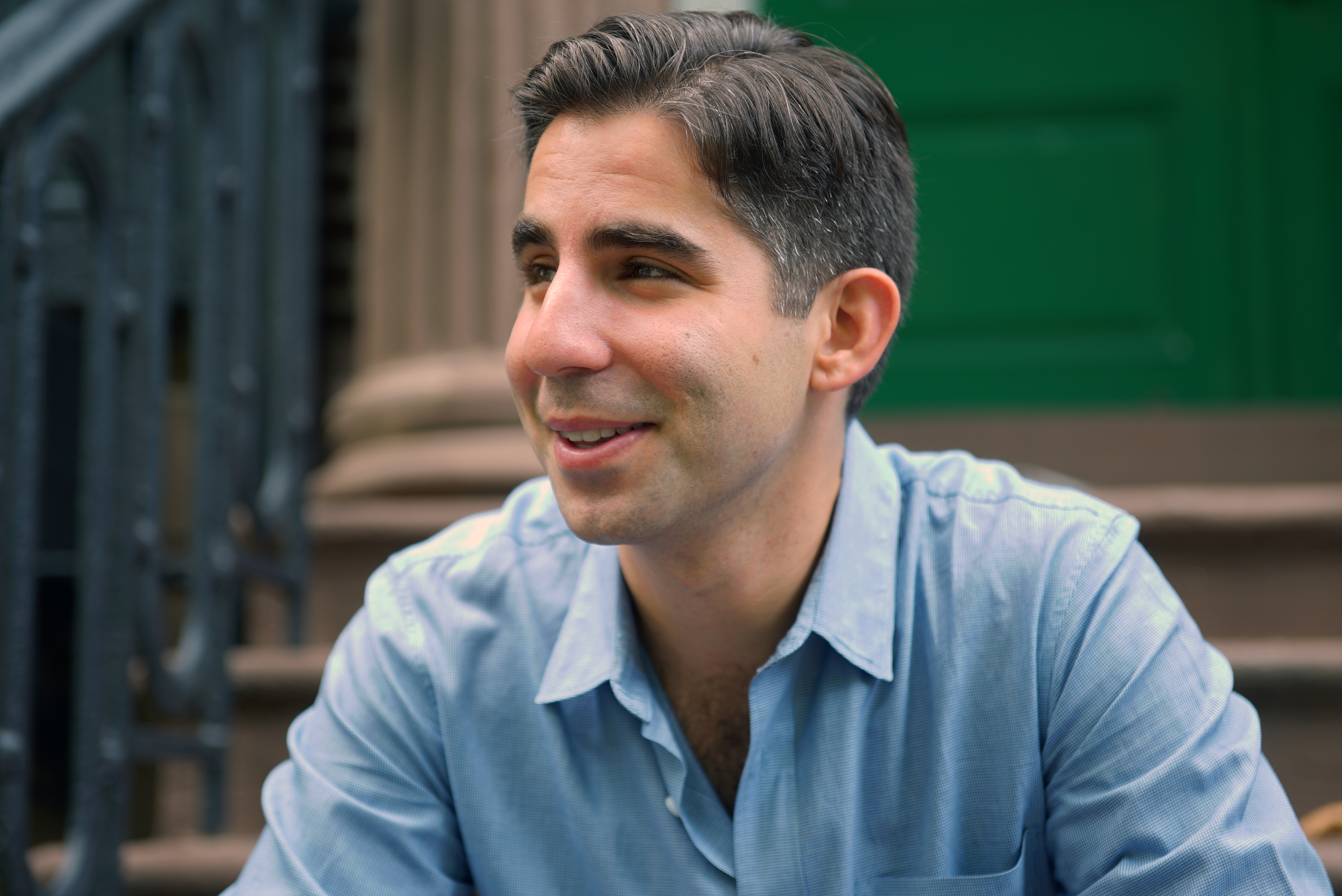
Alex Elias

Qloo (pronounced "clue") is a company that uses artificial intelligence (AI) to understand taste and cultural correlations. It provides companies with an application programming interface (API). It received funding from Leonardo DiCaprio, Elton John, Barry Sternlicht, Pierre Lagrange and others.

Qloo establishes consumer preference correlations via machine learning across data spanning cultural domains including music, film, television, dining, nightlife, fashion, books, and travel. The recommender system uses AI to predict correlations for further applications.

== History ==
Qloo was founded in 2012 by chief executive officer Alex Elias and chief operating officer Jay Alger. Qloo initially launched an app designed for consumers, allowing them to understand their own tastes and receive personalized recommendations. The company amassed several million users and built a large catalog of cultural entities and corresponding user sentiment. In 2012, Qloo raised $1.4 million in seed funding from investors including Cedric the Entertainer, and venture capital firm Kindler Capital. Qloo had a public beta release in November 2012 after its initial funding.

In 2013, the company raised an additional $1.6 million from Cross Creek Pictures founding partner Tommy Thompson, and Samih Toukan and Hussam Khoury, founders of Maktoob, an Internet services company purchased by Yahoo! for $164 million in 2009. On November 14, 2013, a website and an iPhone app were announced. The company later released an Android app, and tablet versions, in mid-2014.

In 2015, Twitter approached Qloo about powering personalized social feeds and targeted eCommerce ads on the platform based on what users were posting. Qloo developed an enterprise-grade API to support Twitter’s needs. Twitter ended up pivoting to enable brands to use the social platform for customer service and support, but Qloo was able to sell access to its cultural intelligence via API to many other enterprise clients, marking the official transition from a B2C company to a B2B company.

In 2016, Qloo secured $4.5 million in venture capital investment. The $4.5 million was split between a number of investors, including Barry Sternlicht, Pierre Lagrange, and Leonardo DiCaprio. In July 2017, Qloo raised $6.5 million in funding rounds from AXA Strategic Ventures, and Elton John.

Following the investment, the founders stated in an interview with Tech Crunch that they would use the investment to expand Qloo's database. They hoped the move would secure larger contracts with corporate clients. At the time, clients already included Fortune 500 companies such as Twitter, PepsiCo, and BMW.

In 2019, the company announced that it had acquired cultural recommendation service TasteDive, with Alex Elias becoming chairman of TasteDive. In September 2019, Qloo was named among the Top 14 Artificial Intelligence APIs by ProgrammableWeb.

In 2022, Qloo raised $15M in Series B funding from Eldridge and AXA Venture Partners, enabling the privacy-centric AI leader to expand its team of world-class data scientists, enrich its technology, and build on its sales channels in order to continue to offer premier insights into global consumer taste for Fortune 500 companies across the globe. Qloo was recognized as the "Best Decision Intelligence Company" at the 2023 AI Breakthrough Awards. Also in 2023, the company was awarded a Top Performer Award by SourceForge. As of 2024, Qloo is a three-time Inc. 5000 honoree: No. 360 (2022), No. 344 (2021), No. 187 (2020).

Qloo raised $25 million Series C round on February 21, 2024. The round was led by AI Ventures with participation from AXA Venture Partners, Eldridge, and Moderne Ventures, allowing Qloo to address new commercial surface areas for Taste AI, including on-device learning and foundational models leveraging Qloo, as well as introduce self-service platform to make consumer and taste analytics available to small and mid-sized enterprises and individuals. Qloo also announced pursuing opportunistic M&A using its balance sheet along the lines of the TasteDive acquisition completed, which expanded Qloo's first-party data moat and corpus of cultural learning. This latest financing brought the total amount raised since the company's founding in 2012 to over $56 million.

== Services and features ==
Qloo calls itself a cultural AI platform to provide real-time correlation data across domains of culture and entertainment including: film, music, television, dining, nightlife, fashion, books, and travel. Each category contains subcategories.

Qloo’s knowledge of a user's taste in one category can be utilized to offer suggestions in other categories. Users then rate the suggestions, providing it with feedback for future suggestions. Qloo has partnerships with companies such as Expedia and iTunes.

== Technology ==
Qloo’s Taste AI technology uses machine learning to decode and predict consumers’ interests, maintaining user anonymity. It is powered by 3.7 billion lifestyle entities (brands, music, film, TV, dining, nightlife, fashion, books, travel, and more) and trillions of anonymized consumer behavioral signals. Through AI, Qloo identifies patterns in these data signals, making predictions about how much interest a person or group has in a concept or thing.

Central to Qloo’s technology are algorithms designed to detect and mitigate biases within datasets and models, allowing Qloo to assess the fairness of its AI systems with a focus on attributes such as age, gender, and race, enabling the company to fine-tune its AI models to align with their ethical standards. They also use visualization tools to probe the behavior of their AI models for conducting counterfactual analyses and for comparing the performances of the AI models across diverse demographic segments.

Qloo’s Taste AI doesn’t collect or use any Personally Identifiable Information (PII). Instead, it derives recommendations for audience segments based on co-occurrences between lifestyle entities and anonymized behavioral signals.

== Applications ==
- Starbucks uses Qloo to create in-store music playlists tailored to specific neighborhoods.
- Hershey’s uses Qloo to customize the content of assorted candy bags.
- Michelin uses Qloo to serve recommendations in its Michelin Guide app.
- Netflix leverages Qloo’s technology to enhance merchandising by identifying actors who resonate with certain demographics.

Qloo also works with PepsiCo, Samsung, The New York Mets, BuzzFeed, and Ticketmaster, Universal Music Group, and OOH advertising company JCDecaux.
