= Ilyas Ahmed =

Ilyas Ahmed may refer:

- Ilyas Ahmed (East Pakistan cricketer), Pakistani cricketer for East Pakistan
- Ilyas Ahmed (Kuwaiti cricketer) (born 1990)
