= Rami Elias =

Syrian priest and psychotherapist

Father Rami Elias
- الأب رامي الياس اليسوعي
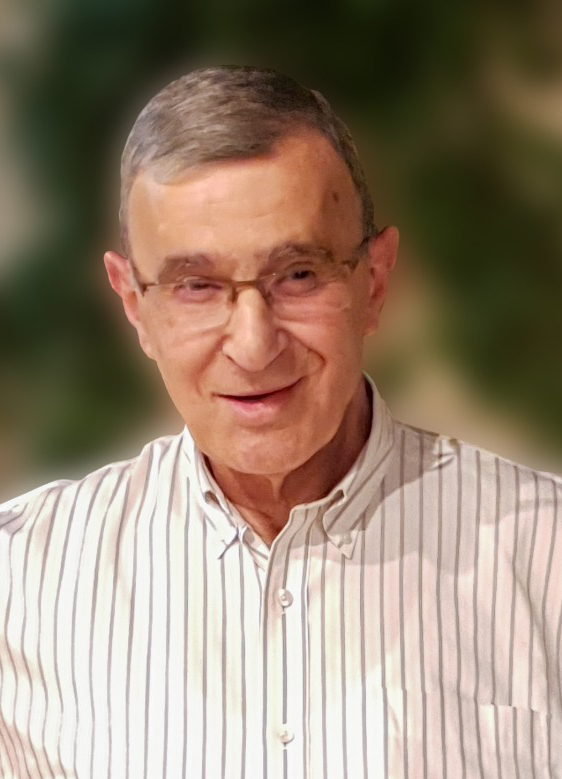
- Born: 1953 (age 72–73); Latakia, Syria
- Education: Master of Philosophy, Theology and Psychoanalysis from Centre Sèvres
- Occupations: Priest & Psychotherapist
- Organization: Jesuit Order
- Television: Live with Father Rami Elias
- Website: AlKalimeh

Father Rami Elias (Arabic: رامي الياس) (born 1953) is a Syrian Jesuit priest specialized in psychoanalysis.

== Biography ==
Father Rami Elias taught philosophy, theology and psychoanalysis for ten years at Centre Sèvres in Paris, France. He has been practicing psychotherapy in Syria since 1985. He was appointed in charge of Jesuit scholars in the Middle East region, and teaches and lectures priests and nuns in Syria and Lebanon. Elias is also responsible for the Catholic Christian Education Committee, and supervises the Catholic Church educational centres in Greater Damascus. He participated in the founding of the Christian Theological Institute for Laity in Syria and launched with some lay people the Joint Qualification project providing proper preparation to Church leaders in Damascus. He also contributed to the development of the official Christian education curriculum in Syria. In addition, he supervised the preparation of the Syrian Christian Youth encounter with Pope John Paul II during his visit to Syria in May 2001.

Being a psychotherapist, Father Rami Elias participated in the organization of weekly psychodrama sessions in Damascus at the start of the Syrian crisis in 2011 which aimed to create an open space for people from different tendencies and faiths to meet and express their fear. However, these sessions were terminated after the arrest of one of the organizers, which resulted in people being afraid and refraining from participating.

Father Rami Elias is a member of the Catholic Synod in Syria founded by both the clergy and lay people, working towards reconsidering the Church doctrine and its religious discourse, in coordination with the Episcopal Council and the Eastern Catholic Synod in Rome.

He founded the Watad association in Syria providing educational scholarships to students, psychological support to older people living alone, and vocational training courses for youth from all denominations looking for work opportunities.

== Publications ==
Title	Cover
Book: Who is God? Original Title: من هو الله؟ Language: Arabic Publisher: Dar Al-Mashreq دار المشرق 2006 ISBN 978-2-7214-5205-4	Who is God?
Book: Go to the land I am showing you Original Title: انطلق نحو الأرض التي أريك Language: Arabic Publisher: Petites Soeurs de Jésus أخوات يسوع الصغيرات 2004	Go to the land I am showing you
Book co-authored with Nader Michel : Dad gave me everything – Reflections on fathers and children Original Title: أبي أعطاني كل شيء - تأمل في الأبوة والبنوة Language: Arabic Publisher: Dar Al-Mashreq دار المشرق 2012 ISBN 978-2-7214-5419-5	Dad gave me everything
Book co-authored with several writers: Cloning - between Science, Philosophy and Religion Original Title: الاستنساخ بين العلم والفلسفة والدين Language: Arabic Publisher: مركز العلم والسلام للدراسات والنشر 1997	
