= Manuel Jesús Acosta Elías =

Spanish educator and politician

Member of the Parliament of Catalonia
- Incumbent
- Assumed office 14 February 2021

Personal details
- Born: Manuel Jesús Acosta Elías; 1970 (age 55–56) Barcelona, Spain
- Party: Vox
- Education: University of Barcelona; National University of Distance Education; Autonomous University of Barcelona

Manuel Jesús Acosta Elías (born 1970) is a Spanish educator and politician from Catalonia who is currently a member of the Parliament of Catalonia for the Vox party.

Acosta is a native of Barcelona and comes from a Catalan family. He studied for a degree in geography and history at the University of Barcelona followed by a Master's degree in Hispanic literature from the National University of Distance Education and a PhD and certificate of higher level of Catalan language at the Autonomous University of Barcelona. After graduating, he worked as a high school teacher. He first joined Vox in 2014 and was a spokesman, organiser and councilor for the party in Sentmenat.

During the 2021 Catalan regional election he was one of eleven Vox deputies election to the Parliament of Catalonia in which he was elected to serve the Barcelona constituency. Acosta is opposed to Catalan independence.
