= Imanol Elías =

Spanish footballer

Personal information
- Full name: Imanol Elías Ayllón
- Date of birth: 17 August 1990 (age 36)
- Place of birth: Pamplona, Spain
- Height: 1.85 m (6 ft 1 in)
- Position: Goalkeeper

Team information
- Current team: Barco

Youth career
- Osasuna

Senior career*
Years	Team	Apps	(Gls)
2009–2013	Osasuna B	61	(0)
2013–2014	Zamora	33	(0)
2014–2016	Mirandés	10	(0)
2016–2017	Lorca Deportiva	14	(0)
2017–2018	Barco	27	(0)
2018	Peña Deportiva	19	(0)
2018–2019	Langreo	18	(0)
2019–2020	Haro Deportivo	3	(0)
2020–2021	Poblense	26	(0)
2022–2023	Mutilvera	19	(0)
2024–	Barco	50	(0)
- * Club domestic league appearances and goals as of 9 November 2025

Imanol Elías Ayllón (born 17 August 1990) is a Spanish footballer who plays as a goalkeeper for Tercera Federación club Barco.

== Football career ==
Born in Pamplona, Navarre, Imanol finished his graduation with CA Osasuna's youth setup, and made his senior debuts with the reserves in the 2009–10 campaign, in Segunda División B. On 5 January 2013 he was named in the substitutes' bench with the main squad for the match against Sevilla FC, but remained unused in the La Liga 0–1 away loss.

In August 2013 Imanol rescinded his link with Osasuna, and moved to Zamora CF also in the third division. After appearing regularly with the latter he joined Segunda División's CD Mirandés on 3 July of the following year.

On 7 September 2014 Imanol appeared in his first game as a professional, starting in a 1–2 home loss against AD Alcorcón.
