= Bertha Elias =

Dutch lawyer and activist

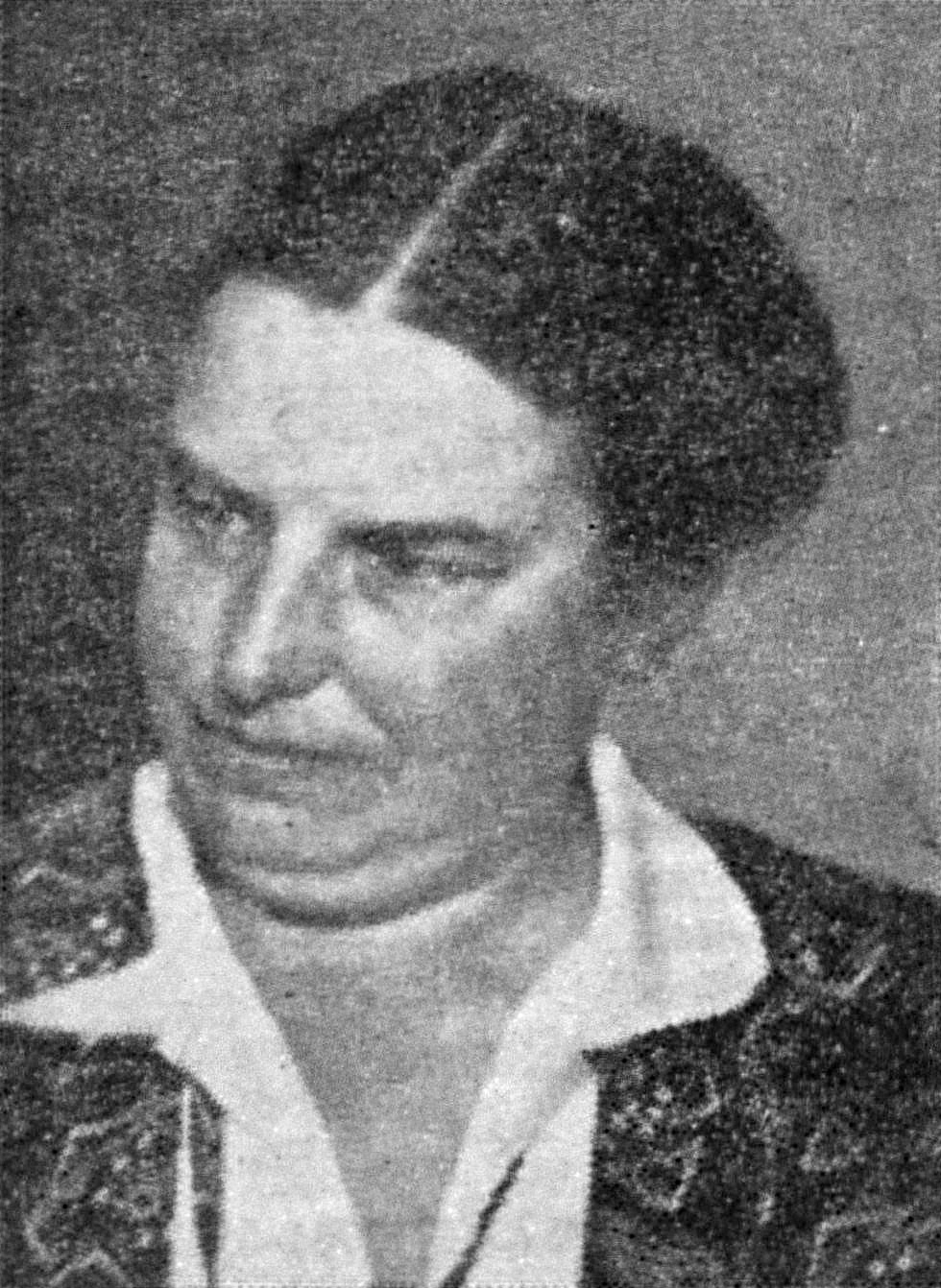
Bertha Elias (1933).

Bertha Elias (1 February 1889 in Utrecht – 18 July 1933 in The Hague) was a Dutch lawyer, women's rights activist and museum director. As a director of the Museum for Education in The Hague, she was the first woman to hold such a position in the Netherlands in 1923. As successor to Herman van Cappelle, the first director of that museum, Elias achieved a considerable growth in the number of visitors, from approximately 2,500 in 1923 to 100,000 per year in 1932, of which three-quarters were schoolchildren.
