= Renán Elías =

Peruvian aviator

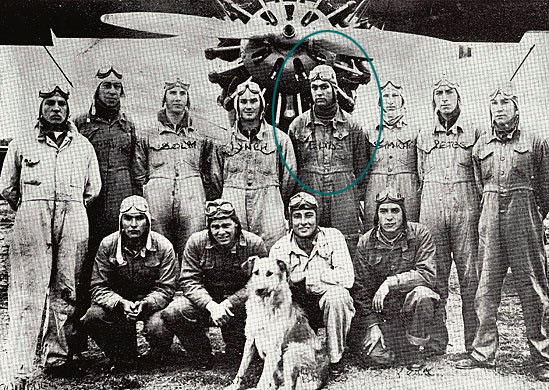
- Elías (highlighted) with his class
- Born: Renán Elías Olivera; February 2, 1915; Ica, Peru
- Died: July 7, 1941 (aged 26) off the coast near Tumbes, Peru
- Education: Saint Aloysius Gonzaga National University
- Military career
- Allegiance: Peru
- Branch: Aeronautical Corps of Peru
- Service years: 1935–1941
- Rank: Captain (posthumous)
- Conflicts: Ecuadorian–Peruvian War

Renán Elías Olivera (February 2, 1915 – July 7, 1941) was a Peruvian aviator who fought during the Ecuadorian–Peruvian War in 1941.

== Early life ==
Elías was born in Ica on February 2, 1915, to parents Óscar Elías Toledo and Leonor Olivera Martínez. Elías was the third of the seven children of Óscar Elías Toledo and Leonor Olivera Martínez, as stated in his birth certificate, since he did not have a baptismal certificate since he was never baptized because his father was an atheist. He studied at the Saint Aloysius Gonzaga National University.

== Military career ==
He joined the Aeronautical Corps of Peru on March 9, 1935, being twenty years old at the time. When the Ecuadorian–Peruvian War broke out in 1941, he was assigned a bombardment mission over Ecuador on July 7. When the squadron was returning from its mission, Elías noticed that a bomb was stuck in his plane, putting himself and his teammates at risk. As a result, he abandoned his group headed towards the ocean, with the bomb exploding only seconds after.

== Legacy ==
Elías is considered a National Hero of Peru, along with José Quiñones, also killed in the 1941 conflict. Capitán FAP Renán Elías Olivera Airport is named after him, as is a school of the Peruvian Air Force in Chiclayo.

== See also ==
- Peruvian Air Force
- Ecuadorian–Peruvian War
