= Julie Elias (author) =

German fashion journalist

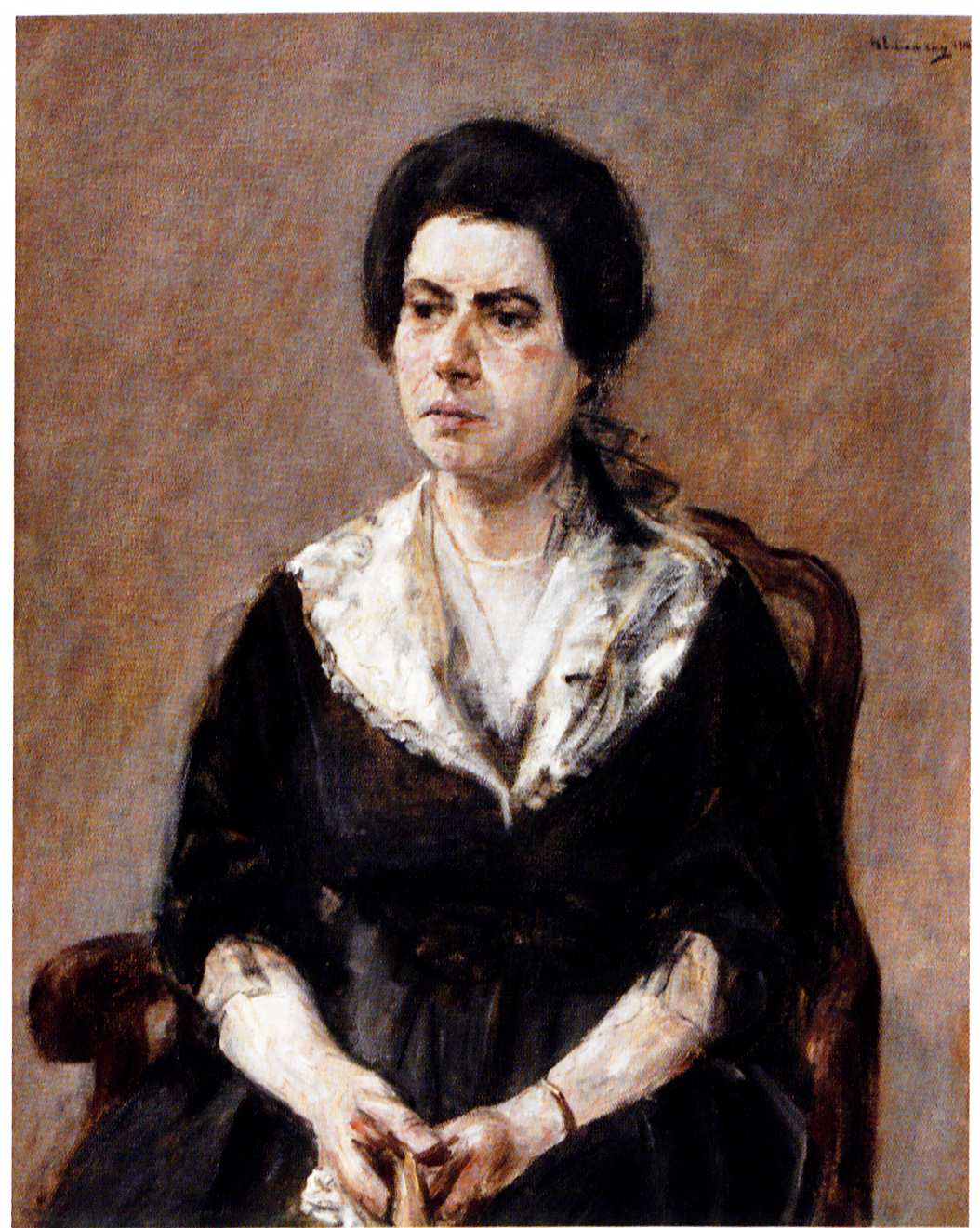
- Max Liebermann: Julie Elias (1914)
- Born: 6 June 1866; Berlin
- Died: 1945 (aged 78–79); Lillehammer, Norway
- Occupation: Writer
- Partner: Julius Elias
- Children: Ludwig Elias
- Writing career
- Notable works: Styl, The Jewish Magazine, Die Dame, The New Cookbook

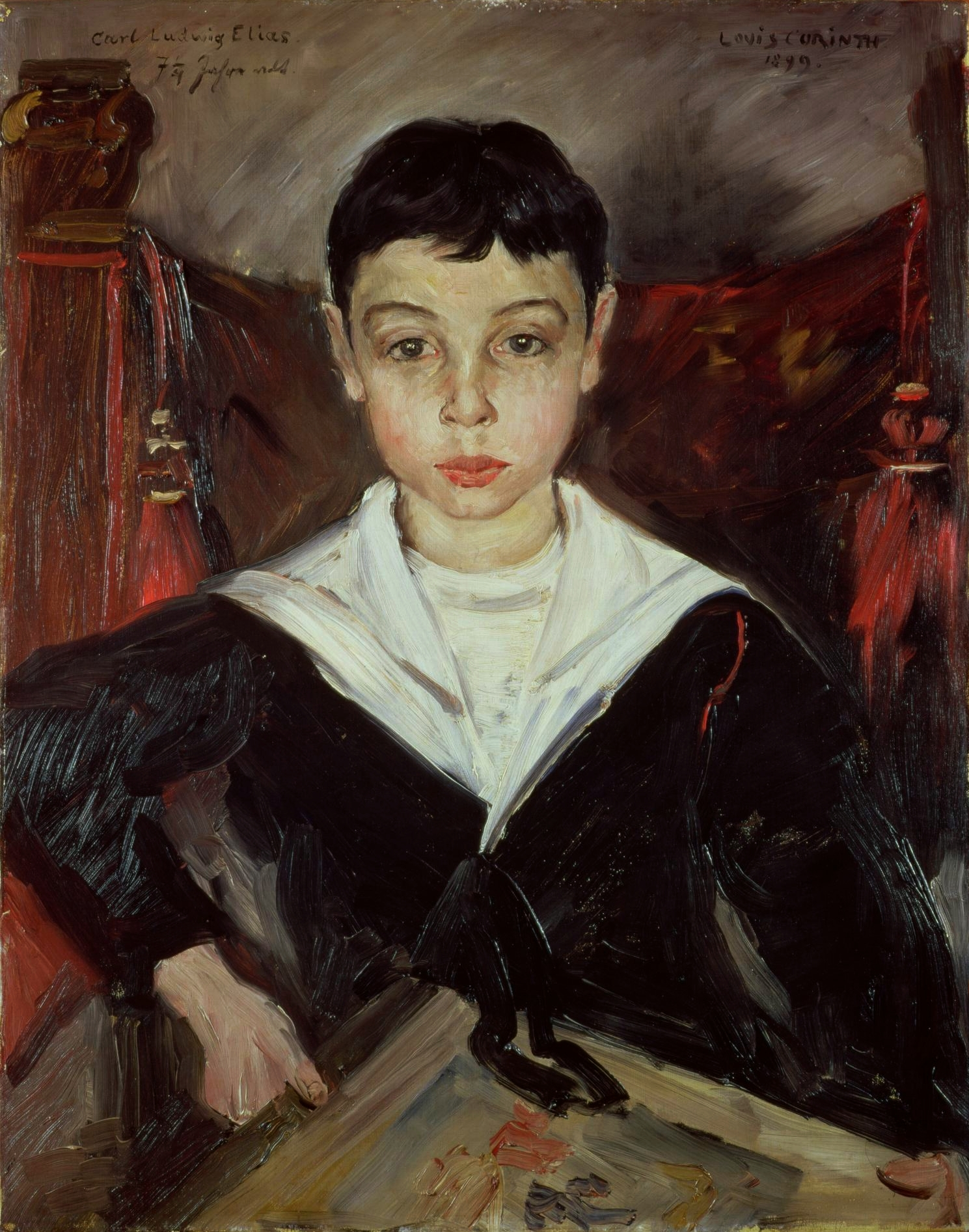
Lovis Corinth: Carl Ludwig Elias (1899)

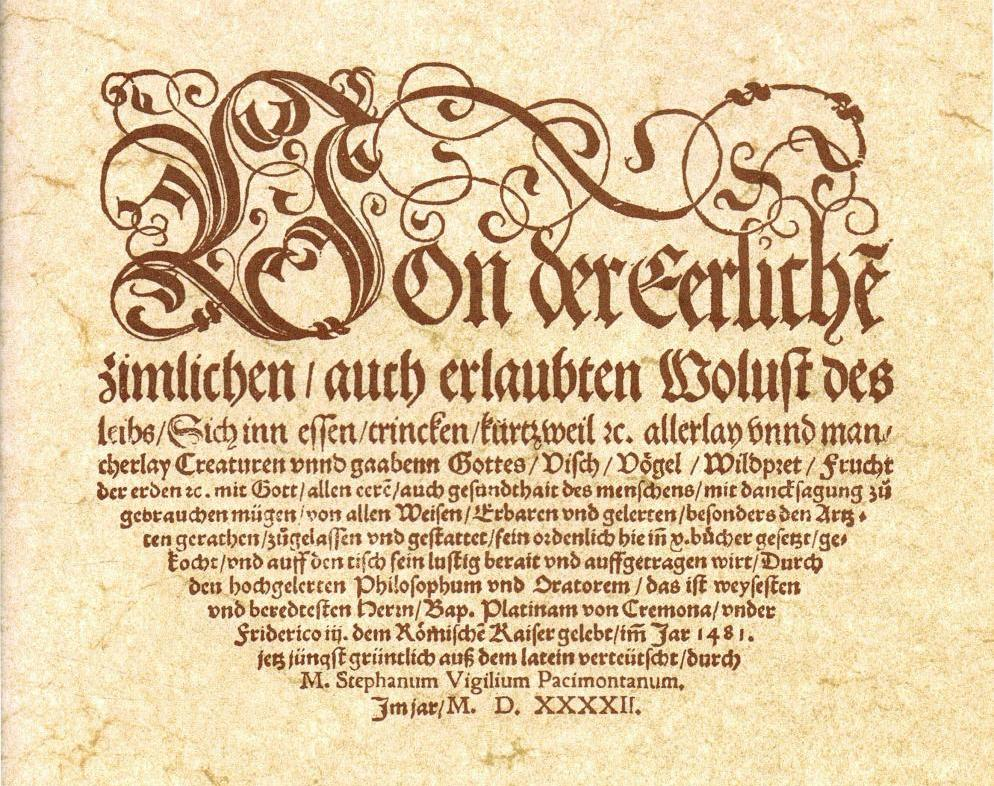
Von der Eerlichē zimlichen / auch erlaubten Wolust des leibs 1542

Julie Elias (born 6 June 1866 in Berlin as Julie Levi; died spring 1945 in Lillehammer in occupied Norway) was a German fashion journalist and author of cookbooks, which also dealt with Jewish cuisine. She was worldly, highly educated, and during her lifetime known beyond the borders of Germany as a culinary salonnière and successful writer. In 1938, persecuted as a Jew, she had to flee Germany. After the destruction of European Jewry in the Holocaust, there were hardly any traces of her left in the public memory.

== Life ==
Julie Levi and the art historian Julius Elias married in 1888; they had a son Ludwig Elias (1891–1942). In 1890 they moved into the inherited house at Matthäikirchstraße 4 in Berlin, had a large circle of friends, cultivated conviviality and were particularly friends with the Liebermann couple, with whom they shared culinary pleasures, especially their love of French cuisine. As a hostess, Julie Elias was praised contemporarily as a "culinary artist.".

== Writer ==
Julie Elias was a fashion journalist as well as the author of books on practical lifestyle and cookbooks. Between 1915 and 1928, 28 articles by her appeared in the Berliner Tageblatt. She also wrote for the Berlin fashion journal Styl, the Jewish Magazine, founded in 1929, and the magazine Die Dame. In her articles, she combined fashion and cooking with Jewish culture, publishing recipes for the Sabbath in Die Dame, for example, or introducing a new fashionable style to conservative Jewish readers in Jüdisches Magazin. She used literary quotations in her texts. In a 1921 article, for example, she conveyed to her readers the connection between the perception of art and the perception of taste by quoting Guy de Maupassant. In another from 1924, she linked Ludwig Börne's letters from Paris with the enthusiasm of German women for Parisian fashion, which was current at the time.

In 1925, she published The New Cookbook, which also dealt with Jewish cuisine. It contained recipes for dishes that are traditionally prepared, especially for Passover, such as matzah. In addition, she described some recipes of prominent Jewish women in Germany at the time, including Martha Liebermann and the fashion journalist Elsa Herzog. Julie Elias' books on cooking and kitchen practice, however, are not just collections of recipes reduced to practical action. Rather, she also included knowledge of cultural history without devaluing craftsmanship. In her books, she thought wittily about culinary arts, quoting from the works of eminent French and German gastrosophists such as Brillat-Savarin and Eugen von Vaerst. She wrote about the art of cooking: "For the rest, cooking is like any other artistic profession: only through practice does one attain proficiency, only through manual activity does one attain mastery. [...] Intelligence alone does not do it - a refined sensuality is necessary.“ In the introduction to the New Cookbook, she prefaced the motto Cooking - "the permitted voluptuousness of life" and in the second edition in 1927 (Cooking) she added the explanation of an old monk's saying.

== Nazi era ==
After the Nazis came to power in Germany in 1933, Elias was persecuted as a Jew. She travelled to Italy in 1934 and Switzerland in 1935. Together with her son Ludwig, who had practiced law in Berlin before 1933, she fled to Norway in 1938 with the support of the Norwegian Foreign Minister Halvdan Koht. While she was able to survive with the help of the Norwegian resistance, her son Ludwig Elias was deported from Oslo to the Auschwitz death camp on 262 November 1942, where he was murdered in the Holocaust.

The Berlin feature writer Heinz Knobloch started a collection of material on Julie Elias, but he did not finish the planned biography.

== Publications (selection) ==
- Die junge Frau. Ein Buch der Lebensführung. Illustrationen Ludwig Kainer. R. Mosse, Berlin 1921
- Brevier der feinen Küche. Illustriert nach den Meistern. Eysler, Berlin 1922
- Taschenbuch für Damen. Zeichnungen und Aquarelle von Emil Orlik. Ullstein A. G., Berlin 1924
- Das neue Kochbuch. Ein Führer durch die feine Küche. Max Liebermann gewidmet. Ullstein, Berlin 1925
  - Kochkunst. Ein Führer durch die feine Küche. Ullstein, Berlin [1927]
- Neue Rezepte. A. Wertheim, Berlin [um 1925]
- Vom Kochen und Würzen. H. W. Appel Feinkost A.G., Hannover 1929
- Sonntags- und Festgerichte. Sunlicht Ges., Mannheim 1931
- Der Besen des Magens. Käse und Käsegerichte. Zeichnungen Heinz Wallenberg. Preuss, Berlin 1931
- ... abends Gäste. Sunlicht Ges., Mannheim 1931
- Paul Reboux: Die neue Lebensart. Großreinemachen mit überlebten Gebräuchen und veralteten Anstandsregeln. Übersetzung Julie Elias. Piper, München 1932

== Literature ==
- Elias, Julie. In: Lexikon deutsch-jüdischer Autoren. Band 6: Dore–Fein. Hrsg. vom Archiv Bibliographia Judaica. Saur, München 1998, ISBN 3-598-22686-1, S. 282–285.
- Ernst Braun: „... meine Frau toastete in wohlgesetzten Worten u gratulirte sich zu ihrem Gatten ...“, in: Claudia Christophersen u. a. (Hrsg.): Romantik und Exil: Festschrift für Konrad Feilchenfeldt. Königshausen & Neumann, Würzburg 2004 ISBN 3-8260-2673-X, S. 364–369
- Ursula Hudson-Wiedenmann: »Meisterwerke für uns’ren Gaumen«. Max Liebermanns Geselligkeit und feine Küche. Mit Rezepten von Julie Elias, Texten und Illustrationen aus dem Liebermann-Kreis und Photographien von Angelika Fischer. Vacat Verlag, Potsdam 2009, ISBN 978-3-930752-46-1 (Rezension)
- Julie Elias (1866-1943) Der Kochkunst ergeben. In: Birgit Jochens: Zwischen Ambition und Rebellion. Karrieren Beriner Kochbuchautorinnen. Verlag für Berlin-Brandenburg, Berlin 2021, ISBN 978-3-947215-88-1, S. 111–123 (mit elf Abbildungen)
