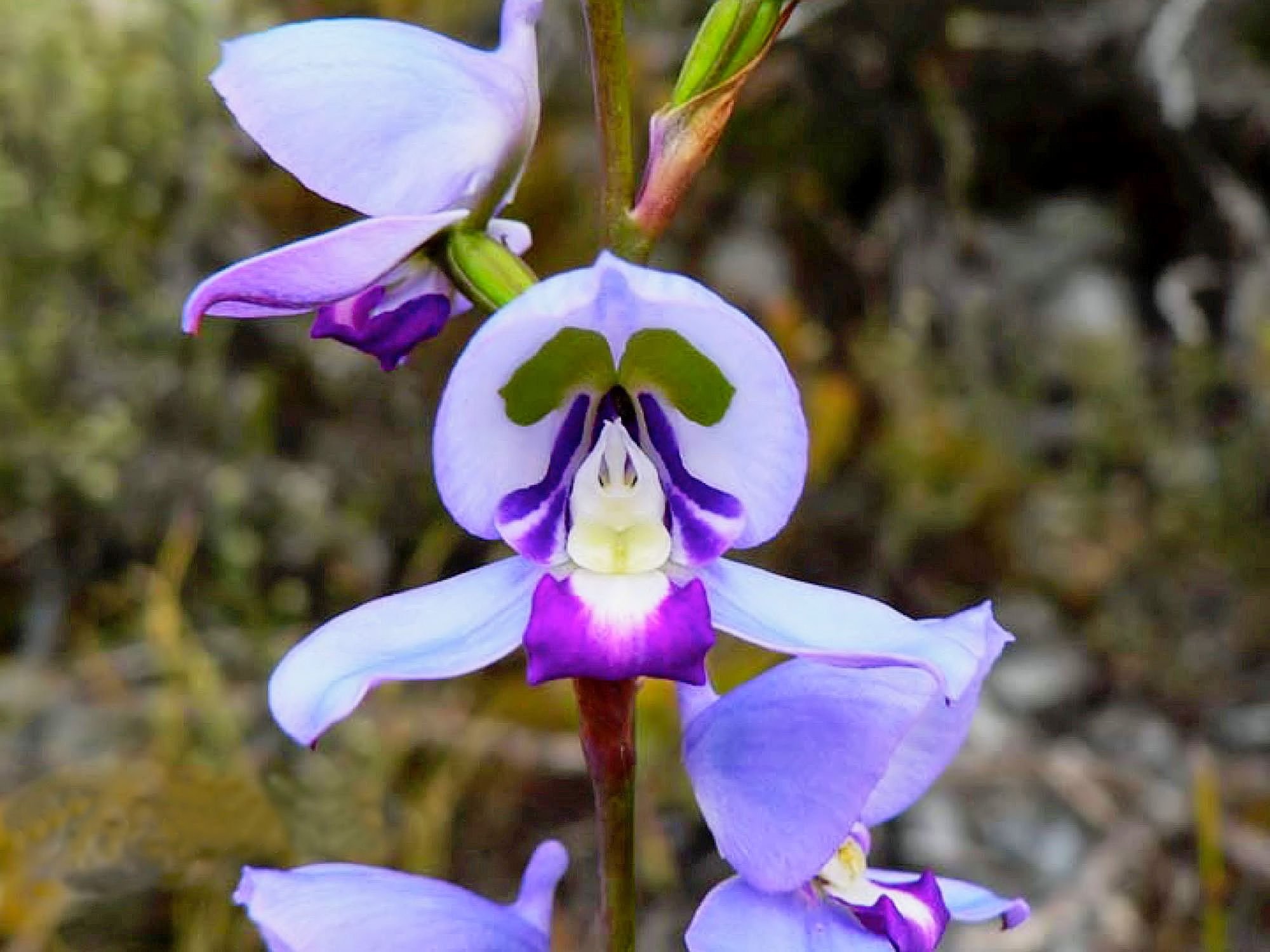
- Disa graminifolia

Scientific classification
- Kingdom: Plantae
- Clade: Tracheophytes
- Clade: Angiosperms
- Clade: Monocots
- Order: Asparagales
- Family: Orchidaceae
- Subfamily: Orchidoideae
- Tribe: Orchideae
- Subtribe: Disinae; Bentham 1881

Genera
- Disa, including: Herschelianthe; Monadenia; Schizodium; Huttonaea; Pachites

= Disinae =

Subtribe of orchids

Disinae is a subtribe of orchids that has been differently defined and placed in the two classification systems that are currently in use for orchids. Genera Orchidacearum, which is currently the definitive work on orchid taxonomy, delimits Disinae as consisting of two closely related genera, Disa and Schizodium, and it places Disinae in the mostly African tribe Diseae, along with four other subtribes: Brownleeinae, Huttonaeinae, Coryciinae, and Satyriinae. In the classification for orchids that was published by Chase et alii in 2015, Schizodium was placed in synonymy under Disa, while Pachites and Huttonaea were transferred to Disinae. In Genera Orchidacearum, Pachites and Satyrium form the subtribe Satyriinae, and Huttonaea is the sole genus in the subtribe Huttonaeinae. The transfer of Pachites and Huttonaea to Disinae by Chase et alii (2015) was done with considerable doubt, and was based upon uncertainty about the relationships of these two genera. In 2009, a molecular phylogenetic study found only weak statistical support for a sister relationship between Huttonaea and Disa.

Disinae was covered, along with the rest of the tribe Diseae, in volume 2 of Genera Orchidacearum, which was published in 2001. Molecular phylogenetic studies published after 1999 showed that Diseae was paraphyletic over another tribe, Orchideae. Consequently, Chase et alii (2015) combined Diseae and Orchideae into a larger version of Orchideae and included Disinae as one of its subtribes.

The subtribe Disinae was erected by George Bentham in 1881, in preparation for the publication of a new classification of orchids in the 1883 edition of Genera Plantarum (Bentham & Hooker). Using the suffixes of that time for taxonomic rank, he called it subtribe "Diseae" of his now obsolete tribe Ophrydeae.

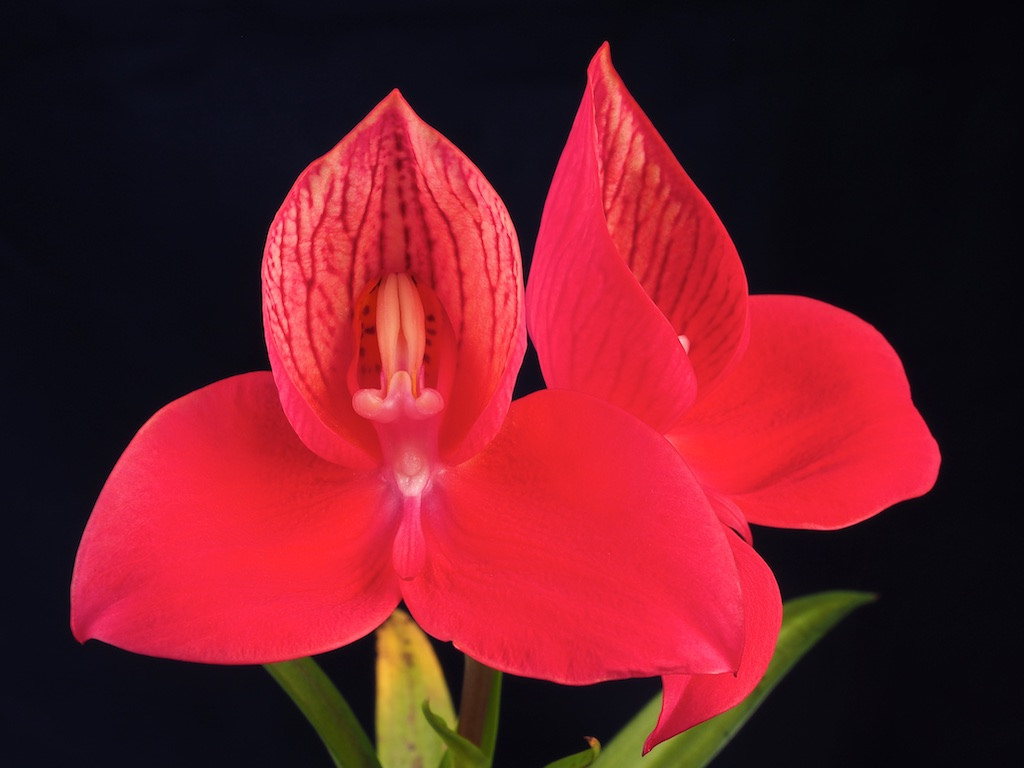
Disa uniflora

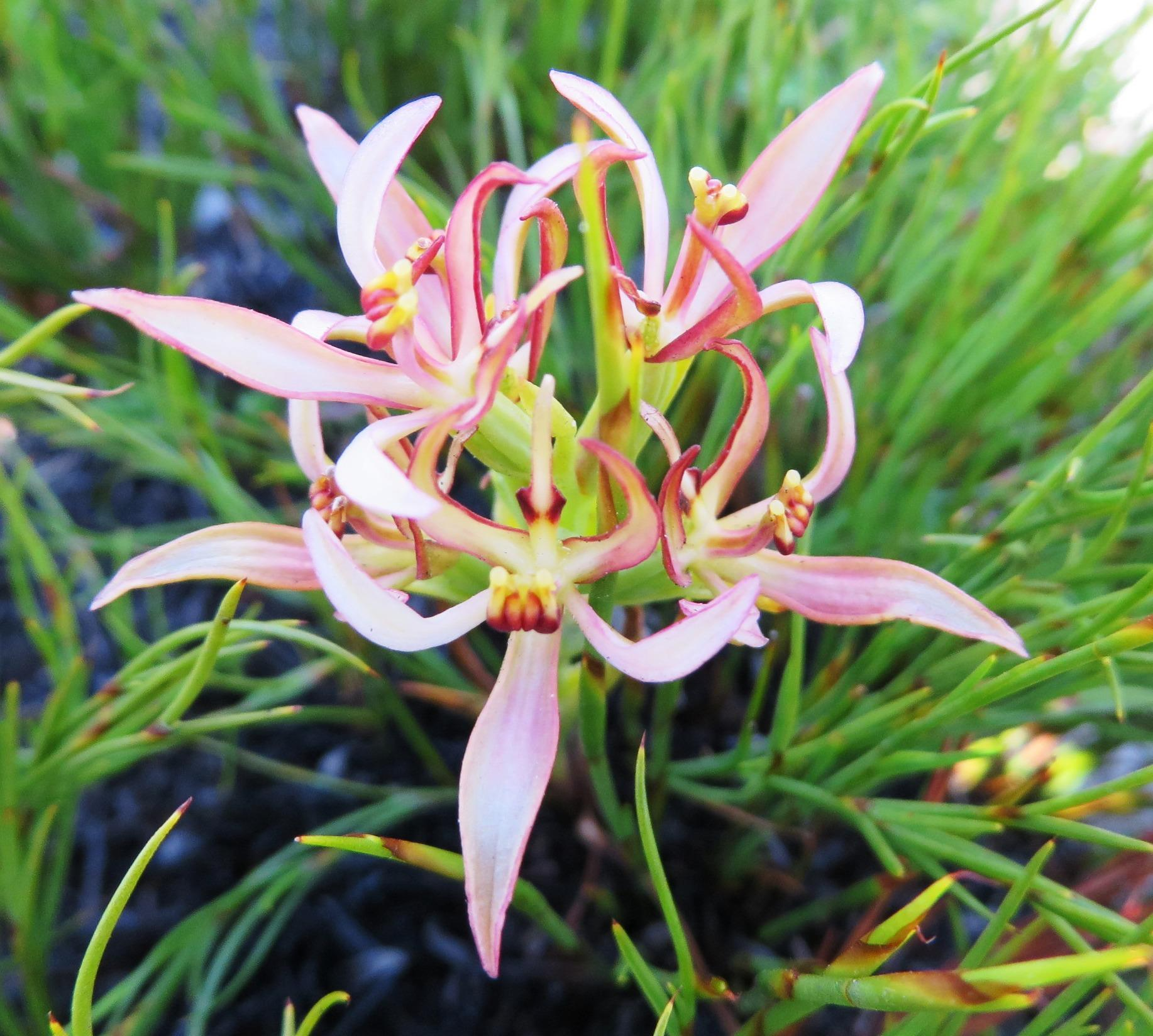
Pachites bodkinii

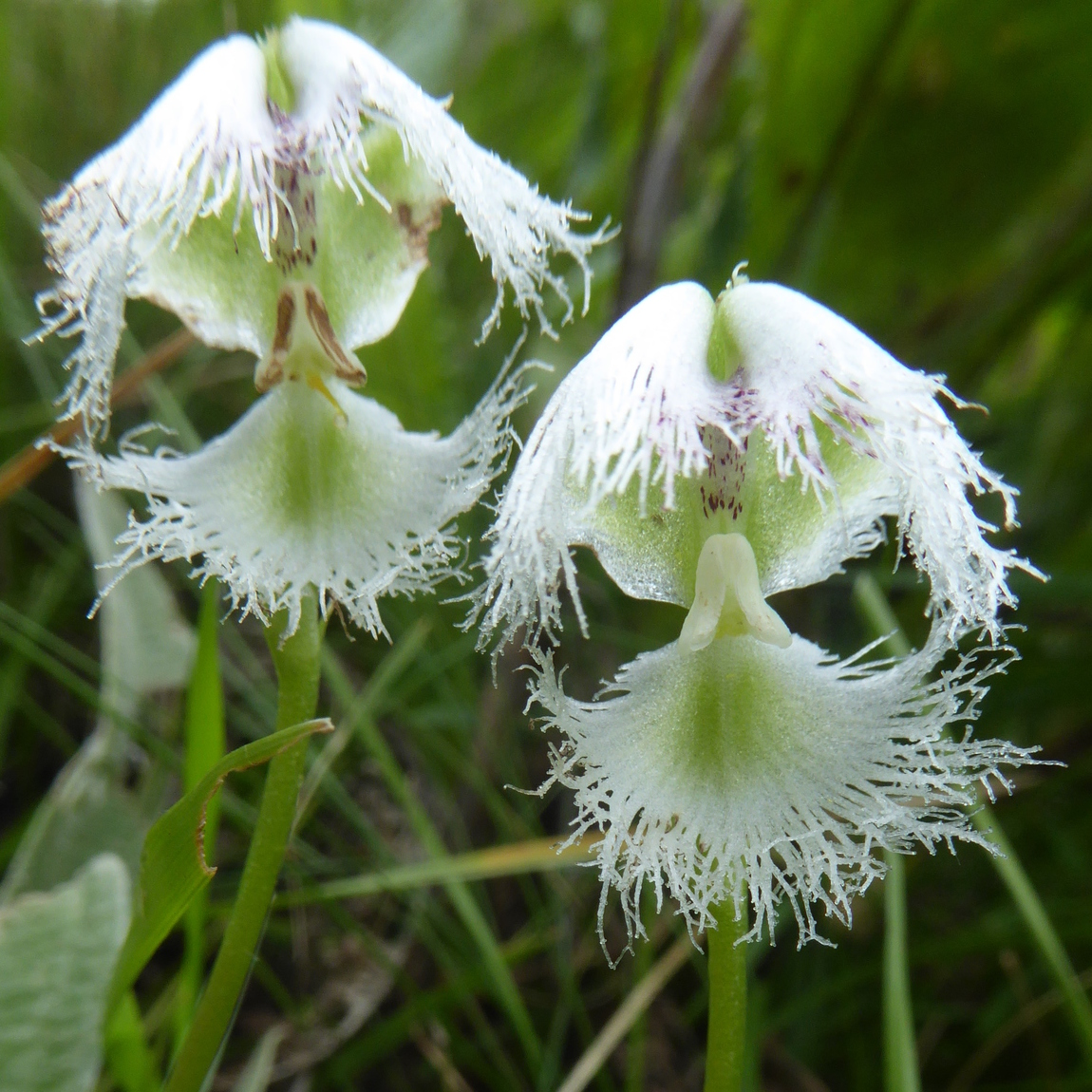
Huttonaea grandiflora
