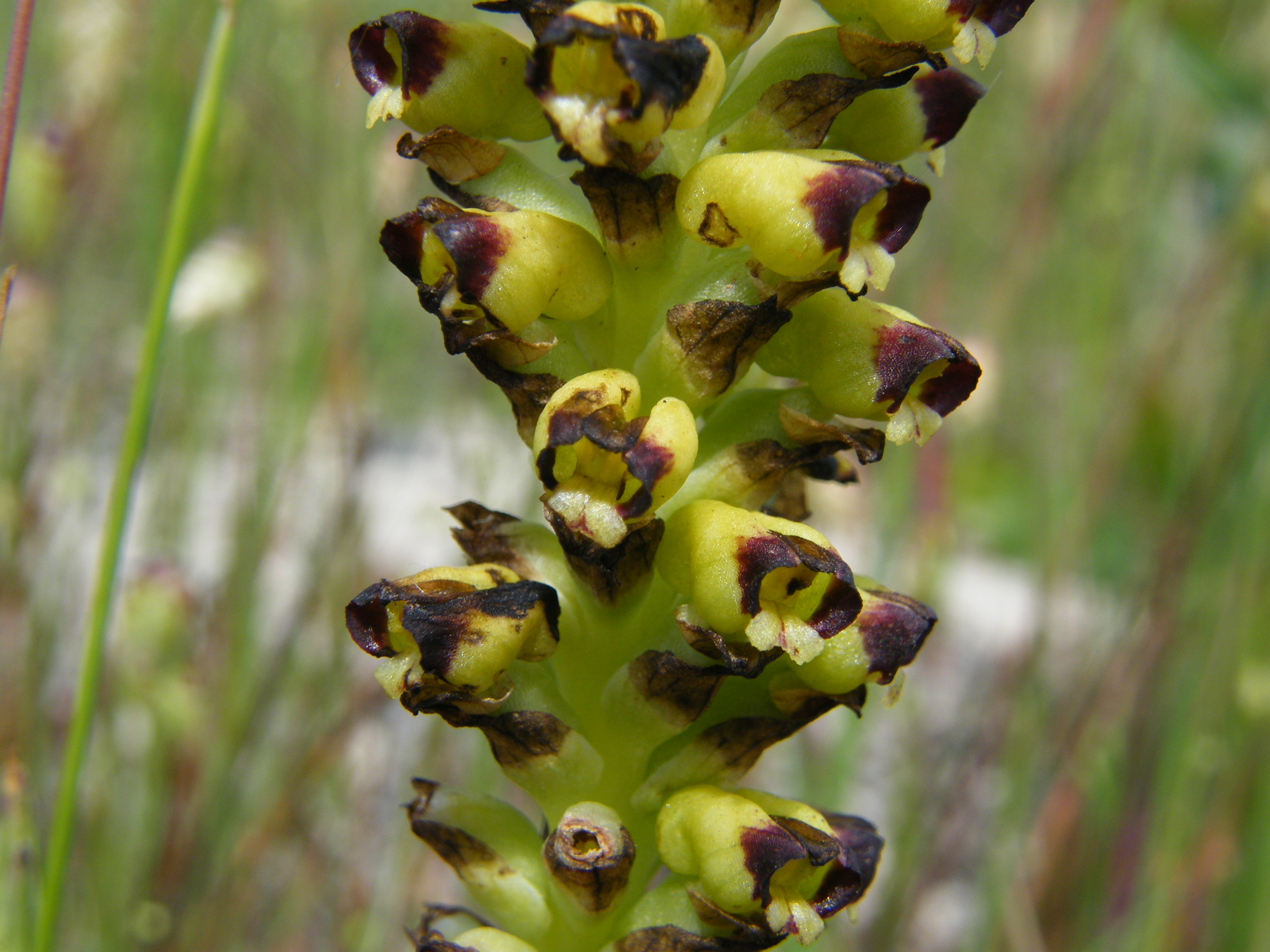
- Corycium orobanchoides

Scientific classification
- Kingdom: Plantae
- Clade: Tracheophytes
- Clade: Angiosperms
- Clade: Monocots
- Order: Asparagales
- Family: Orchidaceae
- Subfamily: Orchidoideae
- Tribe: Orchideae
- Subtribe: Coryciinae; Benth., J. Linn. Soc., Bot. 18: 288. 21 Feb (1881).

Genera
- Ceratandra; Corycium; Evotella; Pterygodium

= Coryciinae =

Subtribe of flowering plants in the orchid family

Coryciinae is a subtribe of orchids that has been differently defined and placed in the two classification systems that are currently in use for orchids. Genera Orchidacearum, which is currently the definitive work on orchid taxonomy, delimits Coryciinae as consisting of five genera: Disperis, Evotella, Ceratandra, Pterygodium, and Corycium, and it places Coryciinae in the mostly African tribe Diseae, along with four other subtribes: Brownleeinae, Huttonaeinae, Disinae, and Satyriinae. The genera of Coryciinae are small to medium in size and the number of species in each genus is as follows: Disperis (78), Pterygodium (19), Corycium (15), Ceratandra (6), and Evotella (1).

Coryciinae was covered, along with the rest of the tribe Diseae, in volume 2 of Genera Orchidacearum, which was published in 2001. Molecular phylogenetic studies published after 2001 showed that Disperis is most closely related to Brownleea, rather than to the other genera of Coryciinae. They also showed that the tribe Diseae is paraphyletic over the tribe Orchideae. The smaller version of Coryciinae, with Disperis excluded, is known as Coryciinae sensu stricto, and has 41 species. All are from southern Africa except Pterygodium ukingense, which is from Tanzania. Most are from the Cape Floristic Region. There is a second center of diversity in the Drakensberg. Coryciinae s.s. is distinct and supported by five morphological characters.

In the classification for orchids that was published by Chase et alii in 2015, Disperis was transferred to the subtribe Brownleeinae and the tribe Orchideae was expanded to include the former Diseae, with Coryciinae as one of its subtribes.

Coryciinae is monophyletic and consists of two strongly supported clades. One clade consists of Pterygodium alatum, Corycium carnosum, Evotella, and Ceratandra. The other clade consists of species of Pterygodium and Corycium, with Corycium nested within Pterygodium.

Coryciinae orchids secrete oil from a lip appendage on their flowers, and pollination occurs when female Rediviva bees (Melittidae) collect the oil, probably for use as a larval provision (Pauw 2006; fig. 1A). As with other orchids, pollen is placed onto precise locations on the body of the pollinator in packages called pollinaria (Pauw 2006; fig. 1B). The oil-secreting lineages of Coryciinae are largely endemic to South Africa, with two centers of diversity: a summer-rainfall area centered in the Drakensberg range and a winter-rainfall area in the Western Cape province and Namaqualand (Linder and Kurzweil 1999).

The subtribe Coryciinae was erected by George Bentham in 1881, in preparation for the publication of a new classification of orchids in the 1883 edition of Genera Plantarum (Bentham & Hooker). Using the suffixes of that time for taxonomic rank, he called it subtribe "Corycieae" of his now obsolete tribe Ophrydeae.

== See also ==
- Taxonomy of the Orchidaceae

== Sources ==
<Linder, H. P., and H. Kurzweil. 1999. Orchids of southern Africa. Rotterdam, Balkema.> First citation in article
