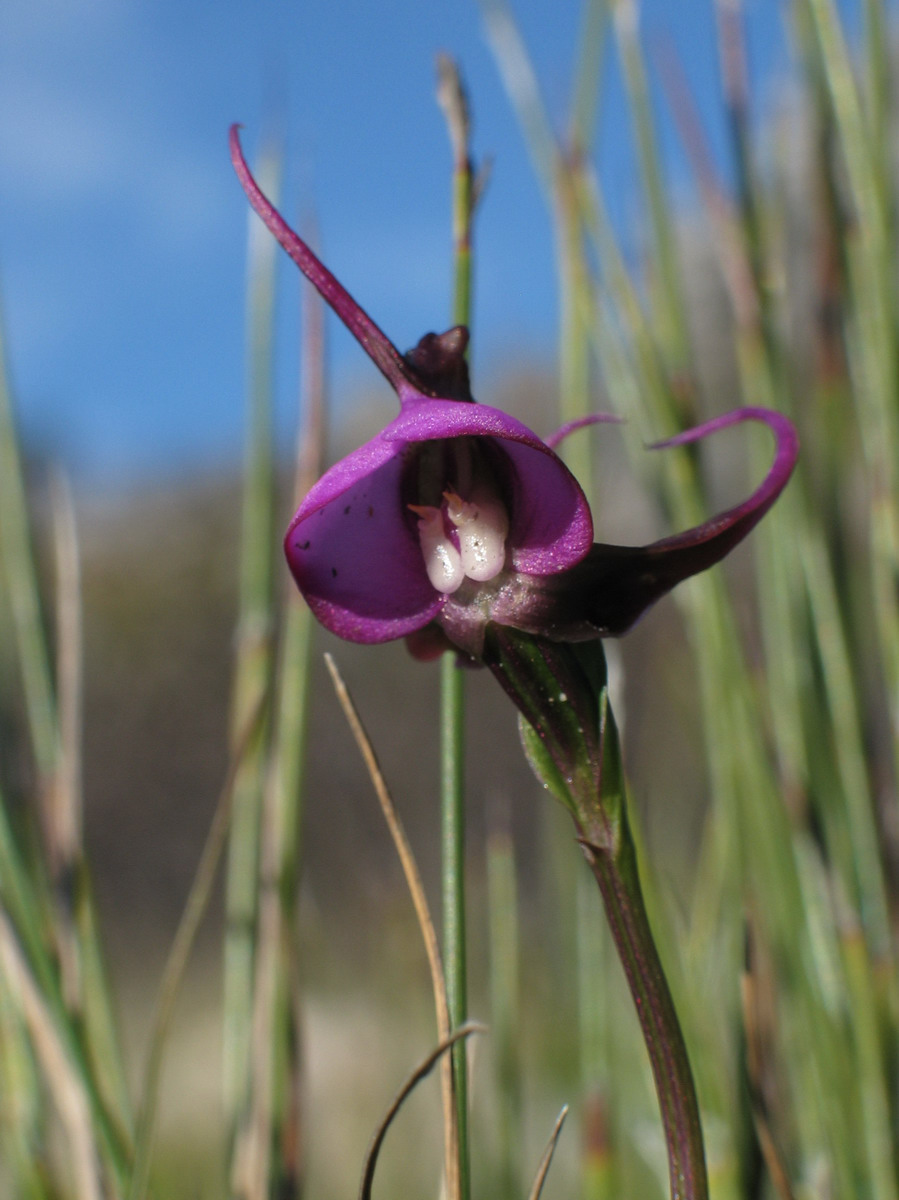
- Disperis capensis

Scientific classification
- Kingdom: Plantae
- Clade: Tracheophytes
- Clade: Angiosperms
- Clade: Monocots
- Order: Asparagales
- Family: Orchidaceae
- Subfamily: Orchidoideae
- Tribe: Orchideae
- Subtribe: Brownleeinae
- Genus: Disperis; Sw.

Subgenera
- D. subg. Disperis; D. subg. Dryorkis
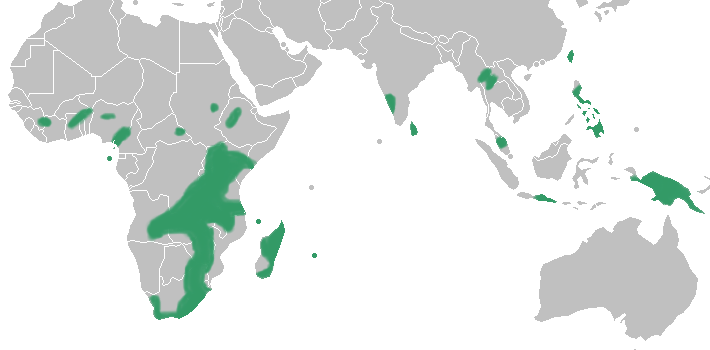
- Range of genus

= Disperis =

Genus of flowering plants belonging to the orchid family

Disperis is a genus of plants in the orchid family, Orchidaceae. It has about 78 species. Most of the species are from tropical and southern Africa, as well as Indian Ocean islands. A few are native to the tropical or the warmer subtropical regions of Asia and Malesia.

== Etymology ==
The genus name Disperis derives from the ancient greek δίς (dís), meaning "twice", and πήρα (pḗra), meaning "bag", "pouch", because of to the pouches formed by the lateral sepals.

== Range and variation ==
Disperis consists of two subgenera, Disperis and Dryorkis. Subgenus Disperis has been well sampled in a molecular phylogenetic study, but subgenus Dryorkis has not. Subgenus Disperis has about 30 species and is distinguished by an entire lip appendage. Most of its species are from southern Africa. A few are from East Africa and Madagascar. Subgenus Dryorkis has about 48 species and is distinguished by a 2-lobed lip appendage. It is found throughout tropical Africa as well as Madagascar and nearby islands, and it has one widespread species in tropical Asia.

== Pollination ==
Like members of the subtribe Coryciinae sensu stricto, Disperis is pollinated by oil collecting bees of the genus Rediviva. The oil is produced on the lip appendage, usually near its apex. Disperis has independently evolved a floral morphology much like that of Coryciinae s.s. in order to attract these pollinators.

== Relationships ==
In the Genera Orchidacearum work, Disperis has been placed in the subtribe Coryciinae. However, molecular phylogeny studies challenged this taxonomic view. Analysis of the nuclear ribosomal ITS first suggested the polyphyly of Coryciinae as Disperis did not branch with Corycium and Pterygodium. Moreover, Disperis appeared more closely related to Brownleea than to the subtribe Coryciinae, though this affinity did not receive strong statistical support. In a classification of orchids that was published in 2015, Disperis was transferred to the subtribe Brownleeinae. Brownleea and Disperis have a similar pollen structure and an upright labellum that lies over the front of the stigma. A median sepal spur is found in all six species of Brownleea and in many species of Disperis.
