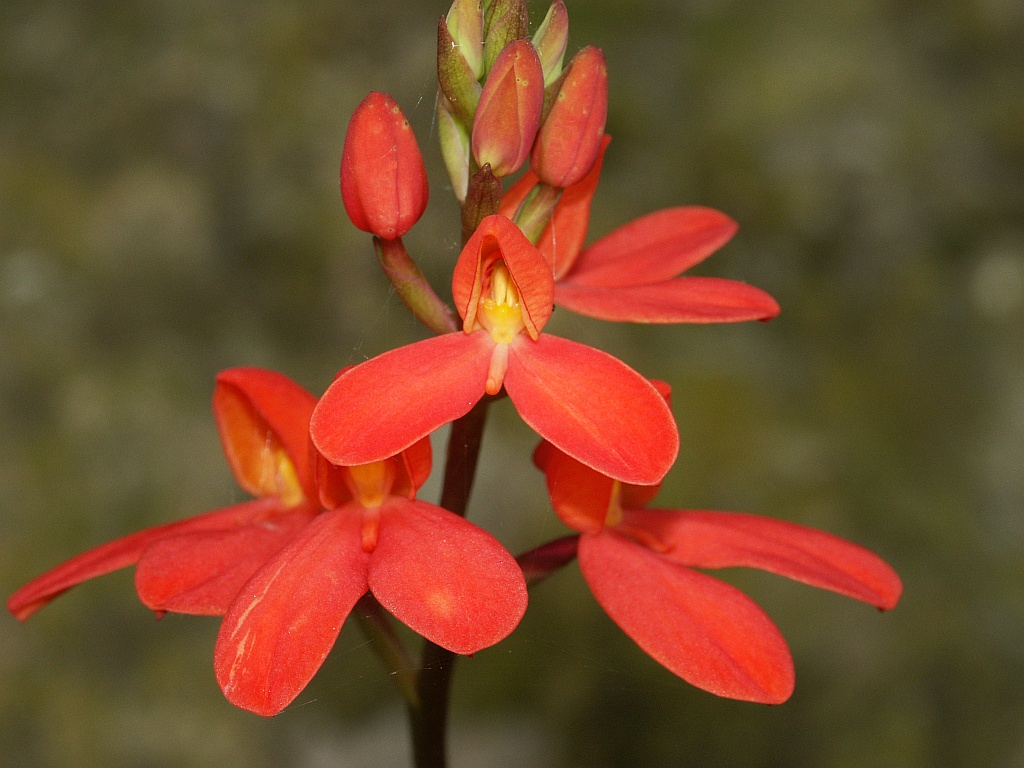
- Disa cardinalis

Scientific classification
- Kingdom: Plantae
- Clade: Tracheophytes
- Clade: Angiosperms
- Clade: Monocots
- Order: Asparagales
- Family: Orchidaceae
- Subfamily: Orchidoideae
- Tribe: Diseae; Benth. & Hook. (1883)

Subtribes
- Brownleeinae; Coryciinae; Disinae; Huttonaeinae; Satyriinae

= Diseae =

Tribe of orchids

Diseae is an orchid tribe in the subfamily Orchidoideae. It was recognized in Genera Orchidacearum volume 2, which was published in 2001. It consisted of 12 genera in five subtribes. In molecular phylogenetic studies that were published after 1999, it was shown that Diseae is paraphyletic over the tribe Orchideae. In a classification of orchids that was published in 2015, Diseae was not recognized, but was instead placed in synonymy under Orchideae.

In 2007, a molecular phylogenetic study showed that the large genus Disa (~182 species) is paraphyletic over the small genus Schizodium. Accordingly, in the 2015 classification, the genus Schizodium was sunk into Disa. Also, the subtribe Huttonaeinae was sunk into Disinae, and the subtribe Satyriinae was sunk into Orchidinae. The expanded tribe Orchideae consisted of the subtribes Brownleeinae, Disinae, Coryciinae, and Orchidinae. Disperis was transferred from Coryciinae to Brownleeinae and Pachites was transferred from Satyriinae to Disinae. The placement of Pachites and Huttonaea in Disinae was done with considerable doubt. Four genera were recognized in the subtribe Coryciinae (Evotella, Ceratandra, Corycium and Pterygodium), even though it was known that Corycium and Pterygodium are polyphyletic, with all but one species of Corycium composing a clade that is deeply embedded within Pterygodium.

The genera of Diseae have most or all of their species in southern Africa and Madagascar. Diseae accounts for more than half of the orchids of southern Africa and has about 400 species. Disperis has a few species in tropical Africa and Asia, including Malesia. Disa extends to the Arabian Peninsula and the Mascarene Islands. Pterygodium has one species in Tanzania. Satyrium is mostly African, but extends through South Asia to China.
