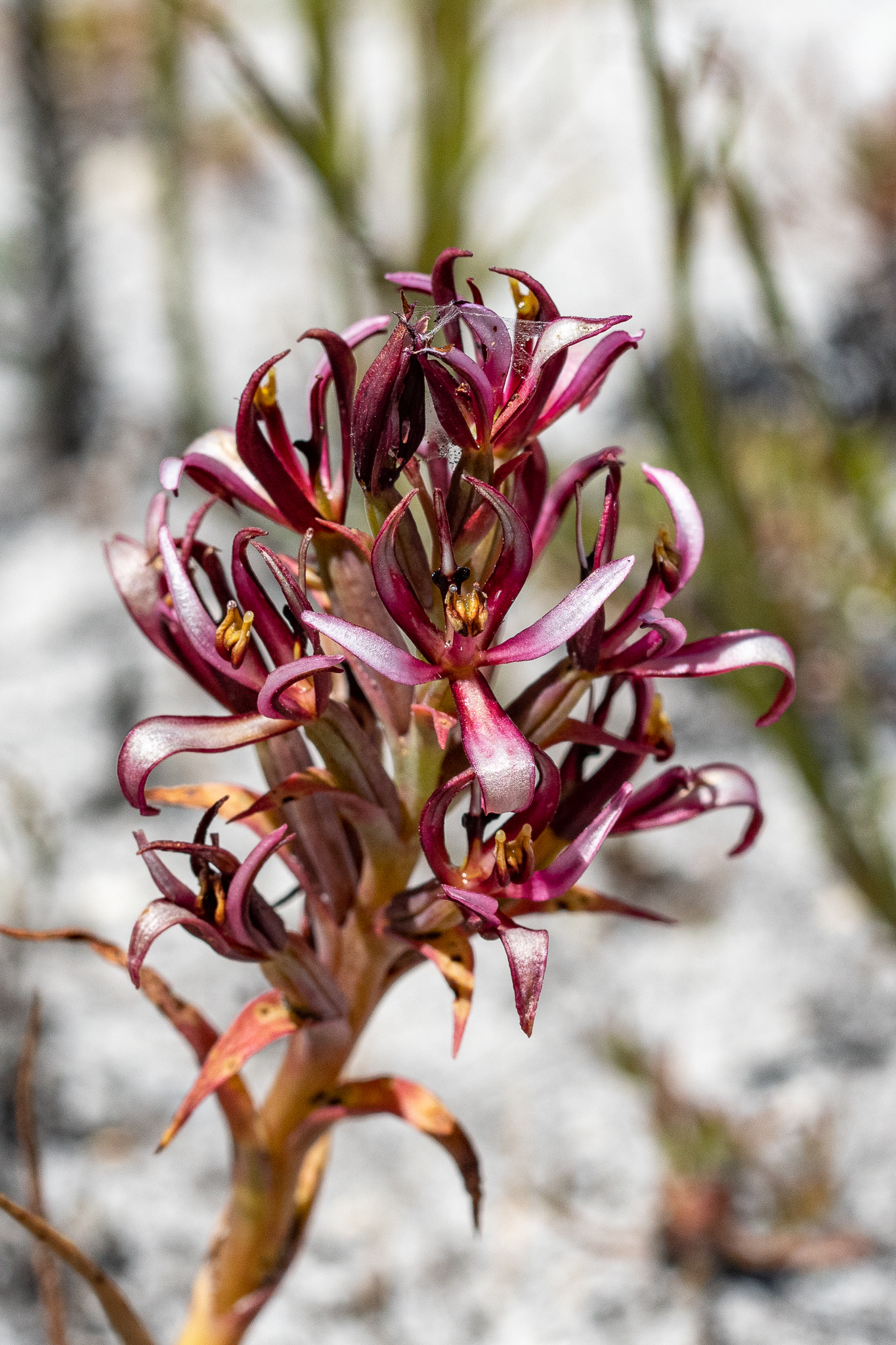
- Pachites bodkinii
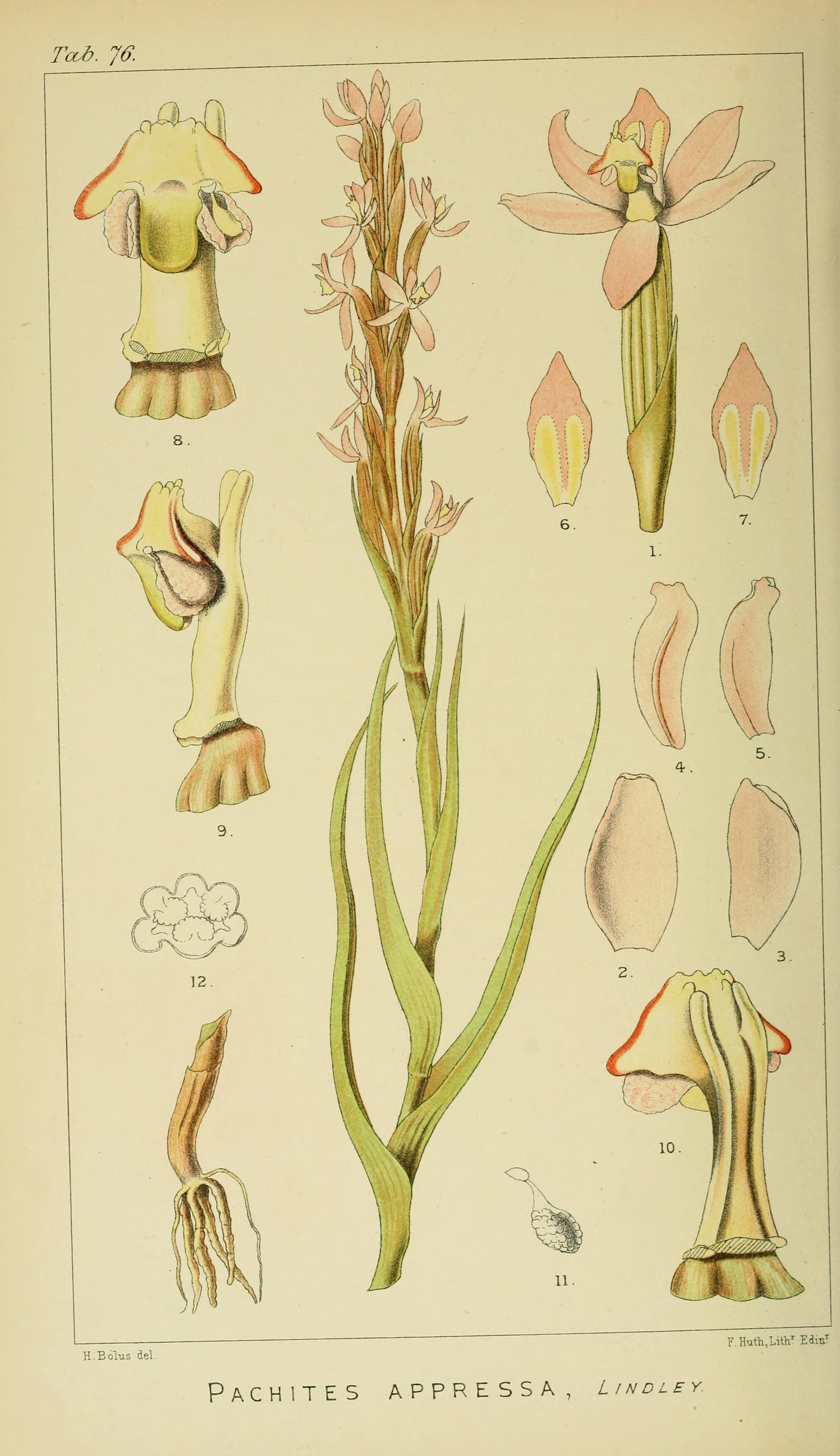
- Botanical illustration of Pachites appressus

Scientific classification
- Kingdom: Plantae
- Clade: Tracheophytes
- Clade: Angiosperms
- Clade: Monocots
- Order: Asparagales
- Family: Orchidaceae
- Subfamily: Orchidoideae
- Tribe: Orchideae
- Subtribe: Pachitinae; G.Z.Chen, Z.J.Liu & S.P.Chen
- Genus: Pachites; Lindl.

= Pachites =

Genus of flowering plants belonging to the orchid family

Pachites is a genus of flowering plants in the orchid family, Orchidaceae. It contains two known species, both endemic to South Africa. One of these, Pachites appressus, is very rare.

Pachites was named by John Lindley in 1835. The name is derived from the Greek word pachys, meaning "thick, stout", and refers to the rostellum.

In Genera Orchidacearum volume 2, Pachites and Satyrium constitute the subtribe Satyriinae of the tribe Diseae. After that work was published in 2001, molecular phylogenetic studies showed that Pachites does not form a clade with Satyrium. Instead, Pachites occupies a basal position in Diseae. In spite of the papers published in 2008 and 2009, uncertainties remain over the exact relationships of Pachites to other genera. In a classification of orchids that was published in 2015, Pachites, Disa, and Huttonaea constitute the subtribe Disinae of the tribe Orchideae. This circumscription of Disinae, however, was done provisionally, to avoid creating new subtribes before further studies could determine, with increased certainty, the true affinities of these three genera.

== Species ==
Species	Range	Image
Pachites appressus John Lindley, 1835	Langeberg Mountains	
Pachites bodkinii Harry Bolus, 1893	Cape Province	

== See also ==
- List of Orchidaceae genera

== Sources ==
- Berg Pana, H. 2005. Handbuch der Orchideen-Namen. Dictionary of Orchid Names. Dizionario dei nomi delle orchidee. Ulmer, Stuttgart
