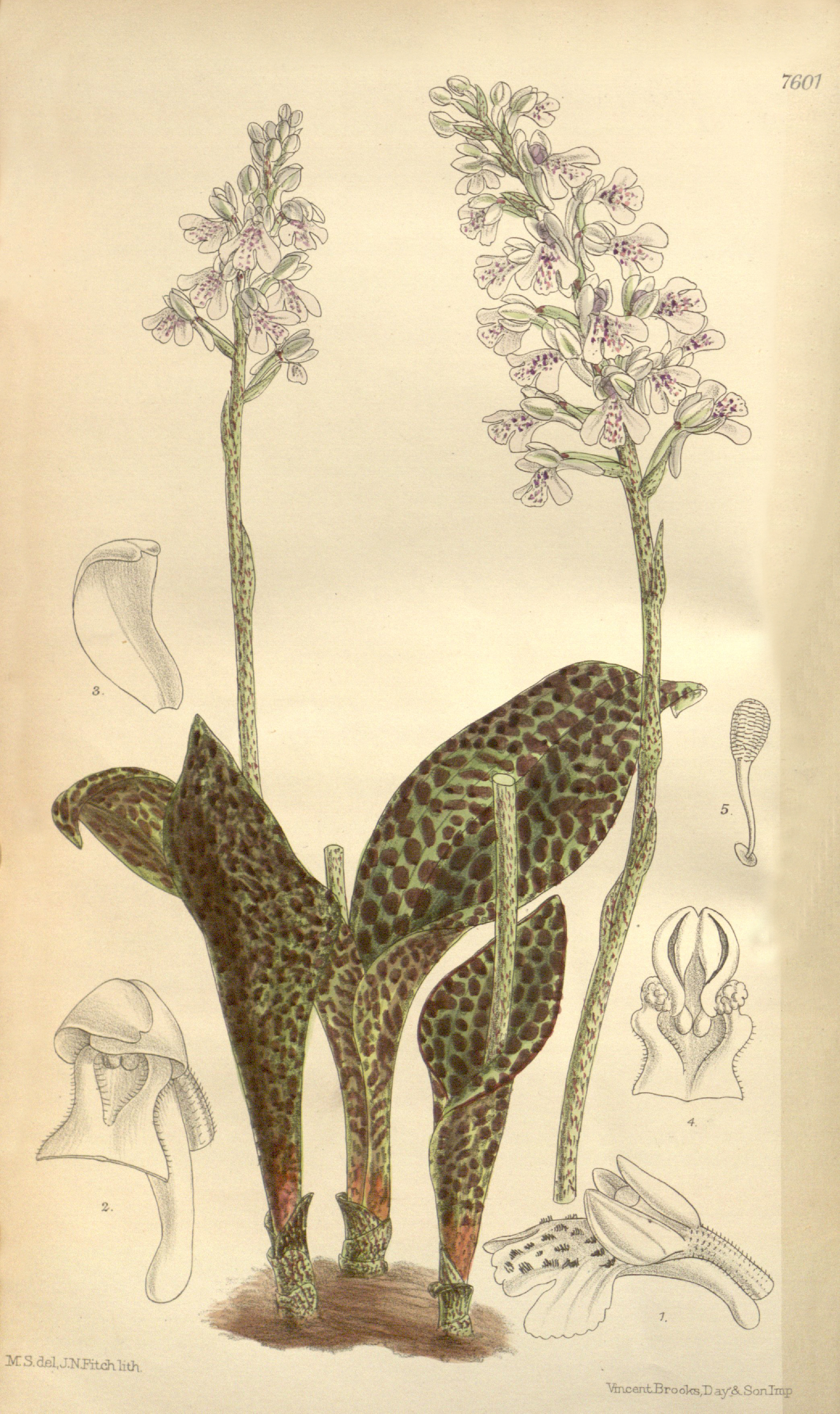
- Botanical illustration of Sirindhornia monophylla (as Orchis monophylla)

Scientific classification
- Kingdom: Plantae
- Clade: Tracheophytes
- Clade: Angiosperms
- Clade: Monocots
- Order: Asparagales
- Family: Orchidaceae
- Subfamily: Orchidoideae
- Tribe: Orchideae
- Subtribe: Orchidinae
- Genus: Sirindhornia; H.A.Pedersen & Suksathan

= Sirindhornia (plant) =

Genus of flowering plants

Sirindhornia is a genus of flowering plants in the family Orchidaceae native to China and Indochina. It contains three known species.

- Sirindhornia mirabilis H.A.Pedersen & Suksathan - Thailand
- Sirindhornia monophylla (Collett & Hemsl.) H.A.Pedersen & Suksathan - Yunnan, Thailand, Myanmar
- Sirindhornia pulchella H.A.Pedersen & Indham. - Thailand

== See also ==
- List of Orchidaceae genera
