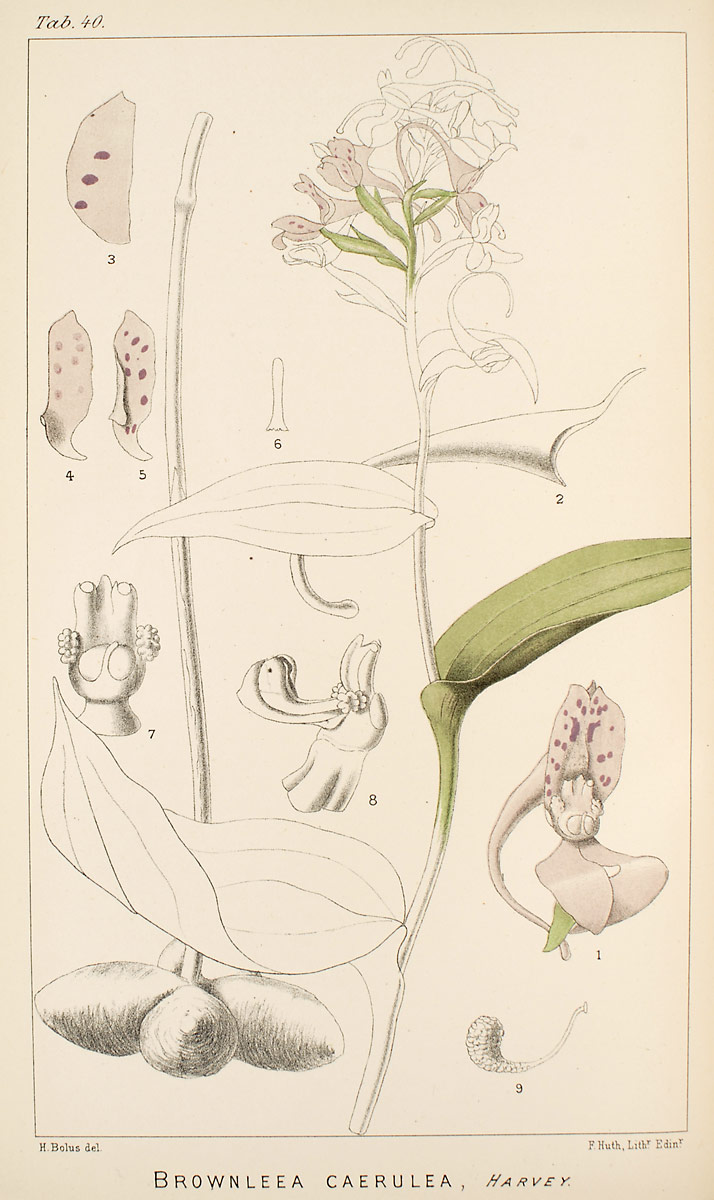
- Brownleea caerulea

Scientific classification
- Kingdom: Plantae
- Clade: Tracheophytes
- Clade: Angiosperms
- Clade: Monocots
- Order: Asparagales
- Family: Orchidaceae
- Subfamily: Orchidoideae
- Tribe: Orchideae
- Subtribe: Brownleeinae
- Genus: Brownleea; Harv. ex Lindl.

= Brownleea =

Genus of flowering plants in the orchid family

Brownleea is a genus of flowering plants from the family Orchidaceae native to Africa and Madagascar. Eight species are known.

- Brownleea coerulea Harv. ex Lindl.
- Brownleea galpinii Bolus
- Brownleea graminicola McMurtry
- Brownleea macroceras Sond.
- Brownleea maculata P.J.Cribb
- Brownleea mulanjiensis H.P.Linder
- Brownleea parviflora Harv. ex Lindl.
- Brownleea recurvata Sond.

In a classification of orchids that was published in 2015, the genera Brownleea and Disperis constituted the subtribe Brownleeinae of the tribe Orchideae. A sister relationship between Brownleea and Disperis received only weak statistical support in a 2009 study. In Genera Orchidacearum, the subtribe Brownleeinae was placed in the tribe Diseae, but this tribe is no longer recognized because it has been shown to be paraphyletic over the tribe Orchideae.

== See also ==
- List of Orchidaceae genera
