= Hsenhsua =

Scientific classification
- Kingdom: Plantae
- Clade: Embryophytes
- Clade: Tracheophytes
- Clade: Angiosperms
- Clade: Monocots
- Order: Asparagales
- Family: Orchidaceae
- Subfamily: Orchidoideae
- Tribe: Orchideae
- Subtribe: Orchidinae
- Genus: Hsenhsua; X.H.Jin, Schuit. & W.T.Jin
- Species: H. chrysea

Binomial name
- Hsenhsua chrysea (W.W.Sm.) X.H.Jin, Schuit., W.T.Jin & L.Q.Huang

Synonyms
- Chusua chrysea (W.W.Sm.) P.F.Hunt; Habenaria chrysea W.W.Sm.; Orchis chrysea (W.W.Sm.) Schltr.; Ponerorchis chrysea (W.W.Sm.) Soó

Genus of flowering plants

Hsenhsua is a genus of flowering plant in the family Orchidaceae. Its only species is Hsenhsua chrysea, native to Bhutan to South Central China. It is placed in the tribe Orchideae.

The genus was first described in 2014. The species Hsenhsua chrysea was first described, as Habenaria chrysea, by William Wright Smith in 1921.
