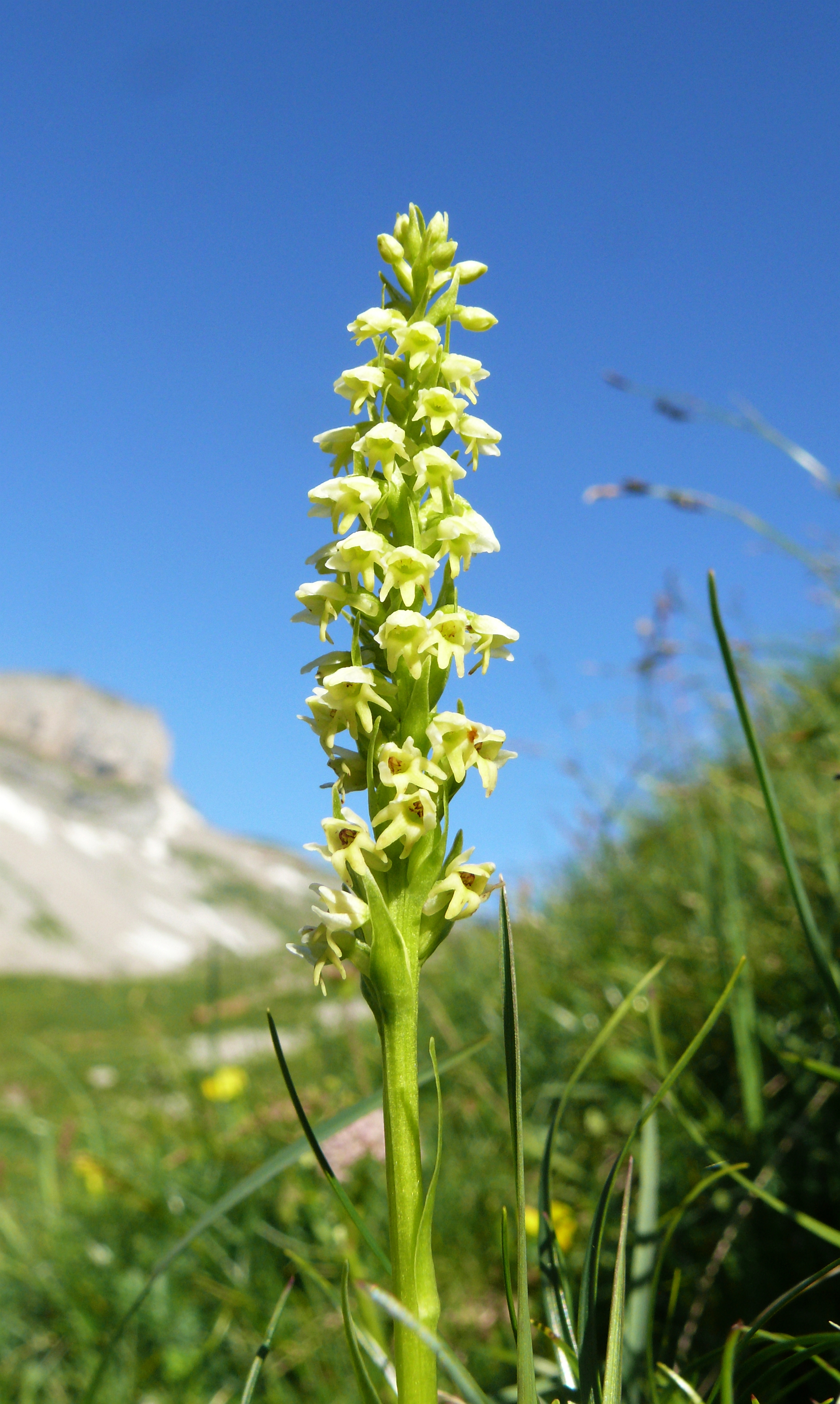
- Pseudorchis albida in Austria

Scientific classification
- Kingdom: Plantae
- Clade: Tracheophytes
- Clade: Angiosperms
- Clade: Monocots
- Order: Asparagales
- Family: Orchidaceae
- Subfamily: Orchidoideae
- Tribe: Orchideae
- Subtribe: Orchidinae
- Genus: Pseudorchis; Ség.
- Species: P. albida

Binomial name
- Pseudorchis albida (L.) Á.Löve & D.Löve

Synonyms
- Leucorchis E.Mey; Triplorhiza Ehrh.; Polybactrum Salisb.; Bicchia Parl.; Satyrium albidum L.; Orchis albida (L.) Scop.; Habenaria albida (L.) R.Br. in W.T.Aiton; Gymnadenia albida (L.) Rich.; Sieberia albida (L.) Spreng.; Coeloglossum albidum (L.) Hartm.; Entaticus albidus (L.) Gray; Chamorchis albida (L.) Dumort.; Platanthera albida (L.) Lindl.; Peristylus albidus (L.) Lindl.; Leucorchis albida (L.) E.Mey. in C.A.Patze, E.H.F.Meyer & L.Elkan; Bicchia albida (L.) Parl.; Pseudorchis alpina Ség.; Orchis alpina (Ség.) Crantz; Satyrium trifidum Vill.; Orchis parviflora Poir. in J.B.A.M.de Lamarck; Satyrium scanense L. ex Steud.; Blephariglottis albiflora Raf.; Habenaria transsilvanica Schur; Leucorchis lucida Fuss; Gymnadenia albida var. borensis Zapal.

= Pseudorchis =

Genus of orchids

Pseudorchis is a monotypic genus of flowering plants from the orchid family, Orchidaceae. The sole species is the small white orchid (Pseudorchis albida). It is found across much of Europe and northern Asia from Spain and Iceland to Kamchatka, including France, Great Britain, Germany, Poland, Scandinavia, Ukraine and much of Russia. It also occurs in Greenland and eastern Canada (Quebec, Newfoundland and Labrador). (Codes)

Three subspecies are recognized:

- Pseudorchis albida subsp. albida - from Spain and Iceland to Kamchatka
- Pseudorchis albida subsp. straminea (Fernald) Á.Löve & D.Löve - Scandinavia, northern Russia, Greenland, Canada
- Pseudorchis albida subsp. tricuspis (Beck) E.Klein - Sweden, Switzerland, Austria, Poland, Romania, former Yugoslavia

== See also ==
- List of Orchidaceae genera
