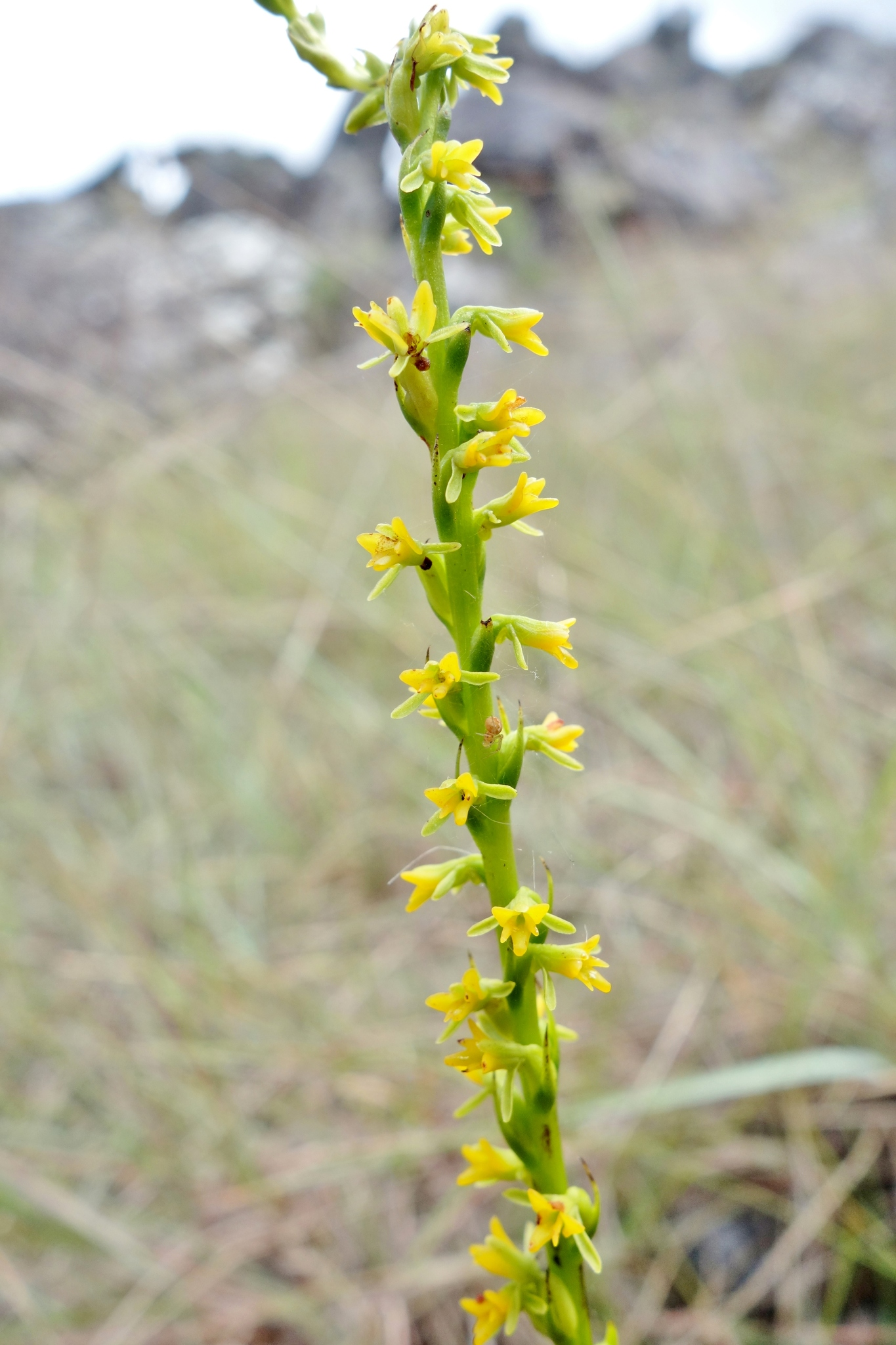
- Benthamia cinnabarina

Scientific classification
- Kingdom: Plantae
- Clade: Tracheophytes
- Clade: Angiosperms
- Clade: Monocots
- Order: Asparagales
- Family: Orchidaceae
- Subfamily: Orchidoideae
- Tribe: Orchideae
- Subtribe: Orchidinae
- Genus: Benthamia; A.Rich.

Synonyms
- Rolfeella Schltr.

= Benthamia =

Genus of flowering plants

Benthamia is a genus of orchids. It contains 29 recognized species, all native to Madagascar, Mauritius and Réunion.

== List of species ==
- Benthamia bathieana Schltr., Repert. Spec. Nov. Regni Veg. Beih. 33: 25 (1924).
- Benthamia calceolata H.Perrier, Bull. Soc. Bot. France 81: 32 (1934).
- Benthamia catatiana H.Perrier, Bull. Soc. Bot. France 81: 29 (1934).
- Benthamia chlorantha (Spreng.) Garay & G.A.Romero, Harvard Pap. Bot. 3: 53 (1998).
- Benthamia cinnabarina (Rolfe) H.Perrier, Bull. Soc. Bot. France 81: 38 (1934).
- Benthamia cuspidata H.Perrier, Bull. Soc. Bot. France 81: 29 (1934).
- Benthamia dauphinensis (Rolfe) Schltr., Repert. Spec. Nov. Regni Veg. Beih. 33: 25 (1924).
- Benthamia elata Schltr., Repert. Spec. Nov. Regni Veg. 15: 324 (1918).
- Benthamia exilis Schltr., Repert. Spec. Nov. Regni Veg. Beih. 33: 26 (1924).
- Benthamia glaberrima (Ridl.) H.Perrier, Bull. Soc. Bot. France 81: 28 (1934).
- Benthamia herminioides Schltr., Repert. Spec. Nov. Regni Veg. Beih. 33: 27 (1924).
- Benthamia humbertii H.Perrier, Bull. Soc. Bot. France 81: 35 (1934).
- Benthamia longicalceata H.Perrier, Notul. Syst. (Paris) 14: 139 (1951).
- Benthamia macra Schltr., Repert. Spec. Nov. Regni Veg. Beih. 33: 28 (1924).
- Benthamia madagascariensis (Rolfe) Schltr., Beih. Bot. Centralbl. 34(2): 300 (1916).
- Benthamia majoriflora H.Perrier, Notul. Syst. (Paris) 14: 140 (1951).
- Benthamia melanopoda Schltr., Repert. Spec. Nov. Regni Veg. Beih. 33: 29 (1924).
- Benthamia misera (Ridl.) Schltr., Repert. Spec. Nov. Regni Veg. Beih. 33: 24 (1924).
- Benthamia monophylla Schltr., Repert. Spec. Nov. Regni Veg. Beih. 33: 30 (1924).
- Benthamia nigrescens Schltr., Beih. Bot. Centralbl. 34(2): 301 (1916).
- Benthamia nigrovaginata H.Perrier, Bull. Soc. Bot. France 81: 32 (1934).
- Benthamia nivea Schltr., Repert. Spec. Nov. Regni Veg. Beih. 33: 31 (1924).
- Benthamia perfecunda H.Perrier, Notul. Syst. (Paris) 14: 140 (1951).
- Benthamia perularioides Schltr., Repert. Spec. Nov. Regni Veg. Beih. 33: 32 (1924).
- Benthamia praecox Schltr., Beih. Bot. Centralbl. 34(1): 303 (1916).
- Benthamia procera Schltr., Beih. Bot. Centralbl. 34(1): 301 (1916).
- Benthamia rostrata Schltr., Repert. Spec. Nov. Regni Veg. Beih. 33: 33 (1924).
- Benthamia spiralis (Thouars) A.Rich., Mém. Soc. Hist. Nat. Paris 4: 39 (1828).
- Benthamia verecunda Schltr., Repert. Spec. Nov. Regni Veg. Beih. 33: 34 (1924).
