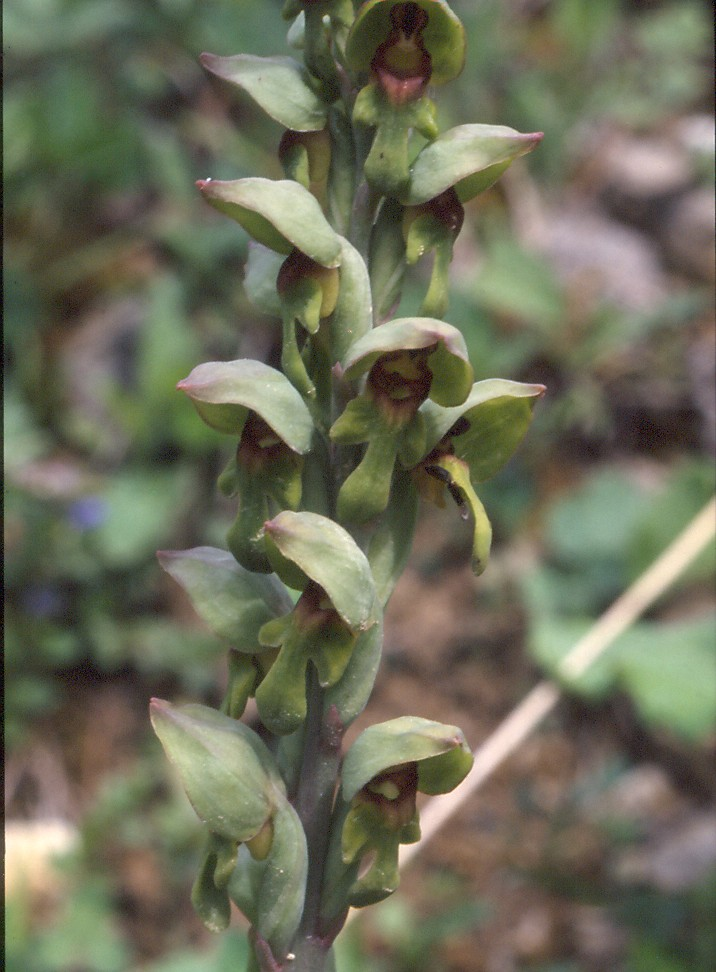

Scientific classification
- Kingdom: Plantae
- Clade: Tracheophytes
- Clade: Angiosperms
- Clade: Monocots
- Order: Asparagales
- Family: Orchidaceae
- Subfamily: Orchidoideae
- Tribe: Orchideae
- Subtribe: Orchidinae
- Genus: Steveniella; Schltr.
- Species: S. satyrioides

Binomial name
- Steveniella satyrioides (Spreng.) Schltr.

Synonyms
- Himantoglossum satyrioides Spreng.; Peristylus satyrioides (Spreng.) Rchb.f.; Coeloglossum satyrioides (Spreng.) Nyman; Habenaria satyrioides (Spreng.) Benth. ex Schltr., invalid; Stevenorchis satyrioides (Spreng.) Wankow & Kraenzl.; Orchis satyrioides Steven, illegitimate; Orchis satyrioides f. longibracteata Wankow; Steveniella satyrioides f. longibracteata (Wankow) Soó; Steveniella caucasica Garay, illegitimate; Orchis prosteveniella P.Delforge; Steveniella satyrioides var. iranica Kreutz; Stevenorchis Wankow & Kraenzl., illegitimate

= Steveniella =

Genus of orchids

Steveniella is a genus of flowering plants from the orchid family, Orchidaceae. Only one species is known, Steveniella satyrioides, native to Iran, Turkey, Crimea and the Caucasus.

Steveniella satyrioides is considered an endangered species in Armenia.

== See also ==
- List of Orchidaceae genera
