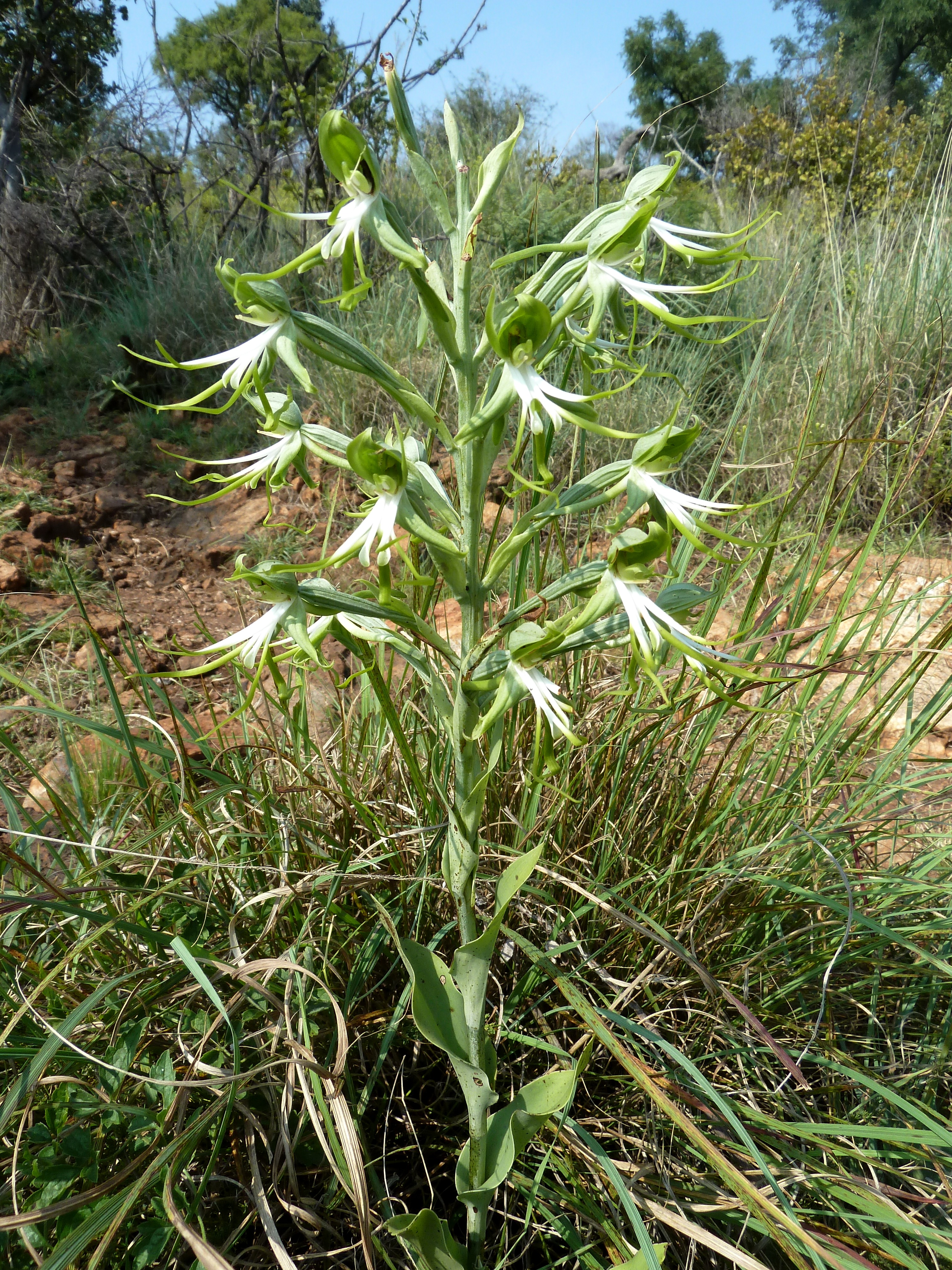
- Bonatea antennifera

Scientific classification
- Kingdom: Plantae
- Clade: Tracheophytes
- Clade: Angiosperms
- Clade: Monocots
- Order: Asparagales
- Family: Orchidaceae
- Subfamily: Orchidoideae
- Tribe: Orchideae
- Subtribe: Orchidinae
- Genus: Bonatea; Willd.

Type species
- Bonatea speciosa (L.f.) Willd.

= Bonatea (plant) =

Genus of flowering plants

Bonatea is a genus of orchids native to tropical and southern Africa, with one species extending into Yemen and Saudi Arabia.

Species currently recognized as of May 2014:

- Bonatea antennifera Rolfe - South Africa, Mozambique, Botswana, Zimbabwe
- Bonatea boltonii (Harv.) Bolus - South Africa
- Bonatea cassidea Sond. - South Africa, Eswatini, Zimbabwe
- Bonatea lamprophylla J.Stewart - Mozambique, KwaZulu-Natal
- Bonatea polypodantha (Rchb.f.) L.Bolus - South Africa
- Bonatea porrecta (Bolus) Summerh. - South Africa, Mozambique, Botswana, Eswatini
- Bonatea pulchella Summerh. - Mozambique, KwaZulu-Natal, Transvaal
- Bonatea rabaiensis (Rendle) Rolfe in D.Oliver - Kenya, Tanzania
- Bonatea saundersioides (Kraenzl. & Schltr.) Cortesi - Mpumalanga, KwaZulu-Natal, Eswatini
- Bonatea speciosa (L.f.) Willd. - South Africa, Mozambique
- Bonatea stereophylla (Kraenzl.) Summerh. - Tanzania
- Bonatea steudneri (Rchb.f.) T.Durand & Schinz - from South Africa to Saudi Arabia, including Democratic Republic of the Congo, Tanzania, Angola, Mozambique, Sudan, Ethiopia, etc.
- Bonatea volkensiana (Kraenzl.) Rolfe in D.Oliver - Kenya, Tanzania
