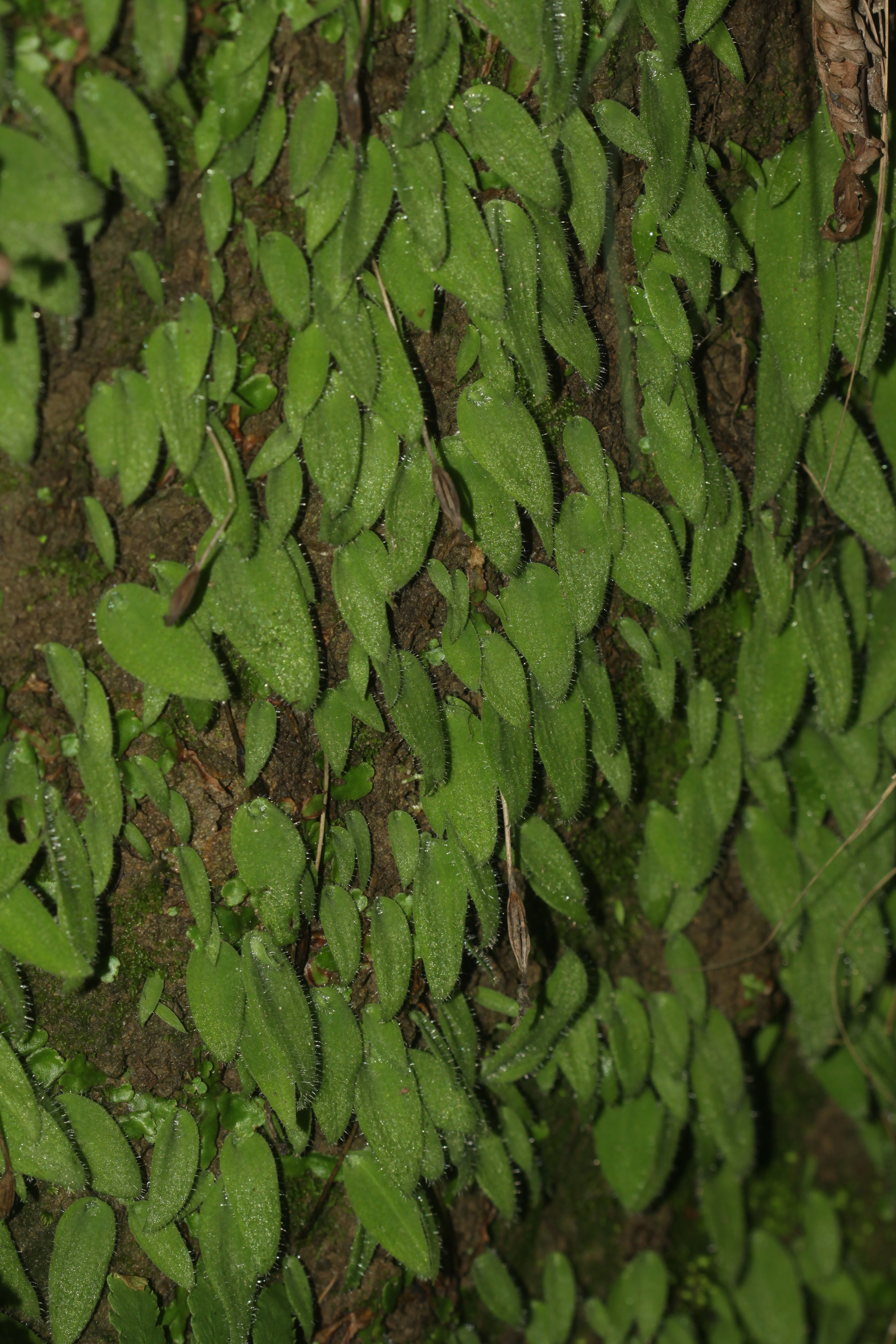
- Diplomeris hirsuta

Scientific classification
- Kingdom: Plantae
- Clade: Tracheophytes
- Clade: Angiosperms
- Clade: Monocots
- Order: Asparagales
- Family: Orchidaceae
- Subfamily: Orchidoideae
- Tribe: Orchideae
- Subtribe: Orchidinae
- Genus: Diplomeris; D.Don

Synonyms
- Paragnathis Spreng.; Diplochilos Lindl.

= Diplomeris =

Genus of orchids

Diplomeris is a genus of flowering plants from the orchid family, Orchidaceae. It is native to China, the Indian subcontinent, and southeast Asia. Three species are currently recognized (June 2014):

- Diplomeris hirsuta (Lindl.) Lindl. - India, Nepal, Bhutan, Assam, China
- Diplomeris josephi A.N.Rao & Swamin. - Arunachal Pradesh
- Diplomeris pulchella D.Don - India, Nepal, Bhutan, Assam, Myanmar, Thailand, Vietnam, Tibet, Guizhou, Sichuan, Yunnan

== See also ==
- List of Orchidaceae genera
