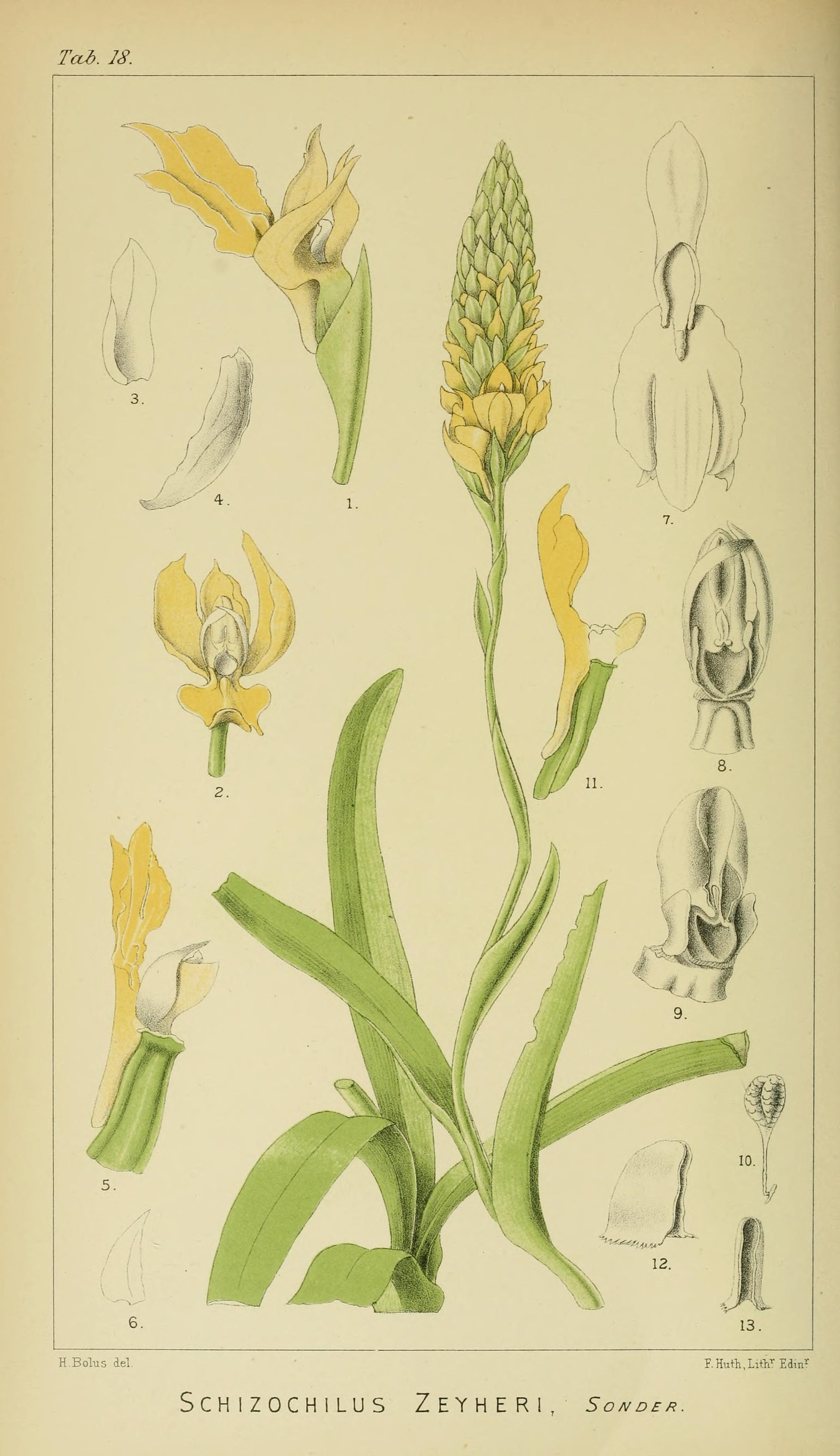

Scientific classification
- Kingdom: Plantae
- Clade: Tracheophytes
- Clade: Angiosperms
- Clade: Monocots
- Order: Asparagales
- Family: Orchidaceae
- Subfamily: Orchidoideae
- Tribe: Orchideae
- Subtribe: Orchidinae
- Genus: Schizochilus; Sond.

= Schizochilus =

Genus of flowering plants

Schizochilus is a genus of flowering plants from the orchid family, Orchidaceae. It is native to southern and eastern Africa.

Species accepted as of June 2014:

- Schizochilus angustifolius Rolfe in W.H.Harvey & auct. suc. - South Africa
- Schizochilus bulbinella (Rchb.f.) Bolus - South Africa, Lesotho
- Schizochilus calcaratus P.J.Cribb & la Croix - Zimbabwe
- Schizochilus cecilii Rolfe - South Africa, Zimbabwe, Eswatini
- Schizochilus crenulatus H.P.Linder - Mpumalanga
- Schizochilus flexuosus Harv. ex Rolfe in W.H.Harvey & auct. suc. - South Africa, Lesotho
- Schizochilus gerrardii (Rchb.f.) Bolus - KwaZulu-Natal
- Schizochilus lepidus Summerh. - Zimbabwe, Mozambique
- Schizochilus lilacinus Schelpe ex H.P.Linder - Mpumalanga
- Schizochilus sulphureus Schltr. - Mozambique, Malawi, Tanzania
- Schizochilus zeyheri Sond. - South Africa, Eswatini

== See also ==
- List of Orchidaceae genera
