= Tylostigma =

Scientific classification
- Kingdom: Plantae
- Clade: Tracheophytes
- Clade: Angiosperms
- Clade: Monocots
- Order: Asparagales
- Family: Orchidaceae
- Subfamily: Orchidoideae
- Tribe: Orchideae
- Subtribe: Orchidinae
- Genus: Tylostigma; Schltr.

Genus of orchids

Tylostigma is a genus of flowering plants from the orchid family Orchidaceae, endemic to Madagascar.

== Species ==
As of November 2025, Plants of the World Online accepted the following species:

- Tylostigma filiforme H.Perrier
- Tylostigma foliosum Schltr.
- Tylostigma herminioides Schltr.
- Tylostigma hildebrandtii (Ridl.) Schltr.
- Tylostigma madagascariense Schltr.
- Tylostigma nigrescens Schltr.
- Tylostigma perrieri Schltr.
- Tylostigma tenellum Schltr.

== See also ==
- List of Orchidaceae genera
