= Satyrium alpinum =

Satyrium alpinum is a botanical synonym of two species of plant:

- Chamorchis alpina the synonym published in 1807 by Christiaan Hendrik Persoon
- Dactylorhiza viridis var. viridis the synonym published in 1793 by Carl Friedrich Schmidt
