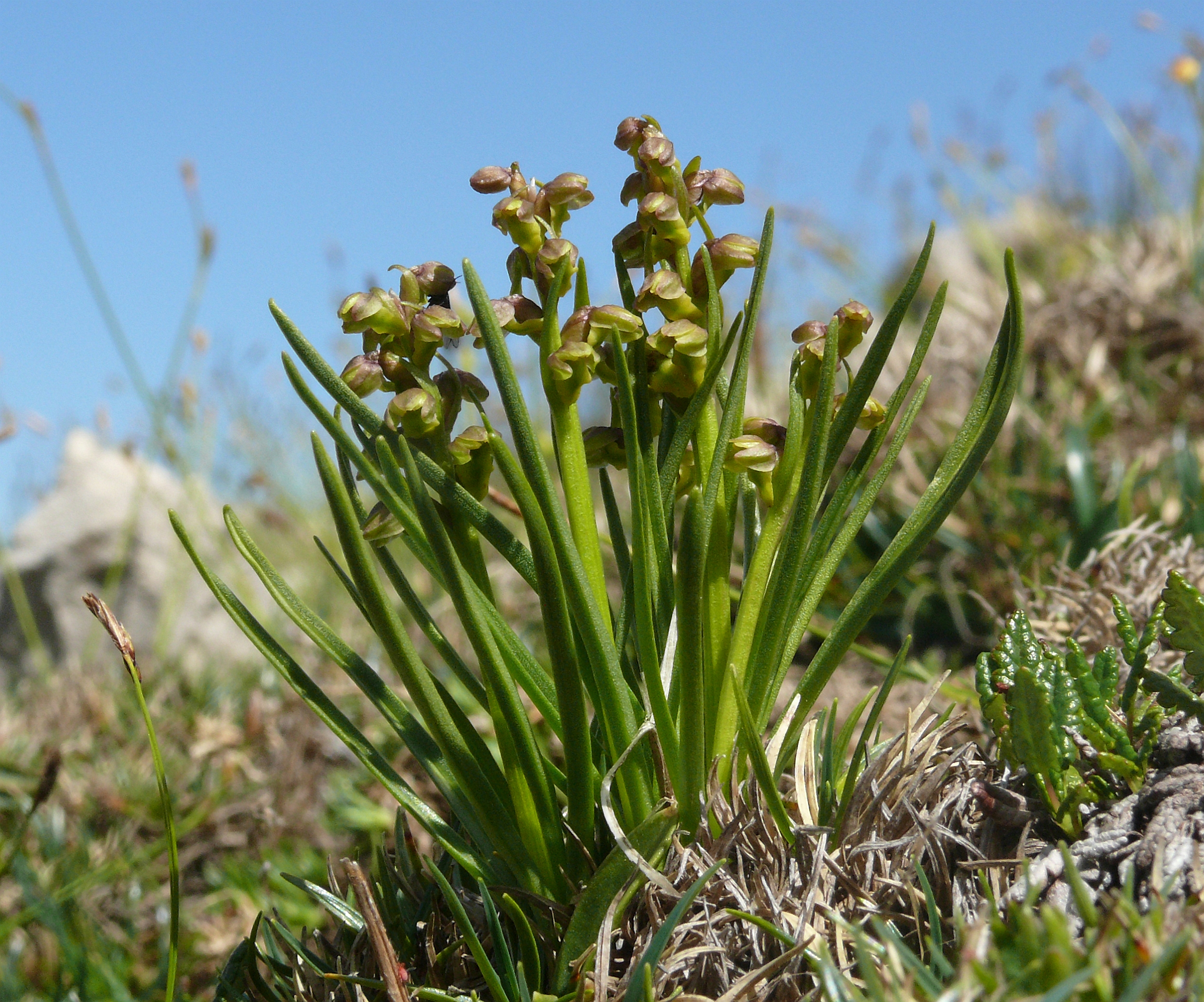

Scientific classification
- Kingdom: Plantae
- Clade: Tracheophytes
- Clade: Angiosperms
- Clade: Monocots
- Order: Asparagales
- Family: Orchidaceae
- Subfamily: Orchidoideae
- Tribe: Orchideae
- Subtribe: Orchidinae
- Genus: Chamorchis; Rich.
- Species: C. alpina

Binomial name
- Chamorchis alpina (L.) Rich

Synonyms
- Chamaerepes Spreng; Ophrys alpina L.; Orchis alpina (L.) Scop.; Epipactis alpina (L.) Schrank; Arachnites alpinus (L.) F.W.Schmidt; Satyrium alpinum (L.) Pers.; Chamaerepes alpina (L.) Spreng; Herminium alpinum (L.) Sweet; Herminium alpinum (L.) Lindl.; Aceras alpinum (L.) Steud.; Orchis graminea Crantz

= Chamorchis =

Genus of flowering plants

Chamorchis is a genus of flowering plants from the orchid family, Orchidaceae. It contains only one known species, Chamorchis alpina, known as the alpine dwarf orchid, false orchid or false musk orchid, and found in subarctic and subalpine parts of Europe: Scandinavia, the Alps, the Carpathians, northern European Russia.

== See also ==
- List of Orchidaceae genera
