= Genera Plantarum (disambiguation) =

Genera Plantarum is a 1737 publication of Swedish naturalist Carl Linnaeus.

Genera Plantarum may also refer to:

- Genera Plantarum Guineensium, an 1804 publication by Adam Afzelius
- Genera Plantarum Umbelliferarum, an 1814 publication by George Franz Hoffmann in Moscow
- A 3-volume series by George Bentham and Joseph Dalton Hooker, published between 1862 and 1883
- Genera plantarum, an 1831–1841 book by Stephan Endlicher
- Genera plantarum, a 1789 publication by Antoine Laurent de Jussieu
- Genera Plantarum Florae Germanicae, an 1830–1961 publication by Christian Gottfried Daniel Nees von Esenbeck
- Genera Plantarum Venezuelensium, a 1939 book by Henri François Pittier
