= Affinity (taxonomy) =

Term in taxonomy

Affinity (taxonomy) – mainly in life sciences or natural history – refers to resemblance suggesting a common descent, phylogenetic relationship, or type. The term does, however, have broader application, such as in geology (for example, in descriptive and theoretical works), and similarly in astronomy (for example, see "Centaur object" in the context of 2060 Chiron's close affinity with icy comet nuclei.)

== Basis ==
In taxonomy the basis of any particular type of classification is the way in which objects in the domain resemble each other. A resemblance of a type that seems appropriate to the classification that we propose, we may call an affinity, and when we decide how to classify say, a specimen of rock or butterfly, we justify our decision according to the affinities that we observe.

Other resemblances we dismiss as being out of context or at least non-cogent; for example, in deciding whether to classify a lizard as having closer affinities to a snake than to a table, biologists rely on affinities such as the scales, blood, physiology, vertebral anatomy, and reproductive system as being more relevant than the possession of four "feet".

== Application and obstacles ==
Analysing and determining the proper classification of an organism, a rock, or an astronomical object according to a particular system is often a difficult and treacherous procedure. Problems in such fields of study have tripped up whole generations of workers in recent centuries. When the position is not clear from an early stage, the first step after beginning to determine, evaluate, and describe the attributes of the object, is to determine the affinities and evaluate their significance.

The number of legs might well be a significant affinity in comparing different types of related organisms such as crustaceans, but irrelevant in comparing a ten-limbed cephalopod with a ten-limbed solifugid (including its pedipalps as limbs). Such a comparison would be no more cogent than the foregoing example of the lizard and the table.

There are many such examples in nature; we see both a lungfish and a porpoise as having closer (but largely different) affinities to a cow than to a tuna, and a bat as having closer affinities to a banteng than to a bird or a butterfly, although a banteng has no "wings". These are considerations arising from the principles discussed in articles on Homology (biology) and Analogy (biology).

It is clear that there is an element of subjectivity to the recognition of affinities; that is implicit in such dictionary definitions as: ""Affinity: the closeness of relation between plants as shown by similarity of important organs." That definition is over a century old, but it is typical of the basis on which taxonomists had to work until recently, and in practice still must use; it is not practical to sequence the genome of every specimen. Nucleic acid analyses are eroding many difficulties, but there is a long way to go.
