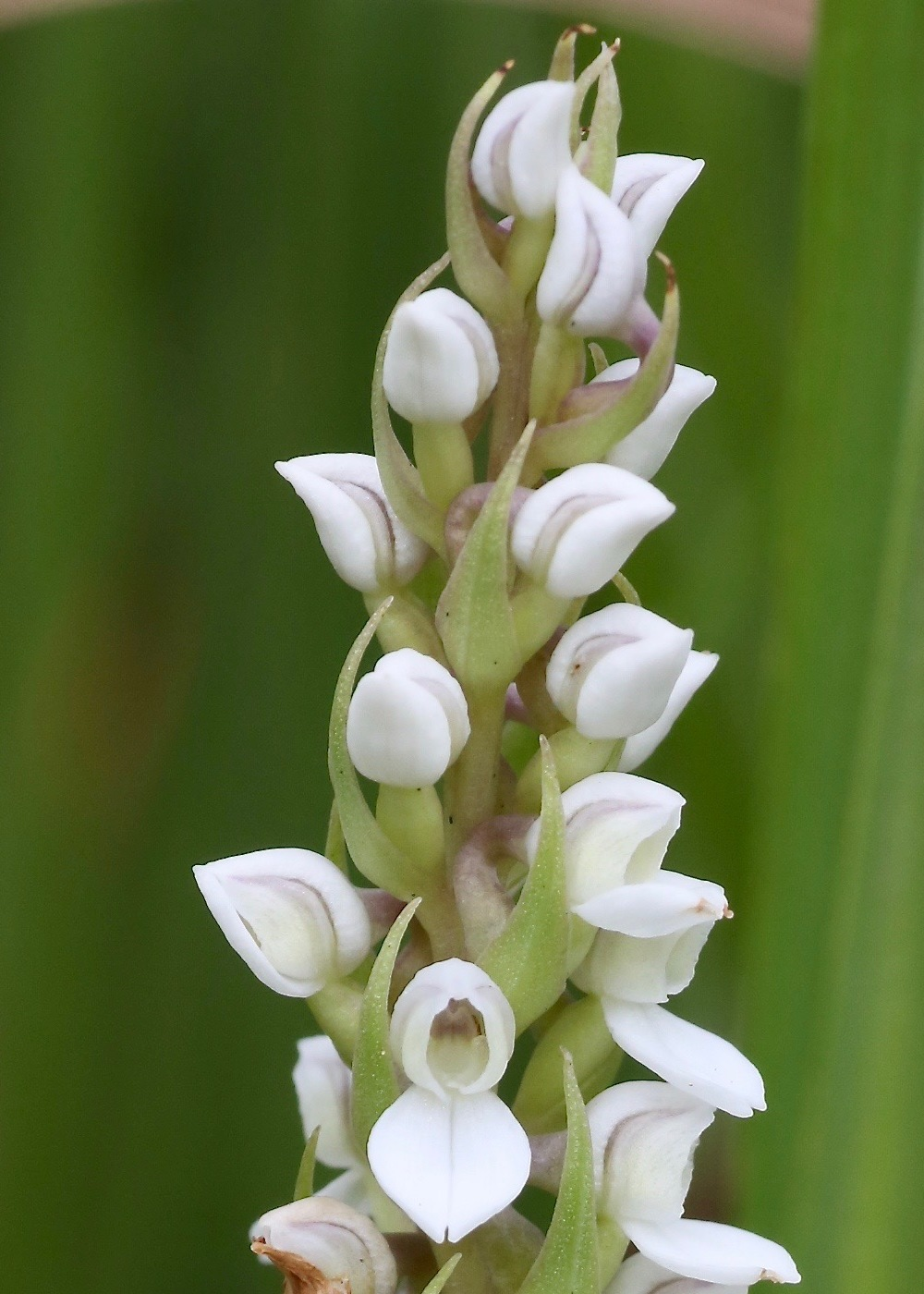
- Brownleea parviflora

Scientific classification
- Kingdom: Plantae
- Clade: Tracheophytes
- Clade: Angiosperms
- Clade: Monocots
- Order: Asparagales
- Family: Orchidaceae
- Subfamily: Orchidoideae
- Tribe: Orchideae
- Subtribe: Brownleeinae; H.P.Linder & Kurzweil

Genera
- Brownleea; Disperis

= Brownleeinae =

Subtribe of plants

Brownleeinae is an orchid subtribe in the tribe Orchideae.
