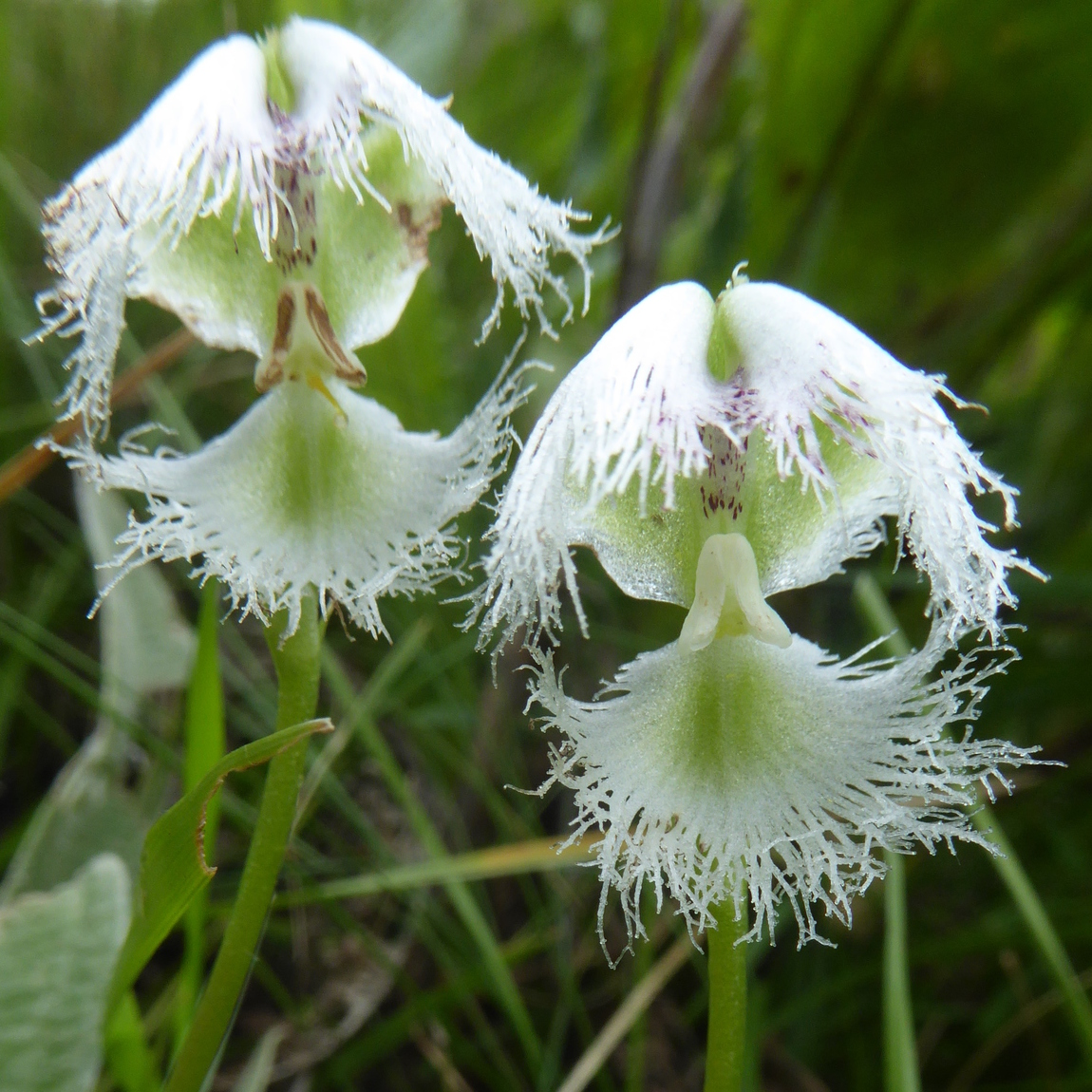
- Huttonaea grandiflora
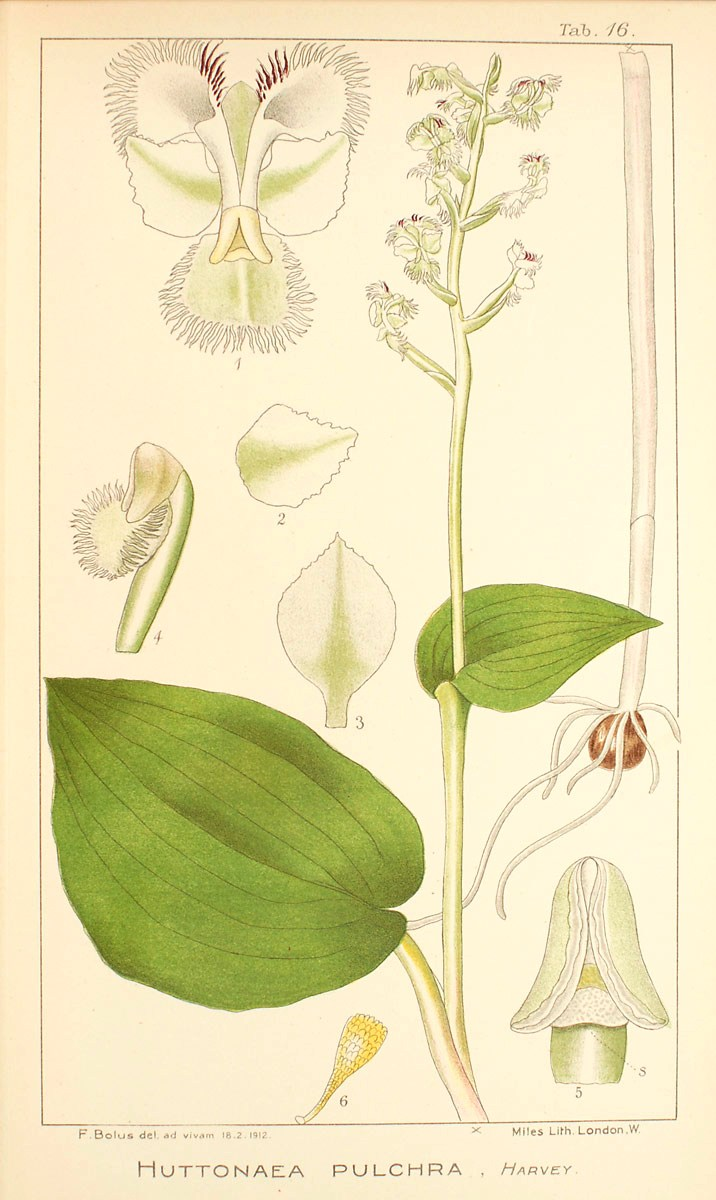
- Botanical illustration of Huttonaea pulchra

Scientific classification
- Kingdom: Plantae
- Clade: Tracheophytes
- Clade: Angiosperms
- Clade: Monocots
- Order: Asparagales
- Family: Orchidaceae
- Subfamily: Orchidoideae
- Tribe: Orchideae
- Subtribe: Huttonaeinae; Schltr.
- Genus: Huttonaea; Harv.

Synonyms
- Hallackia Harv. Huttonia Bolus

= Huttonaea =

Genus of flowering plants in the orchid family

Huttonaea is a genus of flowering plants from the orchid family, Orchidaceae. It contains 5 known species, all native to southern Africa (South Africa and Lesotho). This genus was named in honour of Caroline Hutton née Atherstone.

Species	Image
Huttonaea fimbriata (Harv.) Rchb.f.	
Huttonaea grandiflora (Schltr.) Rolfe in W.H.Harvey	
Huttonaea oreophila Schltr.	
Huttonaea pulchra Harv.	
Huttonaea woodii Schltr.	
