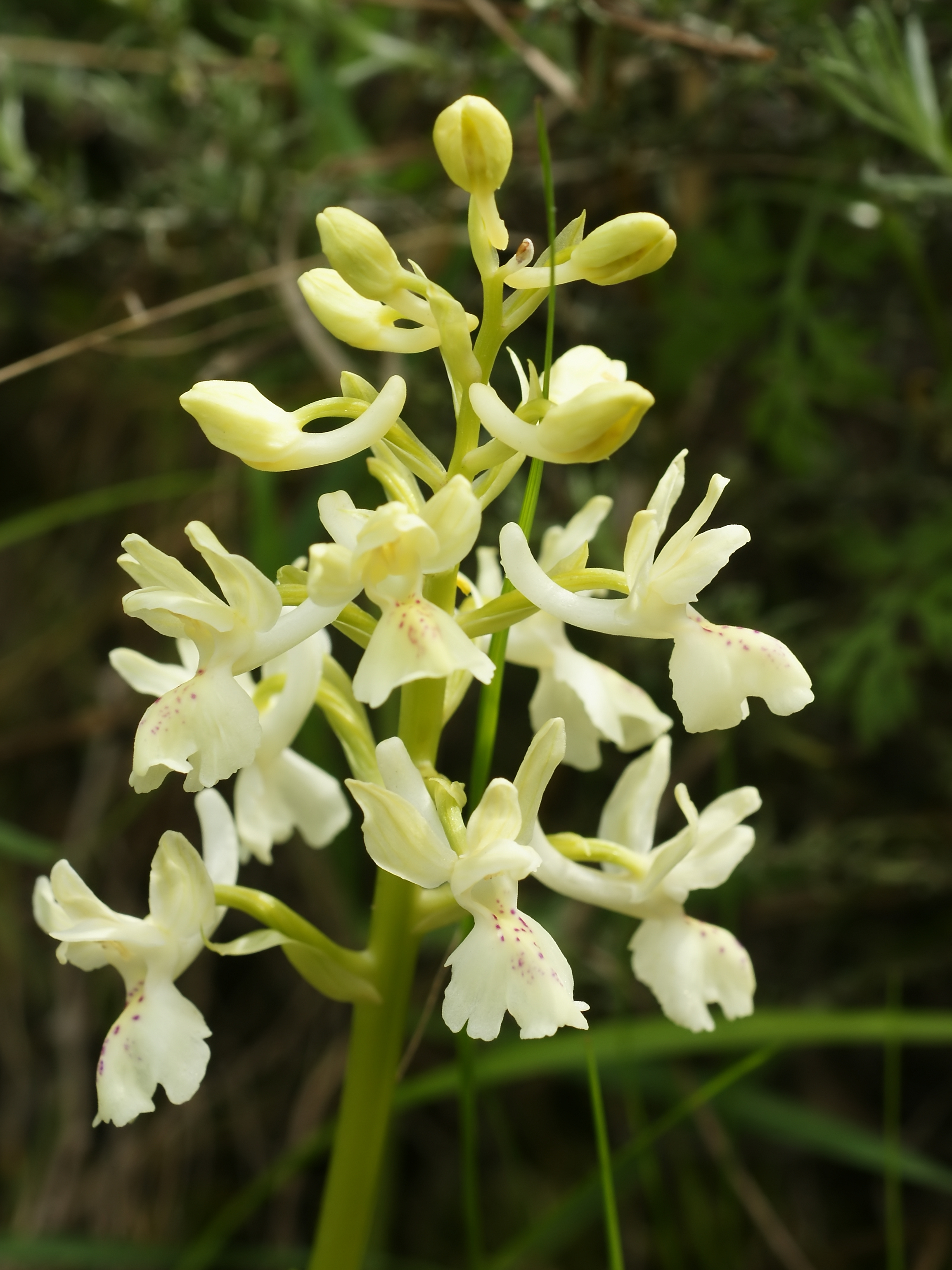
- Flower of Orchis provincialis

Scientific classification
- Kingdom: Plantae
- Clade: Tracheophytes
- Clade: Angiosperms
- Clade: Monocots
- Order: Asparagales
- Family: Orchidaceae
- Subfamily: Orchidoideae
- Tribe: Orchideae (Dressler & Dodson) Verm. (1977)

Subtribes
- Brownleeinae; Coryciinae; Disinae; Huttonaeinae; Orchidinae; Pachitinae

= Orchideae =

Tribe of orchids

Orchideae is a tribe of orchids in the subfamily Orchidoideae. Historically, it was divided into 2 subtribes, Orchidinae and Habenariinae. The subtribe Orchidinae alone contains about 1,800 species. However, although some phylogenetic studies have established the monophyly of the subtribes, the generic boundaries are unclear, with many genera as traditionally circumscribed being paraphyletic or even polyphyletic. Species of genera such as Habenaria and Platanthera have been placed into both subtribes. A 2017 molecular phylogenetic study found that both subtribes did form clades, but did not formally recognize Habenariinae, because of missing genera and uncertainty over generic boundaries. The Asian species of Orchideae, in particular, have been subject to repeated changes of generic placement from 2012 onwards.

As of 2017, Orchideae is divided into 6 subtribes: Brownleeinae, Pachitinae, Huttonaeinae, Orchidinae, Coryciinae, and Disinae.

== Subtribes ==
Once divided into the Orchidinae and Habenariinae (a nonsystematic paraphyletic splitting), the Orchideae now comprise 6 subtribes. Along with previous molecular studies, Chase et al's 2015 analysis confirmed that Diseae was a polyphyletic grouping. Consequently, the former subtribes of Diseae have been redistributed within the Orchideae (for instance, Satyrium is now classified in the Orchidinae). In his 2015 study Chase recommended further study of historically problematic genera in the former Diseae such as Huttonaea and Pachites. Further molecular analysis by Chen et al. in 2017 led to the following reorganization:

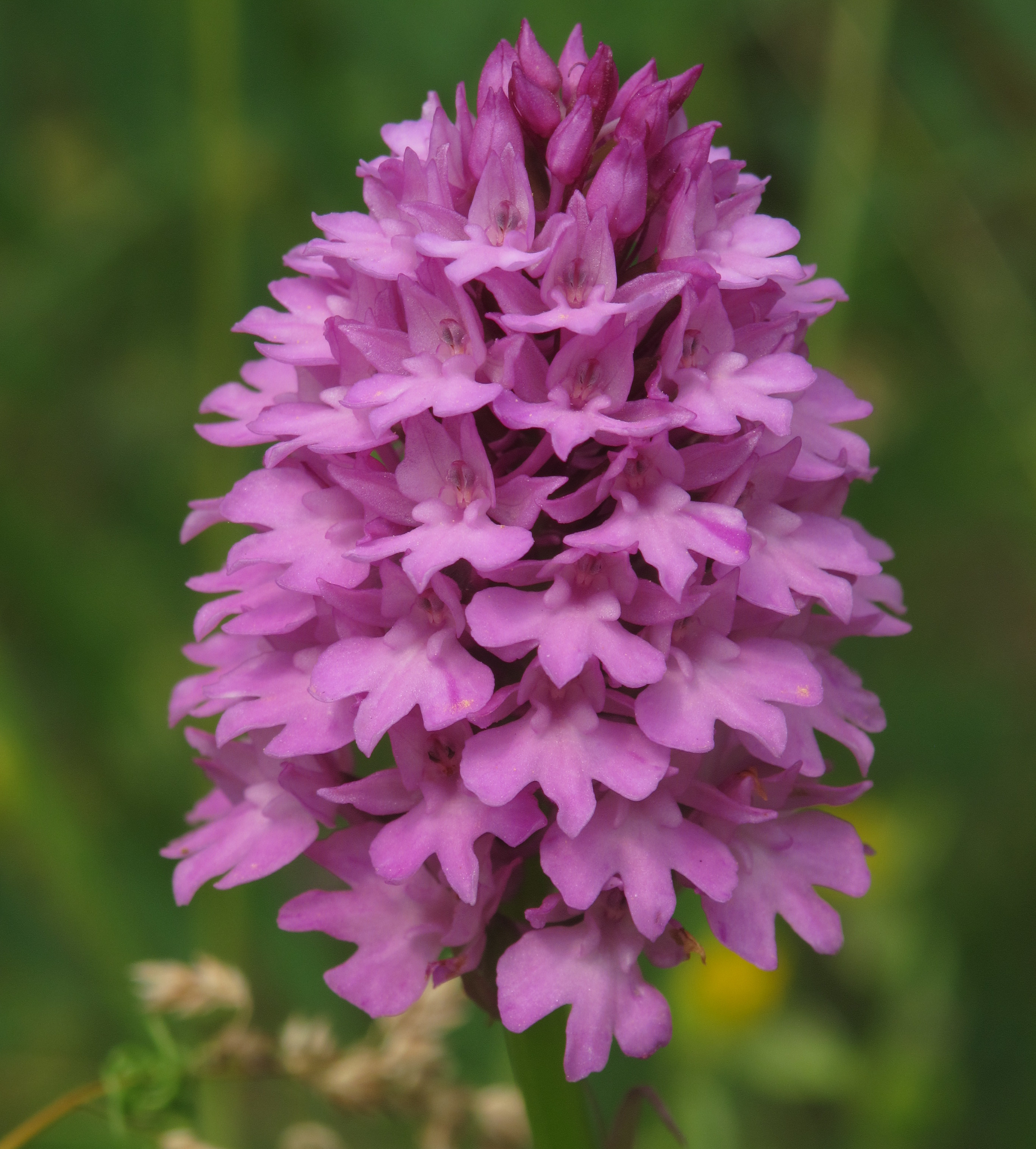
Anacamptis pyramidalis

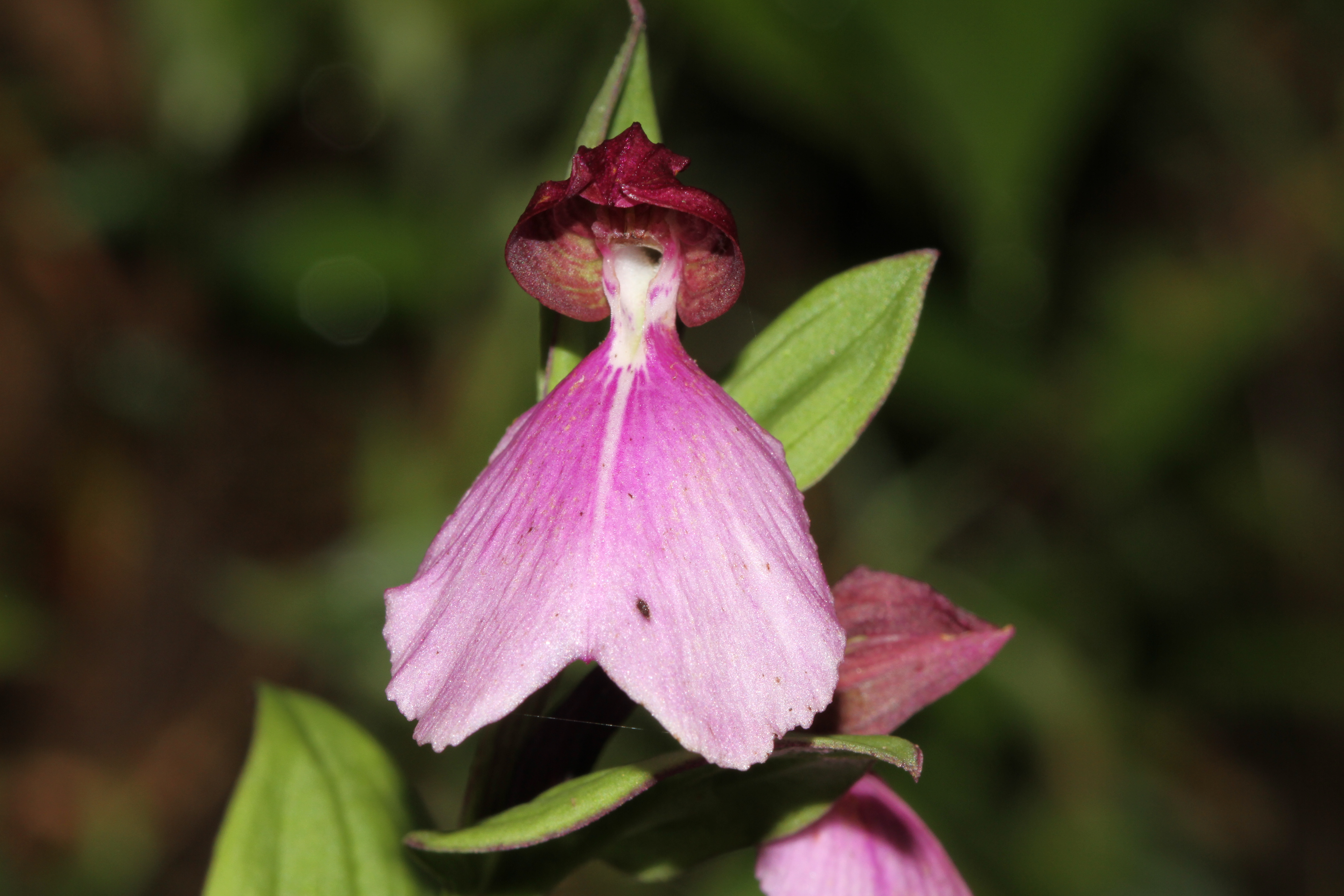
Brachycorythis, a member of the Orchidinae

- Orchideae
  - Brownleeinae
  - - Pachitinae
    - - Huttonaeinae
      - - Orchidinae
        - - Coryciinae
          - Disinae

== Genera ==
Genera included in a 2017 molecular phylogenetic study are listed below. As noted above, some generic boundaries remain uncertain; Habenaria in particular is not monophyletic.

- Anacamptis
- Benthamia
- Bonatea
- Brachycorythis
- Chamorchis
- Cynorkis
- Dactylorhiza
- Diplomeris
- Galearis s.l. (including Aceratorchis, Amerorchis and Neolindleya)
- Gennaria
- Gymnadenia (including Nigritella)
- Habenaria (not monophyletic)
- Hemipilia (including a few species previously assigned to Amitostigma and Ponerorchis)
- Herminium
- Himantoglossum
- Hsenhsua
- Neotinea
- Ophrys
- Orchis s.s.
- Pecteilis
- Peristylus
- Physoceras
- Platanthera s.l.
- Ponerorchis s.l. (including Amitostigma and Neottianthe)
- Pseudorchis
- Satyrium
- Schizochilus
- Serapias
- Shizhenia
- Sirindhornia
- Stenoglottis
- Steveniella
- Silvorchis
- Traunsteinera
- Tsaiorchis
- Tylostigma

== See also ==
- Taxonomy of the Orchidaceae
