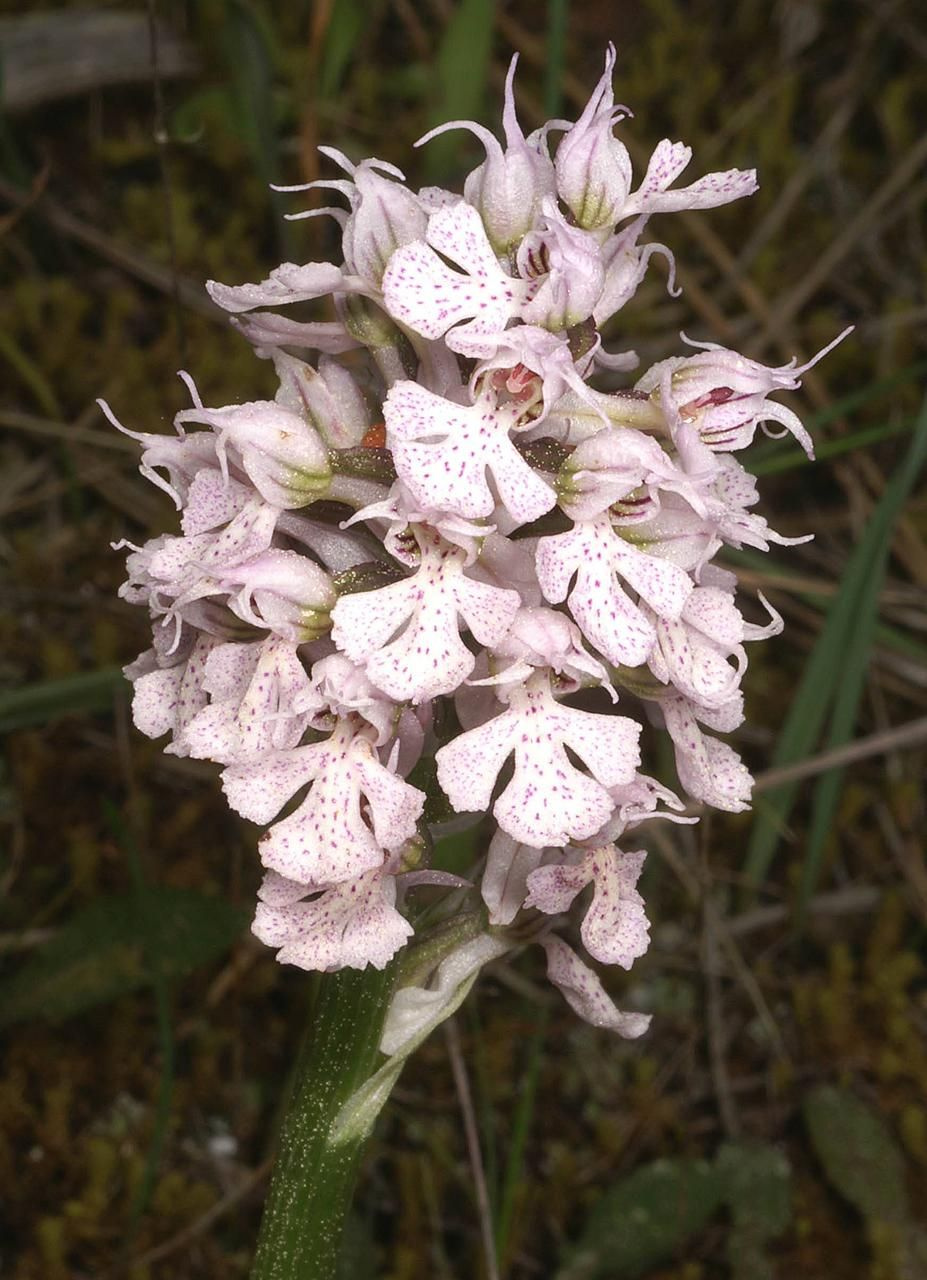
- Neotinea tridentata subsp. commutata

Scientific classification
- Kingdom: Plantae
- Clade: Tracheophytes
- Clade: Angiosperms
- Clade: Monocots
- Order: Asparagales
- Family: Orchidaceae
- Subfamily: Orchidoideae

Tribes
- See text

= Orchidoideae =

Subfamily of orchids

The Orchidoideae, or the orchidoid orchids, are a subfamily of the orchid family (Orchidaceae) that contains around 3630 species. Species typically have a single (monandrous), fertile anther which is erect and basitonic.

== Description ==
The subfamily Orchidoideae and the previously recognized subfamily Spiranthoideae are considered the closest allies in the natural group of the monandrous orchids because of several generally shared characters:

- a shared terrestrial habit
- sectile (capable of being severed) or granular pollinia
- erect anthers.

== Taxonomy ==
Phylogeny of the Orchidoideae is volatile and still subject to change. Historically, the Orchidoideae have been partitioned into up to 6 tribes, including Orchideae, Diseae, Cranichideae, Chloraeeae, Diurideae, and Codonorchideae. However, the most recent molecular phylogenetics analysis led by Chase et al. in 2015 and subsequently by Chen et al. in 2017 indicates that the Orchidoideae should be split into 4 tribes: the Orchideae, Cranichideae, Diurideae, and Codonorchideae.

=== Codonorchideae ===
This monophyletic tribe consists of only one genus, Codonorchis, found in South America.

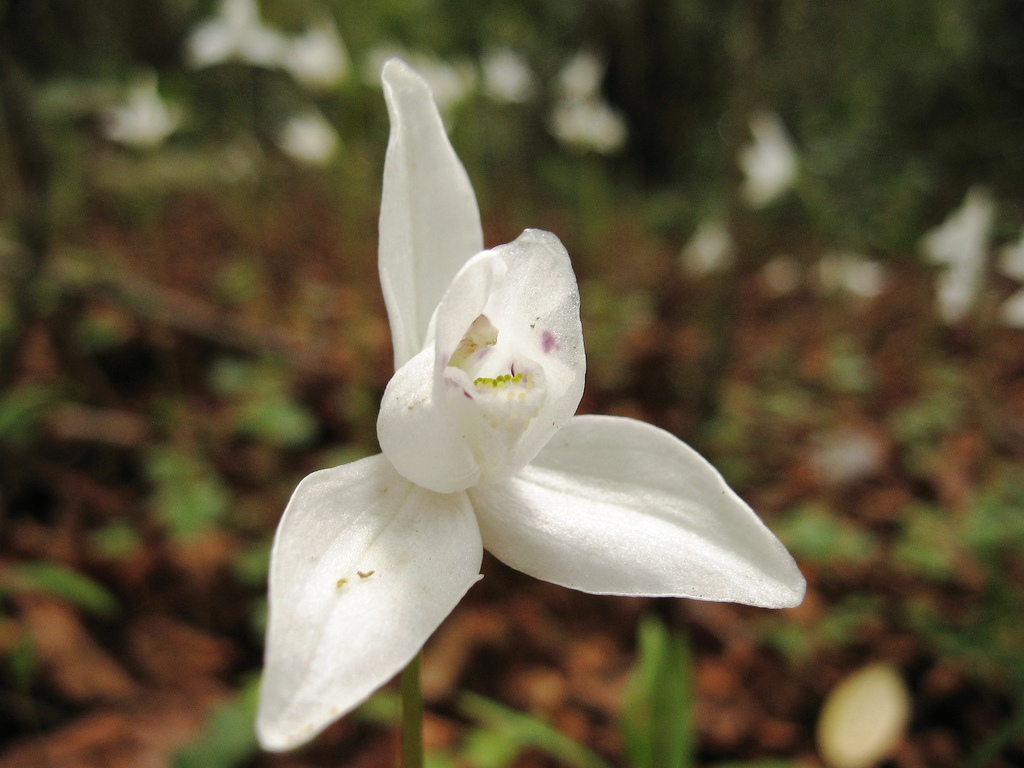
Codonorchis lessonii, native to Chile

=== Cranichideae ===
This cosmopolitan tribe comprises 8 currently accepted subtribes. Molecular evidence suggests that the former Chloraeeae are sister to the rest of the Cranichideae. As such, the Chloraeeae are now considered a subtribe of the Cranichideae. Moreover, based on morphological and genetic evidence, the genus Discyphus was elevated out of the Spiranthinae to form its own monophyletic subtribe, the Discyphinae.

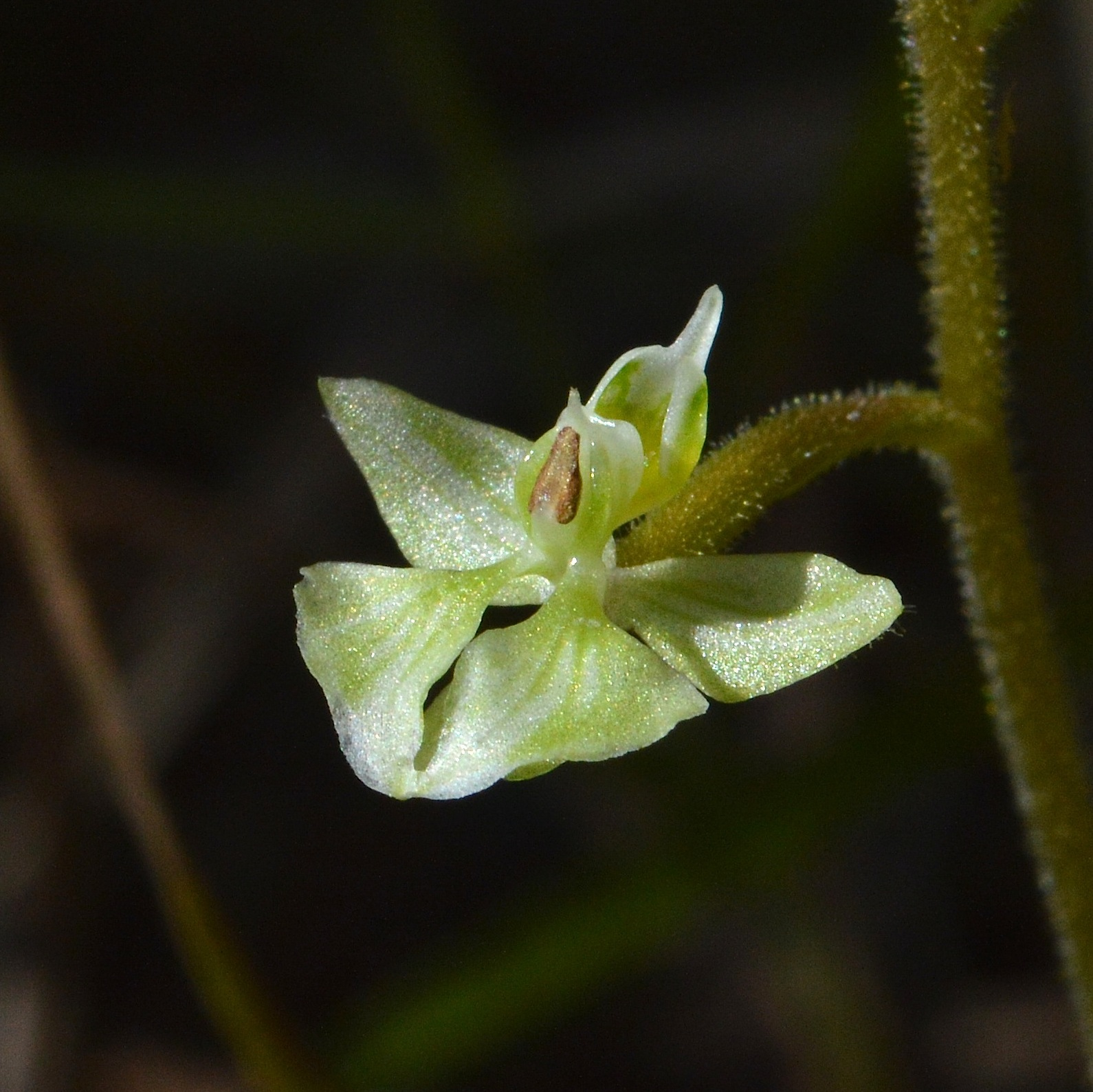
Ponthieva racemosa, a member of the Cranichidinae

- Cranichideae
  - Chloraeinae
  - - Pterostylidinae
    - - Goodyerinae
      - - Galeottiellinae
        - - Manniellinae
          - - Spiranthinae
            - - Discyphinae
              - Cranichidinae

=== Orchideae ===
Once divided into the Orchidinae and Habenariinae (a nonsystematic paraphyletic splitting), the Orchideae now comprise 6 subtribes. Along with previous molecular studies, Chase et al's 2015 analysis confirmed that Diseae was a polyphyletic grouping. Consequently, the former subtribes of Diseae have been redistributed within the Orchideae (for instance, Satyrium is now classified in the Orchidinae). In his 2015 study Chase recommended further study of historically problematic genera in the former Diseae such as Huttonaea and Pachites. Further molecular analysis by Chen et al. in 2017 led to the following reorganization:

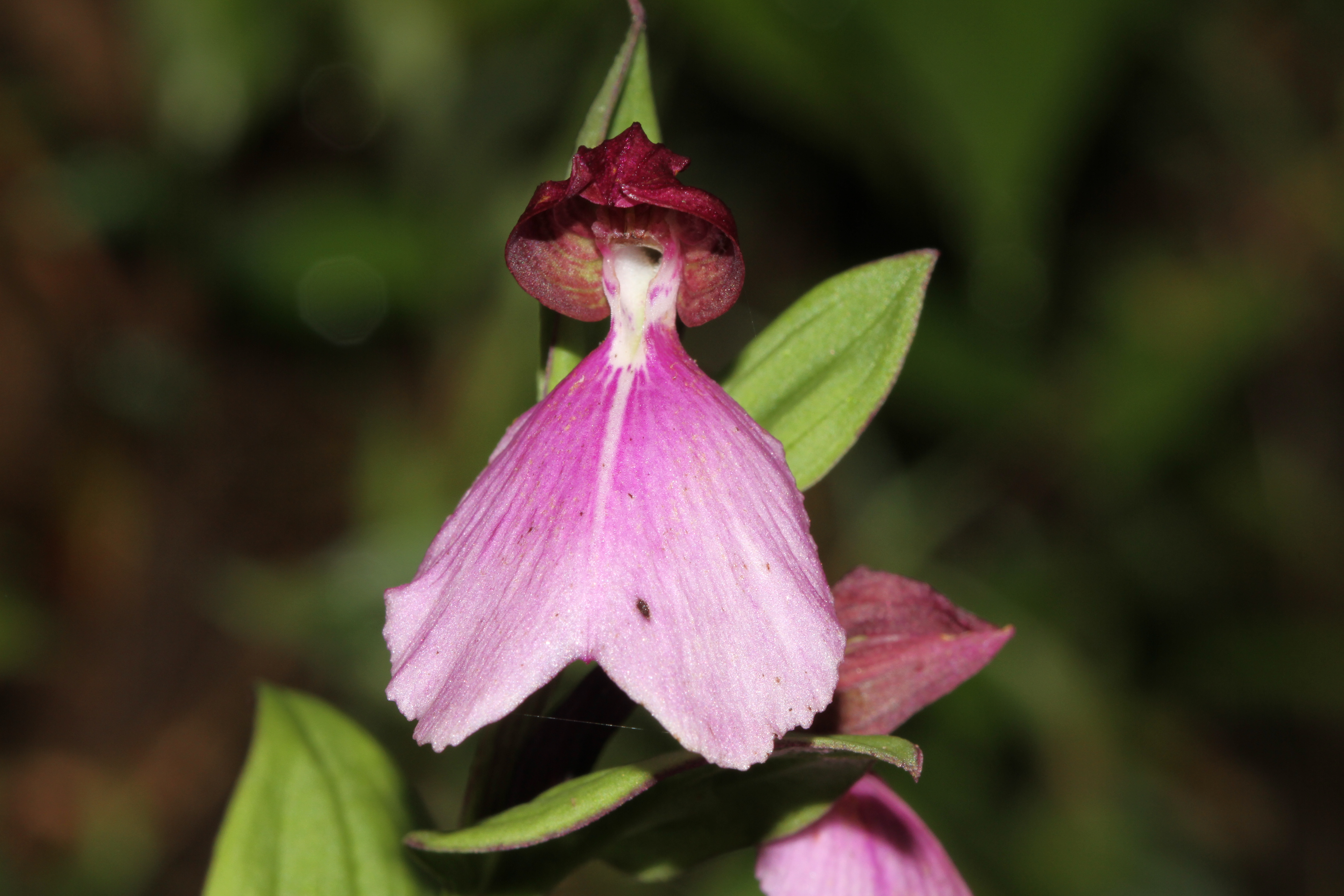
Brachycorythis, a member of the Orchidinae

- Orchideae
  - Brownleeinae
  - - Pachitinae
    - - Huttonaeinae
      - - Orchidinae
        - - Coryciinae
          - Disinae

=== Diurideae ===
The Diurideae, a predominantly Australasian tribe, retain their previous subtribal organization and comprise 9 taxa:

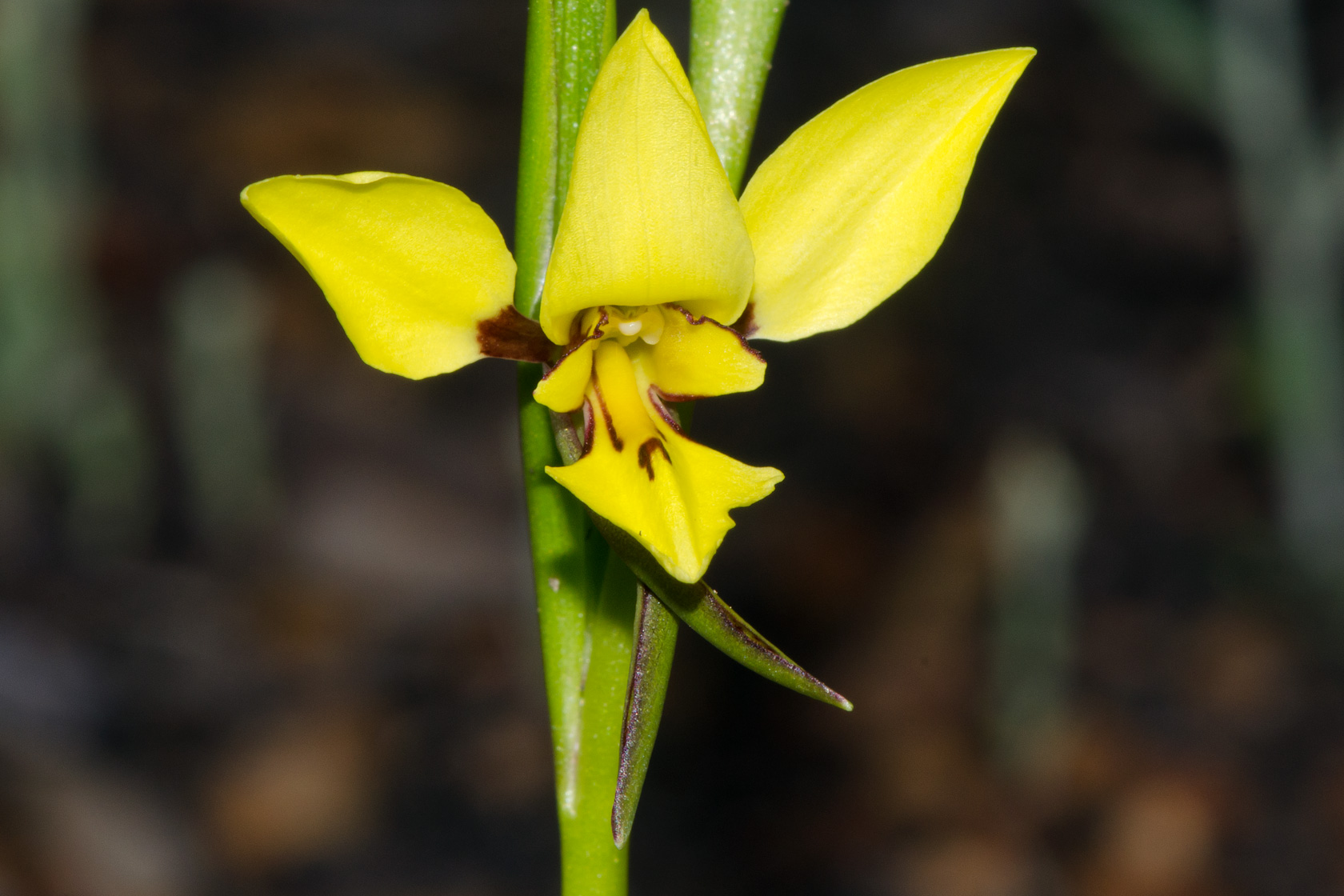
Diuris setacea, a member of the Diuridinae

- Acianthinae (monophyletic)
- Caladeniinae (polyphyletic)
- Cryptostylidinae (monophyletic)
- Diuridinae (monophyletic)
- Drakaeinae (monophyletic)
- Megastylidinae (monophyletic)
- Prasophyllinae (monophyletic)
- Rhizanthellinae (monophyletic)
- Thelymitrinae (monophyletic)
