= Pouyannian mimicry =

Evolutionary strategy

Pouyannian mimicry

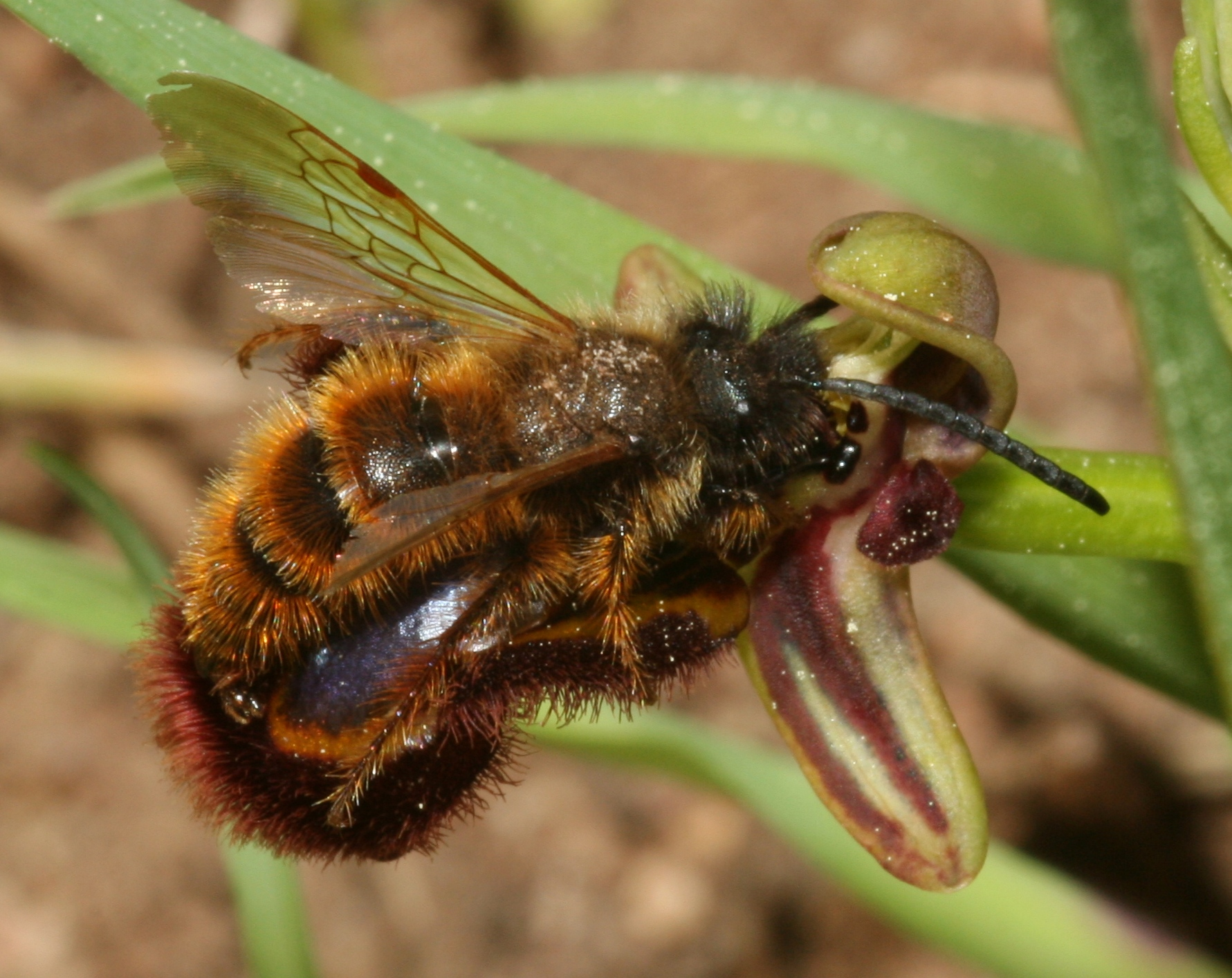
Dupe: Dasyscolia ciliata, a scoliid wasp, attempting to copulate with a flower of the orchid Ophrys speculum

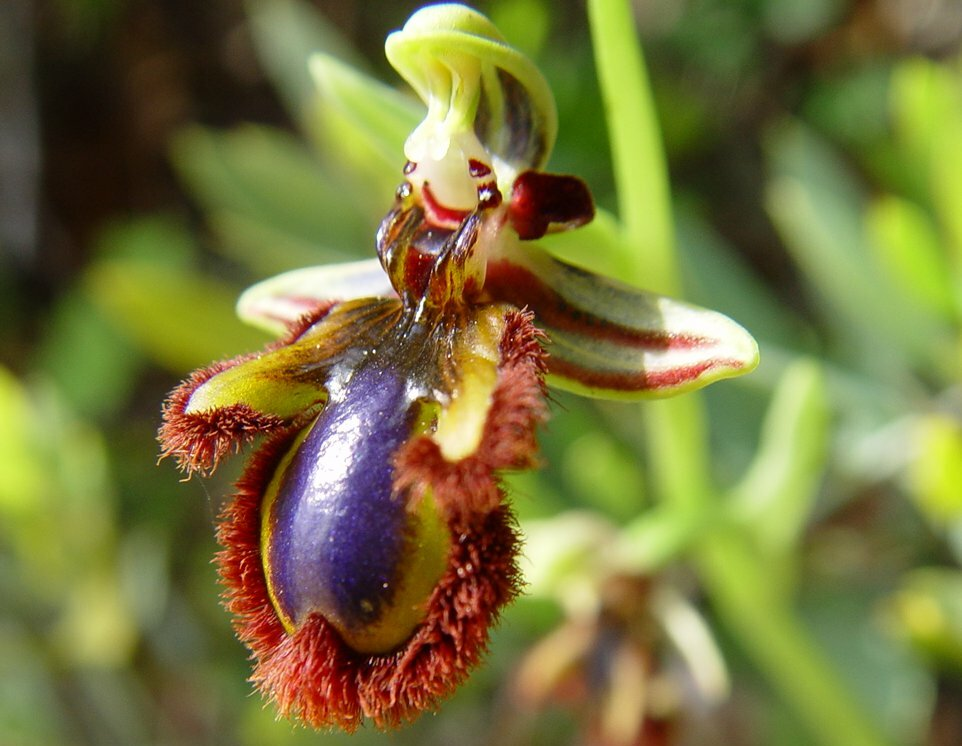
Mimic: Ophrys speculum, the mirror bee orchid

Pouyannian mimicry is a form of mimicry in plants that deceives an insect into attempting to copulate with a flower. The flower mimics a potential female mate of a male insect, which then serves the plant as a pollinator. The mechanism is named after the French lawyer and amateur botanist Maurice-Alexandre Pouyanne. The resemblance that he noted is visual, but the key stimuli that deceive the pollinator are often chemical and tactile.

In orchids, the resemblance is to a species of bee; Pouyanne observed the bee Dasyscolia ciliata pollinating the orchid Ophrys speculum. The flower uses morphology, coloration, and scent to deceive the pollinator. The chemicals secreted from the flower's osmophore glands are indistinguishable from the insect's pheromones. The pollinator is not rewarded with nectar, and may waste significant amounts of sperm while trying to mate with the flower.

== Definition ==
The form of mimicry in plants that deceives an insect into pseudocopulation is called Pouyannian mimicry after the French lawyer and amateur botanist Maurice-Alexandre Pouyanne.

Mimicry typically involves three species, namely a mimic, a model, and a dupe, as seen for example in Batesian mimicry. Floral mimicry involves the imitation of other plants or animals, including of coloration, morphology, egg deposition sites, provoking scents, and mating signals. In the case of Pouyannian mimicry, the model and the dupe are the female and male of the same species, so the mimicry is bipolar, involving only two species, an insect and a flower.

Pouyannian mimicry with pseudocopulation, compared to Batesian mimicry. Pouyannian mimicry is bipolar, with only 2 species involved, as the dupe and the model are of the same species, such as a pollinating bee.

== History ==
In 1916, Pouyanne, with the Swiss botanist Henry Correvon, described his observations in Algeria:

Pouyanne 1916	Translation
Asseyez-vous, en effet, au soleil, un petit bouquet d' Ophrys speculum à la main, sur un talus au-dessus duquel les mâles de Dasyscolia ciliata exécutent leurs évolutions. Vous ne tardez pas à vous apercevoir qu’ils ont flairé, en quelque sorte, qu’ils ont repéré les fleurs que vous tenez ... Il se pose alors sur le labelle, de manière que sa tête arrive tout près du stigmate, juste sous les pollinies, et que son abdomen plonge, à l’extrémité, dans les poils longs, fauves et épais qui forment comme une couronne barbue au labelle. Le bout de l'abdomen est alors agité, contre ces poils, de mouvements désordonnés, presque convulsifs, et l'insecte tout entier se trémousse; ses mouvements, son attitude paraissent tout à fait semblables à ceux des insectes qui pratiquent des tentatives de copulation.	Sit down in the sun, with a small bouquet of Ophrys speculum in your hand, on a slope above which the males of Dasyscolia ciliata are performing their movements. You soon realize that they have scented, in some way, that they have detected the flowers you are holding [...] It then lands on the flower's labellum, so that its head is very close to the stigma, just under the pollinia, and its abdomen plunges, at the end, into the long, tawny and thick hairs which form a kind of bearded crown on the labellum. The tip of the abdomen is then agitated, against these hairs, with disordered, almost convulsive movements, and the entire insect wriggles; its movements, its attitude are like those of insects practising attempts at copulation.

== In orchids ==
Several orchids (Orchidaceae) make use of floral mimicry. Using sex-based deception, these species imitate female mating signals of certain pollinator species. This results in attempted copulation by males of the pollinator species, facilitating pollen transfer. Bee orchids (Ophrys apifera) and fly orchids (Ophrys insectifera), specifically, utilize flower morphology, coloration, and scent to deceive their respective pollinators. These orchids have evolved traits matching the preferences of specific pollinator niches, leading to adaptive speciation.

The mimicry involves secreting chemicals from glands (osmophores) in the sepals, petals, or labellum, that are indistinguishable from the insect's natural pheromones. The flower attaches a pollinium to the pollinator's body; the insect transfers the pollinium to the stigma of another flower when it makes its next copulation attempt. Pollinators are often bees, wasps, or flies.

The cost to the pollinating insects might be seen as negligible, but pollinators of the Australian orchid Cryptostylis can waste significant amounts of sperm by ejaculating onto the flower. Thus there could be antagonistic coevolution such that pollinators become better at identifying their own species correctly, while orchids become better mimics.

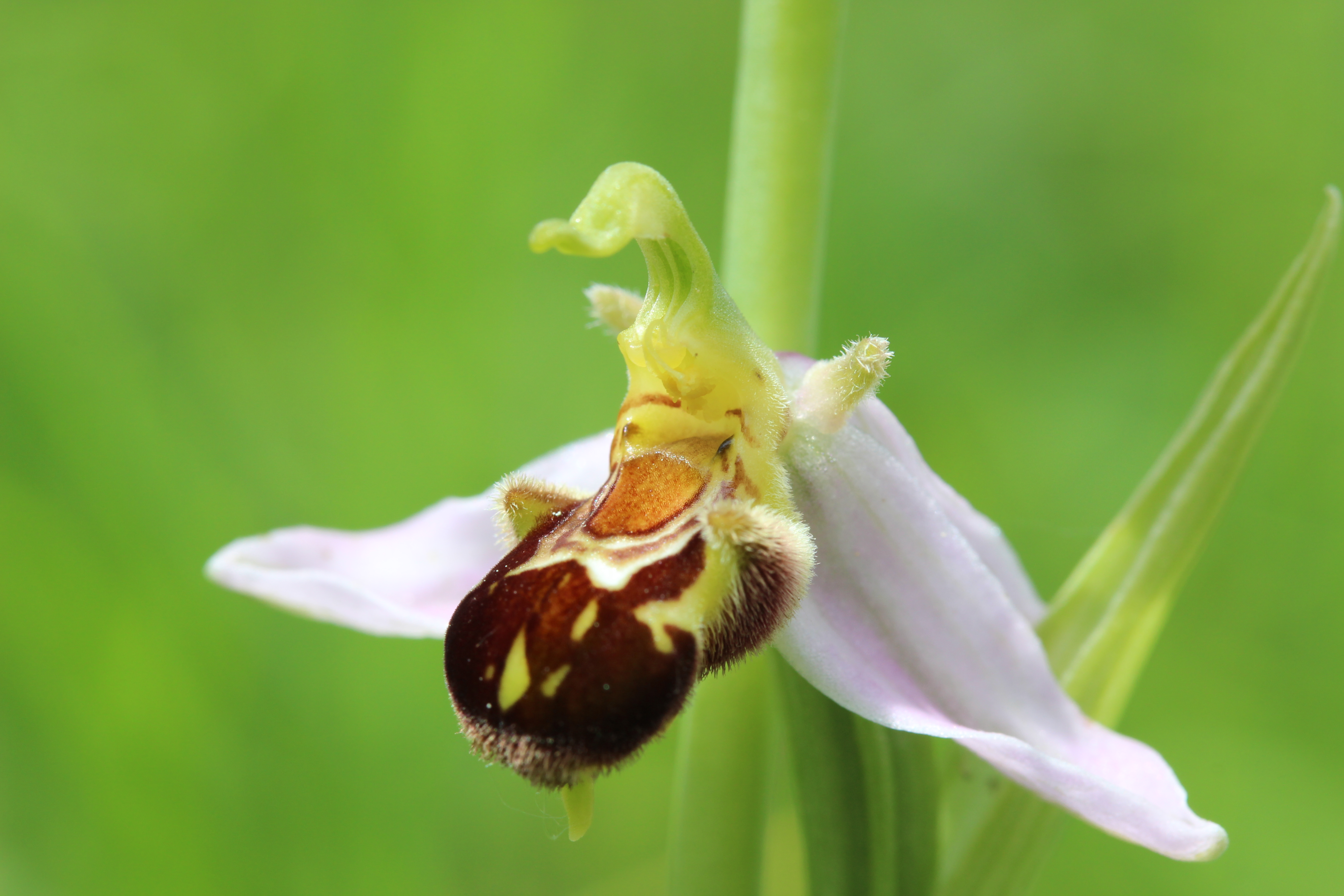
Mimic: flower of Bee Orchid, Ophrys apifera mimics a female bee to attract male bees as pollinators.

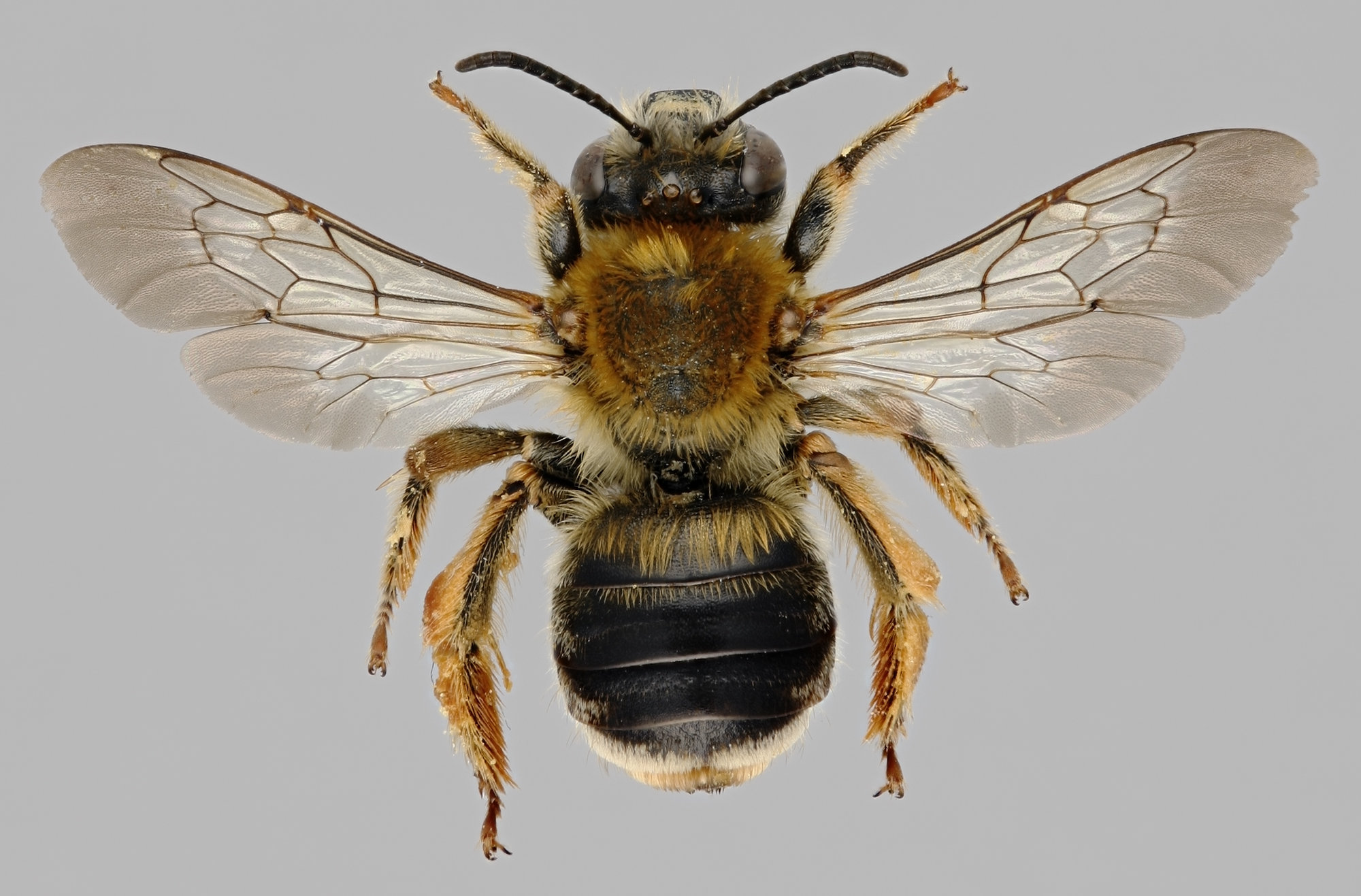
Model: Female longhorn bee, Eucera longicornis

One mechanism in pollination is to use incentives or rewards. These are beneficial offerings to a pollinator, enticing it to engage with the reward and thus transfer pollen. Flowering plants that do not produce such rewards can instead attract pollinators through mimicry — a form of convergent evolution. Such plants are called "deceptive plants" as they mimic the characteristics or rewards of other species without providing any benefit to the pollinator.

Although bee and fly orchids are visual mimics of their pollinators, visual traits are not the only (nor the most important) ones mimicked to increase attraction. Floral odours have been identified as the most prominent way of attracting pollinators, because these odours imitate the sex pheromones of females of the pollinator species. Male pollinators then track these scents over long distances. The proportions of such odour compounds have been found to be varied in different populations of orchids (in a variety of locations), playing a crucial role in attracting specific pollinators at the population level. The evolution of these interactions between plants and pollinators involves natural selection favoring local adaptation, leading to a more precise imitation of the scents produced by local pollinators.

Chemical compounds (more specifically, alkanes and alkenes), while used for sexual deception, are produced in many species of Ophrys, and likely were preadapted for other functions before being co-opted for mimicry. These orchids increased ancestral levels of alkene production to mimic the female pheromones that attract male pollinators, a form of sensory exploitation called a sensory trap.

Although mimetic plants typically receive fewer interactions with pollinators than truly-rewarding plants do, the evolution of sexual deception appears to be linked to benefits associated with mating behavior. Sex-based mimicry results in pollinator fidelity, the continued revisiting of flowers of the same species by a pollinator, as a result of sexual deception. In support of this, sex-based deception in an Australian orchid results in a higher proportion of pollen reaching stigmas than food-based deception. In another study, deception of male pollinators results in a long-distance dispersal of pollen.
