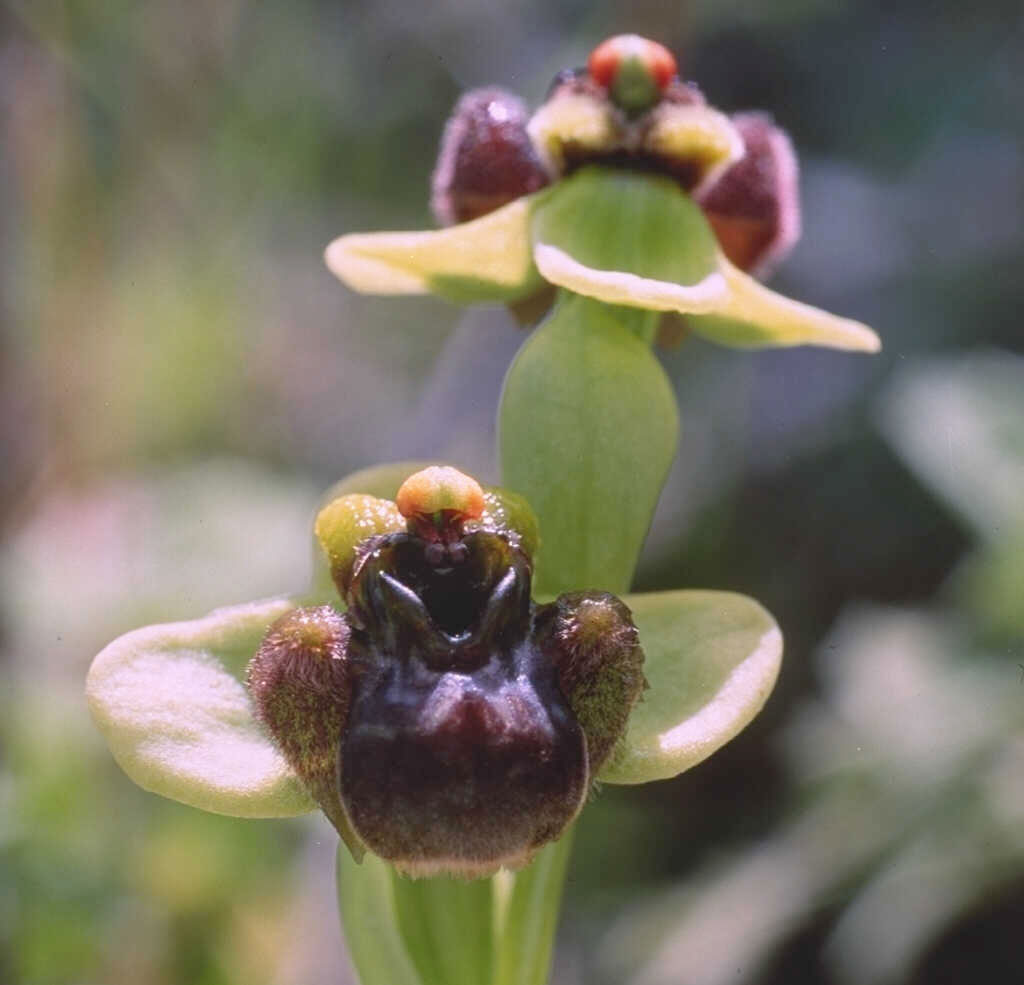

Conservation status
- CITES Appendix II

Scientific classification
- Kingdom: Plantae
- Clade: Tracheophytes
- Clade: Angiosperms
- Clade: Monocots
- Order: Asparagales
- Family: Orchidaceae
- Subfamily: Orchidoideae
- Genus: Ophrys
- Species: O. bombyliflora

Binomial name
- Ophrys bombyliflora Link

= Ophrys bombyliflora =

Bumblebee orchid

Species of orchid

Ophrys bombyliflora, the bumblebee orchid, is a species of Ophrys (bee orchid), native from the Mediterranean region from Portugal and the Canary Islands to Turkey and Lebanon. The genus name Ophrys is from the Greek in reference to the hairy lips of the flowers of this genus; the specific epithet bombyliflora is from the Greek bombylios (bumblebee) in reference to the appearance of the flowers of this species.

Ophrys bombyliflora is pollinated by males of solitary bees of the genus Eucera (which are not bumblebees). As with other species of Ophrys, the flowers mimic the females in appearance and scent. Earlier-emerging males attempt to mate with the flowers ("pseudocopulation"), collecting pollinia in the process which they transfer to other flowers of the same species.
