= Chemical communication in insects =

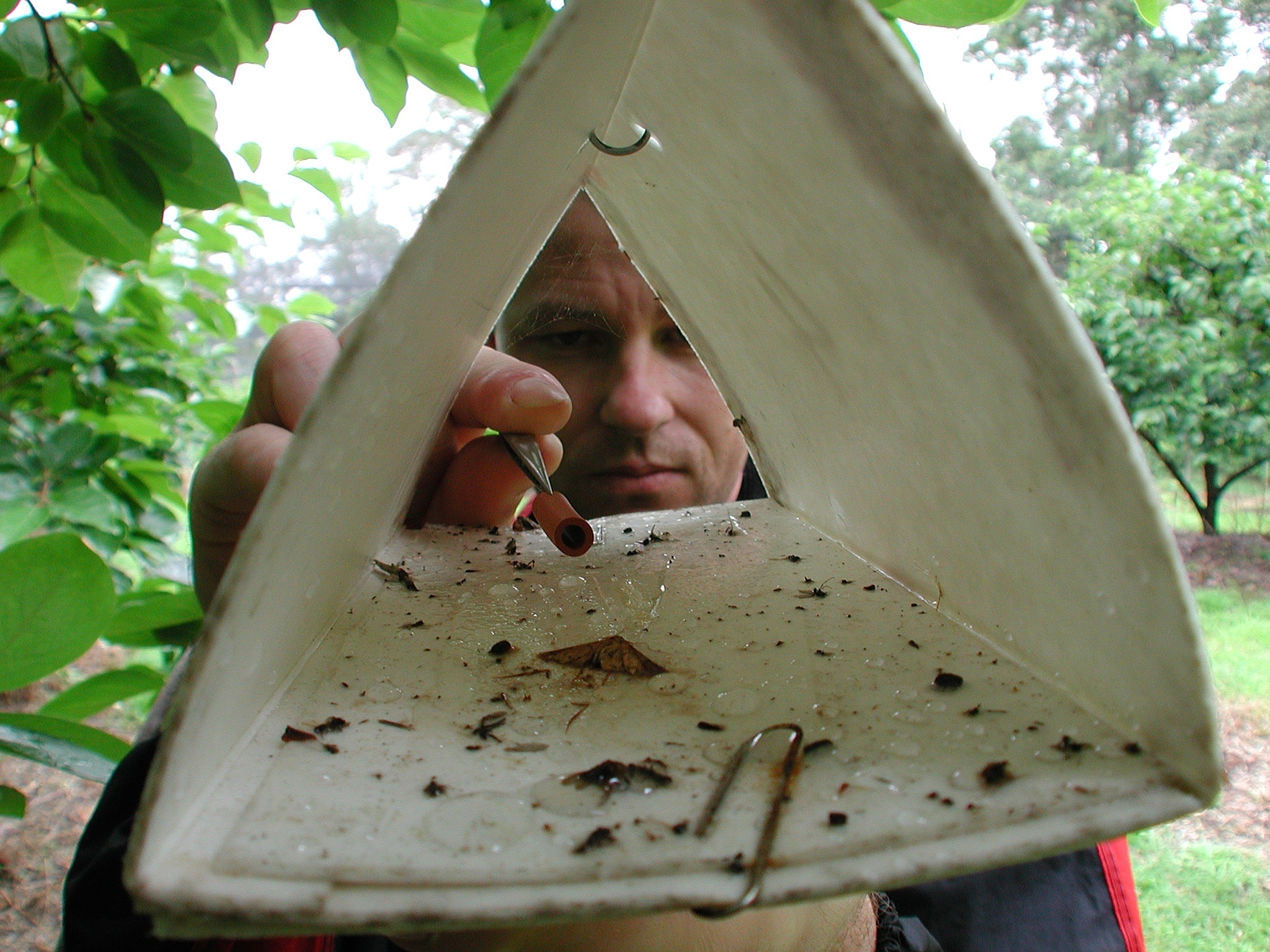
Pheromones can be used instead of insecticides in orchards. Pest insects are attracted by sex pheromones, allowing farmers to evaluate pest levels, and if need be to provide sufficient pheromone to disrupt mating.

Chemical communication in insects is social signalling between insects of the same or different species, using chemicals. These chemicals may be volatile, to be detected at a distance by other insects' sense of smell, or non-volatile, to be detected on an insect's cuticle by other insects' sense of taste. Many of these chemicals are pheromones, acting like hormones outside the body.

Among the many functions of chemical communication are attracting mates, aggregating conspecific individuals of both sexes, deterring other individuals from approaching, announcing a new food source, marking a trail, recognizing nest-mates, marking territory and triggering aggression.

Chemical communication within a species can be usurped by other species in chemical mimicry. The mimic produces allomones or pheromones to influence the behaviour of another insect, the dupe, to the mimic's advantage. The process is important in ant mimicry where species that do not look like ants are accepted into the ant colony.

== History of research ==
In 1960, Dethier, Brown, and Smith categorised chemical signals into six groups.

Chemical signals by the behaviour they induce (Dethier, Brown, and Smith 1960)
Category	Resulting behaviour
Locomotory stimulant	Makes insects disperse, such as by speeding up their movements or slowing down their turning rate
Arrestant	Makes insects aggregate by contact, such as by slowing their movements or speeding up their turning rate
Attractant	Makes insects move towards the source
Repellent	Makes insects move away from the source
Feeding, mating, or ovipositional stimulant	Encourages feeding, mating, or oviposition
Deterrent	Inhibits feeding or oviposition

In 1965, the entomologist Edward O. Wilson published a paper on chemical communication in the social insects, arguing that their societies were principally organised by "complex systems of chemical signals". By 1990, Mahmoud Ali and David Morgan noted that the field had grown too large to review comprehensively.

== Semiochemicals ==
In addition to the use of means such as making sounds, generating light, and touch for communication, a wide range of insects have evolved chemical signals, semiochemicals. Types of semiochemicals include pheromones and kairomones. Chemoreception is the physiological response of a sense organ to a chemical stimulus where the chemicals act as signals to regulate the state or activity of a cell.

Semiochemicals are often derived from plant metabolites. They can be grouped by which individuals they act upon:

- Pheromones serve communication between insects of the same species.
- Allomones benefit their producer by the effect they have upon the receiver.
- Kairomones benefit their receiver instead of their producer.
- Synomones benefit the producer and the receiver.

While some chemicals are targeted at individuals of the same species, others are used for communication across species. The use of scents is especially well-developed in social insects. Cuticular hydrocarbons are nonstructural materials produced and secreted to the cuticle surface to fight desiccation and pathogens. They are important, too, as pheromones, especially in social insects.

== Pheromones ==
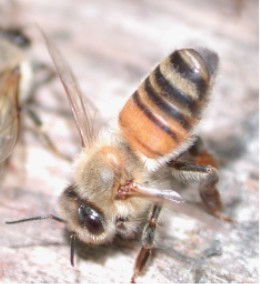
A fanning honeybee exposes Nasonov's gland (white stripe at tip of abdomen) releasing pheromone to entice swarm into an empty hive

Pheromones are of two main kinds: primer pheromones, which generate a long-duration change in the insect that receives them, or releaser pheromones, which cause an immediate change in behaviour. Primers include the queen pheromones essential to maintain the caste structure of social Hymenopteran colonies; they tend to be non-volatile and are dispersed by workers across the colony. In some ants and wasps, the queen pheromones are cuticular hydrocarbons.

Releaser pheromones
Type	Function	Notes
Sex	Bring sexes together for mating	Well-studied in Lepidoptera
Invitation	Stimulate feeding or oviposition at a site	
Aggregation	Bring individuals together	Temporarily in sub-social insects; permanently in social insects
Dispersal or spacing	Reduce intraspecific competition for a scarce resource	
Alarm	Signal attack or alarm	Mostly in colonial insects
Trail	Mark a line on a surface as a path to be followed	Mainly in Hymenoptera (e.g. ants) and Isoptera (termites); a few Lepidoptera (e.g. processionary moths)
Territorial and home range	Mark a territory or range	
Surface and funeral	Dead ants stimulate their removal from the nest.	Possibly assist in recognition of colony or species

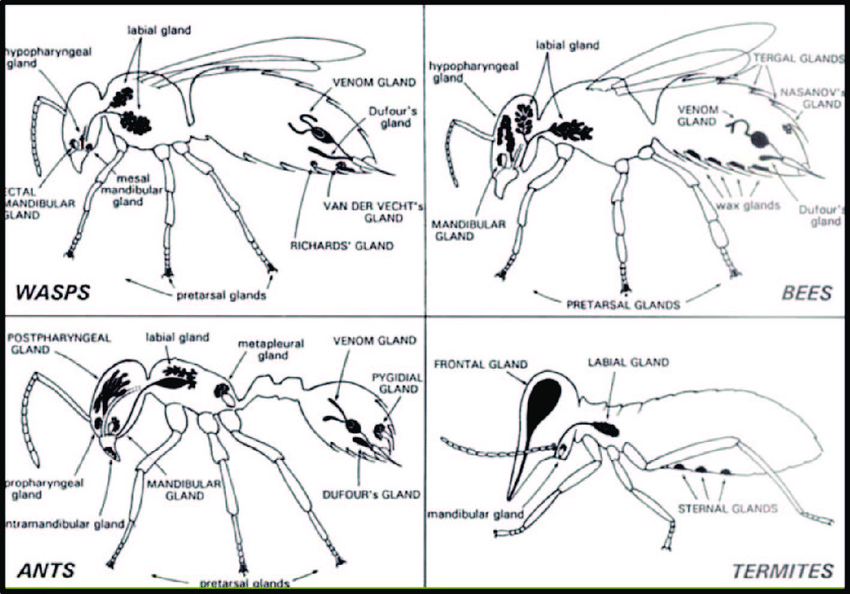
Pheromonal glands (UPPER CASE) in social insects

Eusocial insects including ants, termites, bees, and social wasps produce pheromones from several types of exocrine gland. These include mandibular glands in the head, and Dufour's, tergal, and other glands in the abdomen.

== Mimicry ==
Chemical communication within a species can be usurped by other species in chemical mimicry. The mimic produces allomones or pheromones to influence the behaviour of another insect, the dupe, to the mimic's advantage. The type of mimicry can be Batesian, in which the mimic gains protection by resembling a harmful insect; it can also be Müllerian, in which different well-defended insects resemble each other, in this case chemically, to minimise losses to predators; aggressive, enabling a predatory mimic to approach its prey; or reproductive, as in Pouyannian mimicry, when an orchid chemically (and visually) resembles a pollinator such as a bee or wasp, which tries to copulate with the flower, transferring pollen in the process. It occurs, too, in ant mimicry, where a mimic such as a butterfly larva is enabled to live within a colony of ants, that would otherwise kill it, by producing antlike semiochemicals.

== Human uses of pheromones ==
Human uses of pheromones include their application instead of insecticides in orchards. Pest insects such as fruit moths are attracted by sex pheromones, allowing farmers to evaluate pest levels, and if need be to provide sufficient pheromone to disrupt mating.
