= Pseudocopulation =

Biological process

Pseudocopulation in Pouyannian mimicry

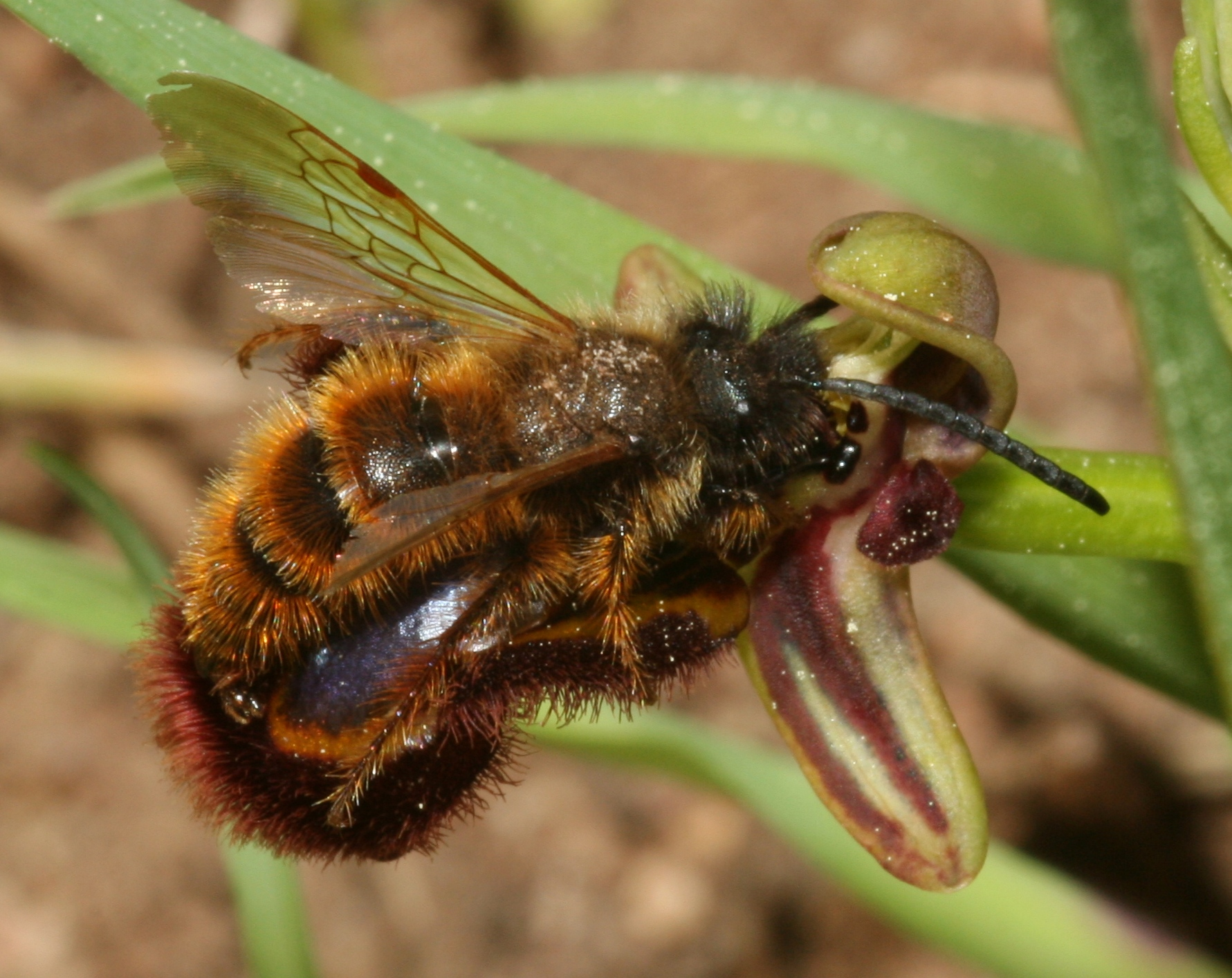
Dupe: Dasyscolia ciliata, a scoliid wasp, attempting to copulate with a flower of the orchid Ophrys speculum

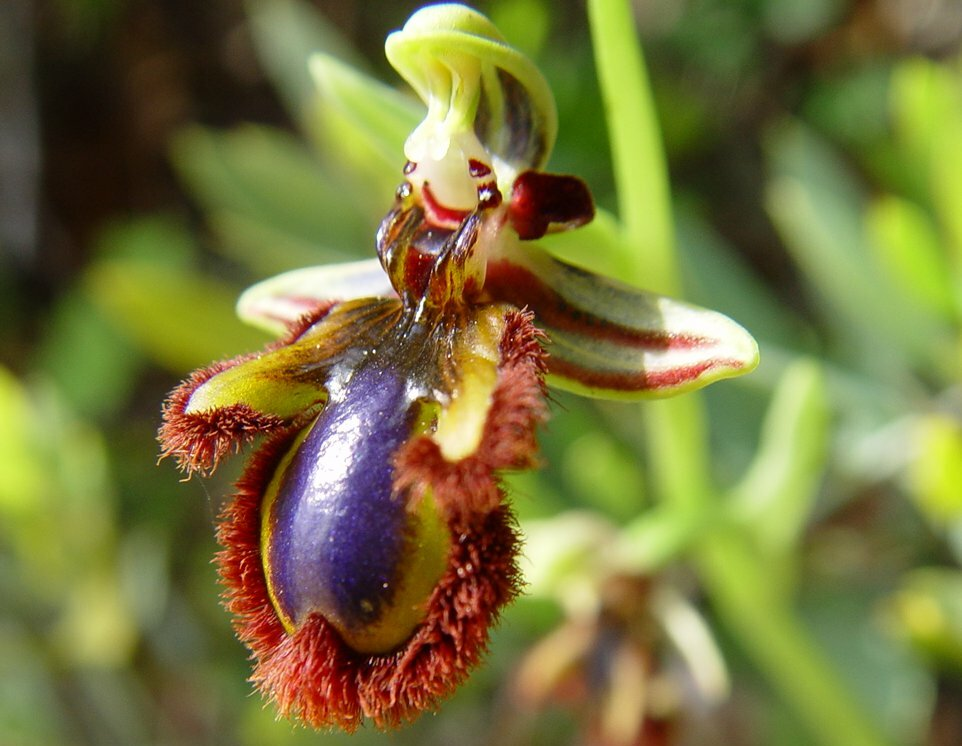
Mimic: Ophrys speculum, the mirror bee orchid

Pseudocopulation is a behavior similar to copulation that serves a reproductive function for one or both participants but does not involve actual sexual union between the individuals. It is most generally applied to a pollinator attempting to copulate with a flower adapted to mimic a potential female mate. The resemblance may be visual, but the key stimuli are often chemical and tactile. The form of mimicry in plants that deceives an insect into pseudocopulation is called Pouyannian mimicry after the French lawyer and amateur botanist Maurice-Alexandre Pouyanne.

A non-mimetic form of pseudocopulation has been observed in some parthenogenetic, all-female species of lizard. The behaviour does not appear to be necessary to trigger parthenogenesis.

== Definition ==
In zoology, pseudocopulation is attempted copulation that serves a reproductive function for one or both participants but does not involve actual sexual union between the individuals.

== In orchids ==
Pseudocopulation by an insect on a flower is a result of Pouyannian mimicry, named after the French lawyer and amateur botanist Maurice-Alexandre Pouyanne. This occurs in several orchids, whose flowers mimic the female mating signals of specific pollinator insects, such as bees. The mimicry results in attempted copulation by males of the pollinator species, facilitating pollen transfer. Bee orchids (Ophrys apifera) and fly orchids (Ophrys insectifera), specifically, utilize flower morphology, coloration, and scent to deceive their respective pollinators. These orchids have evolved traits matching the preferences of specific pollinator niches, leading to adaptive speciation. Although bee and fly orchids are visual mimics of their pollinators, visual traits are not the only (nor the most important) ones mimicked to increase attraction.

== In lizards ==
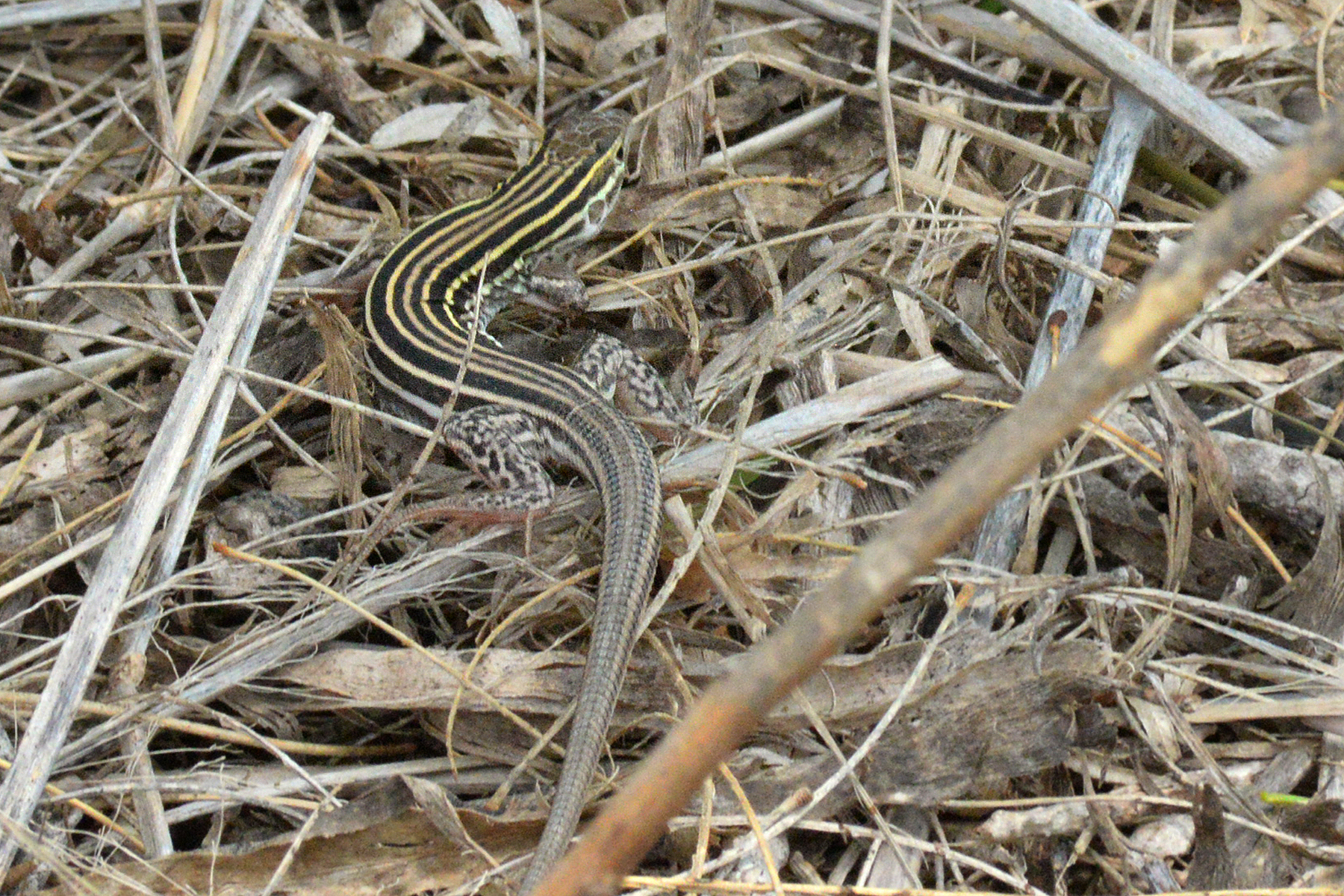
The Laredo striped whiptail is parthenogenetic, and practises pseudocopulation.

Some lizard species, such as the Laredo striped whiptail (Aspidoscelis [Cnemidophorus] laredoensis) and the Desert grassland whiptail lizard (A. uniparens), consist only of females, which reproduce by parthenogenesis. Some of these species have been observed to practise pseudocopulation in captivity, but it does not appear to be required to trigger parthenogenesis.
