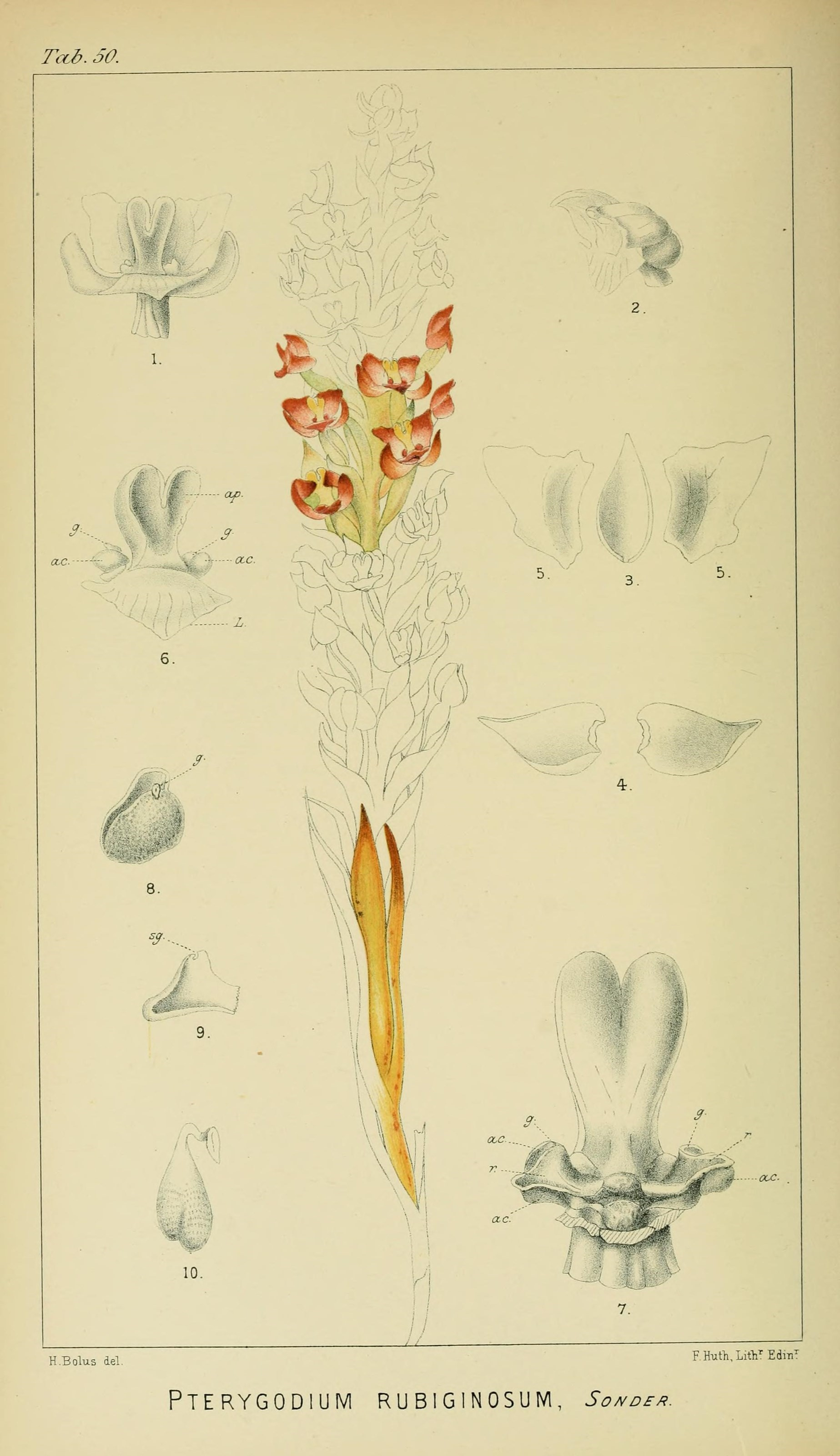
- Botanical illustration of Evotella rubiginosa

Scientific classification
- Kingdom: Plantae
- Clade: Tracheophytes
- Clade: Angiosperms
- Clade: Monocots
- Order: Asparagales
- Family: Orchidaceae
- Subfamily: Orchidoideae
- Tribe: Orchideae
- Subtribe: Coryciinae
- Genus: Evotella; Kurzweil & H.P.Linder
- Species: E. rubiginosa

Binomial name
- Evotella rubiginosa (Sond. ex Bolus) Kurzweil & H.P.Linder

Synonyms
- Pterygodium rubiginosum Sond. ex Bolus; Corycium rubiginosum (Sond. ex Bolus) Rolfe in W.H.Harvey

= Evotella =

Genus of flowering plants in the orchid family

Evotella is a genus of flowering plants from the orchid family, Orchidaceae. It contains only one known species, Evotella rubiginosa, endemic to South Africa.

== See also ==
- List of Orchidaceae genera
