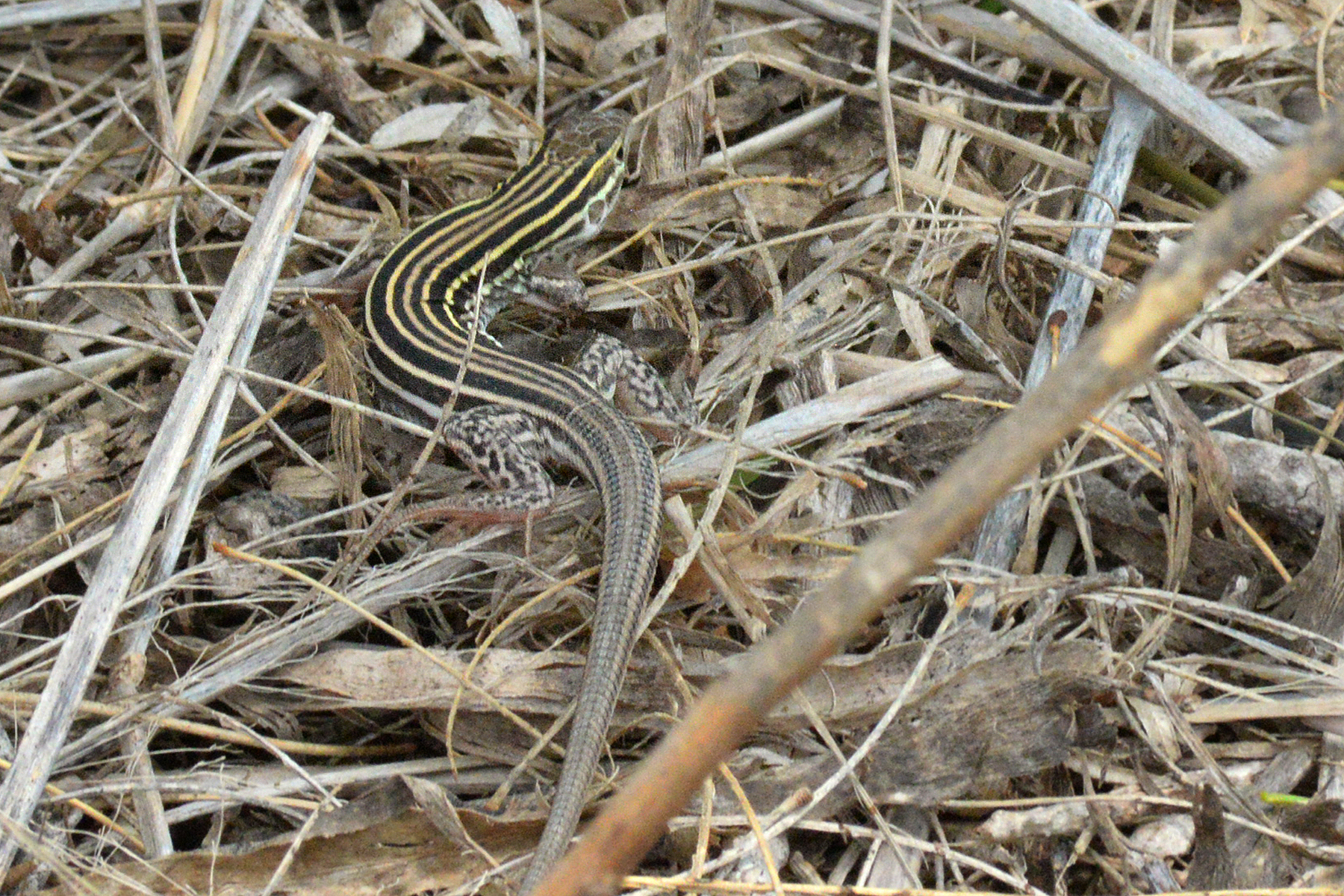
- Laredo striped whiptail (Aspidoscelis laredoensis), Hidalgo County, Texas

Conservation status
- Least Concern (IUCN 3.1)

Scientific classification
- Kingdom: Animalia
- Phylum: Chordata
- Class: Reptilia
- Order: Squamata
- Family: Teiidae
- Genus: Aspidoscelis
- Species: A. laredoensis

Binomial name
- Aspidoscelis laredoensis (McKinney, Kay, Anderson, 1973)

Synonyms
- Cnemidophorus laredoensis McKinney, Kay, & Anderson, 1973

= Laredo striped whiptail =

Species of lizard

The Laredo striped whiptail (Aspidoscelis laredoensis) is a species of lizard found in the southern United States, in Texas, and northern Mexico in Coahuila, Nuevo Leon, and Tamaulipas. Some sources believe it to be the result of extensive hybridization between the Texas spotted whiptail, Aspidoscelis gularis and the six-lined racerunner, Aspidoscelis sexlineatus. It is one of many lizard species known to be parthenogenic.

== Description ==
The Laredo striped whiptail grows from 6 to 11 inches in length. It has an overall color of dark green or dark brown, with 7 yellow or white stripes that run from head to tail, and a white underside. They are thin bodied, with a long tail.

== Behavior ==
Like other species of whiptail lizard, it is diurnal and insectivorous. They are wary, energetic, and fast moving, darting for cover if approached. Its preferred habitat is areas with sandy soils and sparse vegetation. They are often found in cultivated fields and pasture land. The species reproduces through parthenogenesis, the female lays up to four unfertilized eggs in mid summer, which hatch in approximately six weeks.
