= Sensory trap hypothesis =

The sensory trap hypothesis describes an evolutionary idea that revolves around mating behavior and female mate choice. It is a model of female preference and male sexual trait evolution through what is known as sensory exploitation. Sensory exploitation, or a sensory trap is an event that occurs in nature where male members of a species perform behaviors or display visual traits that resemble a non-sexual stimulus which females are responsive to. This tricks females into engaging with the males, thus creating more mating opportunities for males. What makes it a sensory trap is that these female responses evolved in a non-sexual context, and the male produced stimulus exploits the female response which would not otherwise occur without the mimicked stimulus.

== Limitations ==
The term "trap" indicates that these sensory trap events may be detrimental to female mating success, but they may not always be costly. In fact, there are circumstances where not responding to the stimulus itself can be costly, as females may ignore the actual stimulus in the correct context, and lose the fitness benefits that come with it. There are also circumstances where these traps can actually be beneficial in the context of mate choice, where the females who are responding to the trap end up gaining high-quality males to mate with.

While these sensory traps can be quite successful when they appropriately mimic the non-sexual stimulus, they often become exaggerated as a result of excessive selection to the point where they are no longer useful. This is due to the trait or behavior becoming imperceptible or no longer resembling the original stimulus.

== Sensory traps in nature ==
- Photinus, Photuris, and Pyractomena Firefly males use patterned light flashes that mimic the females' prey species when they are flying above them, which evokes a female response including their own pattern of flashing lights that the males use to locate them for mating.
- Neumania papillator males engage in leg trembling (known as male courtship trembling) that hunting females mistake for prey, leading them to engage with the males and increase the likelihood of mating.
- Metaplastes ornatus Bush Cricket males have a genital plate that, when inserted into the female genital chamber, potentially mimics a stimulus that is created by the egg during female ovulation, which then leads to a fertilization response and increased mating success.
- Grapholita molesta Oriental Fruit Moth males release an odor that contains the chemical ethyl trans-cinnamate, a compound that is found in fruit juices that are fed on by these moths, leading to a female response and interaction with the male.
- Philanthus triangulum European Beewolf males release pheromones that include the chemical (Z)-11-eicosen-1-ol, a chemical also found on the cuticle of females' sole prey, honeybees, which attracts the females to these males.
- Pisaura mirabilis Nursery Web Spider males use nuptial gifts in the form of prey covered in silk that resembles the female egg sac, which is thought to exploit either the female's maternal instinct or foraging instinct, and can lead to mating with the males who presented the gift.
- Calopterygidae Damselfly males exploit a sensory bias in females of different Damselfly species by causing them to eject previously stored sperm from their spermathecae through stimulation of the vaginal sensilla using the aedeagus, which is not capable of invoking the same response in females of their own species.
- Hirundo rustica gutturalis barn swallow males attract females by mimicking the food-begging calls of nestlings.
- Leptuca musica/beebei fiddler crab males build sand hoods or mud pillars next to the entrances of their burrows. Females approach the structures built by males for safety, regardless of whether they're searching for mates or not. Therefore, they act as a successful mimic of objects that crabs normally approach for landmark orientation and to escape from predators. Furthermore, comparative research between species of fiddler crabs has shown that female preference for the structures is not species-specific, as is usually the case for female preferences for sexual signals. This indicates that this behavior has evolved for predator avoidance and landmark orientation, and not in the context of mate choice. Regardless, females benefit from the presence of such structures built by males as they help females locate males more efficiently and they reduce predation risk. Structure building is suggested to be a condition-dependent trait in these crabs. Females that mate with structure building males therefore, may have access to higher quality mates.
- Petromyzon marinus sea lamprey females use chemical cues released by larvae to locate spawning grounds. The males release a sex pheromone that contains the same compound as the larval cue to attract the females. It seems that the preference of females for the compound evolutionary precedes the exploitation of the compound by males for female attraction. It is imperative for females to distinguish between the larval cue and the male pheromone because the females are timely constrained to mate. The females use a second compound within the pheromone to distinguish between the larval cue and the male pheromone to not mistakenly approach spawning grounds while trying to locate males. This is an example of how females can distinguish between the original and the mimicked signal and benefit from a sensory trap.
- In some species of the Goodeidae fish, the males have a terminal yellow band at the end of their tail, which is visually similar to damselfly larvae. The females (and sometimes males) are attracted to this band because it resembles their prey. In the species where the band is more conspicuous, the feeding response of females is reduced towards the band. However, the sexual attractiveness of the band to females does not change. This suggests that selection might have enabled the females to distinguish between the feeding and sexual response without becoming resistant to the mimetic male signal that might prevent females from recognizing their prey.
- In Iberolacerta monticola Iberian rock lizards, the femoral secretion of the males may act as a sensory trap for females as it contains, provitamin-D3, that is also found in their prey. However, only males that are of higher quality and are better fed can allocate more of this compound to secretions and better attract females. Therefore, this signal can act as an honest indicator of male quality.
- Sensory traps also sometimes play a role between species in predation and parasitism. For example, in a firefly species, the females attract and prey upon male fireflies of other species by mimicking the courtship signal of their females. Similarly some spiders mimic sex pheromones or courtship displays of other species of animals to attract prey.
