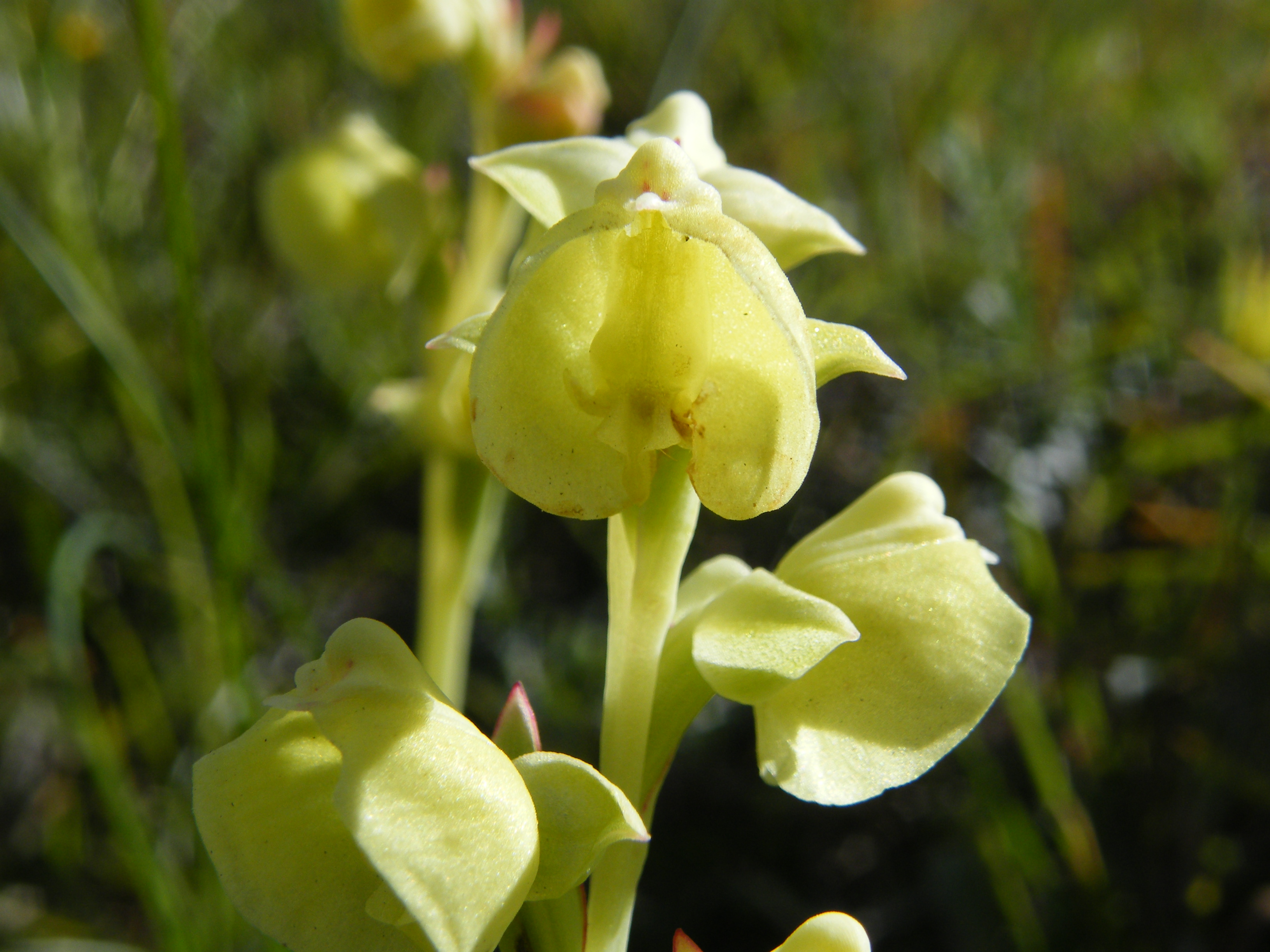
- Pterygodium catholicum

Scientific classification
- Kingdom: Plantae
- Clade: Embryophytes
- Clade: Tracheophytes
- Clade: Spermatophytes
- Clade: Angiosperms
- Clade: Monocots
- Order: Asparagales
- Family: Orchidaceae
- Subfamily: Orchidoideae
- Tribe: Orchideae
- Subtribe: Coryciinae
- Genus: Pterygodium; Sw.

Synonyms
- Ommatodium Lindl.; Anochilus (Schltr.) Rolfe in W.H.Harvey & auct. suc.

= Pterygodium =

Genus of flowering plants in the orchid family

Pterygodium is a genus of flowering plants from the orchid family, Orchidaceae. It found primarily in southern Africa (South Africa, Lesotho, Eswatini) but one species is endemic to Tanzania.

Species accepted as of June 2014:

- Pterygodium acutifolium Lindl. - Cape Province
- Pterygodium afrum (L.) Sw. - Cape Province
- Pterygodium alatum (Thunb.) Sw. - Cape Province
- Pterygodium catholicum (L.) Sw. - Cape Province
- Pterygodium cleistogamum (Bolus) Schltr. - Cape Province
- Pterygodium connivens Schelpe - Cape Province
- Pterygodium cooperi Rolfe in W.H.Harvey & auct. suc. - Cape Province, Kwazulu-Natal, Lesotho
- Pterygodium cruciferum Sond. - Cape Province
- Pterygodium hallii (Schelpe) Kurzweil & H.P.Linder - Cape Province
- Pterygodium hastatum Bolus - Cape Province, Kwazulu-Natal, Lesotho, Free State, Mpumalanga, Eswatini
- Pterygodium inversum (Thunb.) Sw. - Cape Province
- Pterygodium leucanthum Bolus - Cape Province, Kwazulu-Natal, Lesotho
- Pterygodium magnum Rchb.f. - Cape Province, Kwazulu-Natal, Free State, Mpumalanga
- Pterygodium newdigatae Bolus - Cape Province
- Pterygodium pentherianum Schltr. - Cape Province
- Pterygodium platypetalum Lindl. - Cape Province
- Pterygodium schelpei H.P.Linder - Cape Province
- Pterygodium ukingense Schltr. - Tanzania
- Pterygodium vermiferum E.G.H.Oliv. & Liltved - Cape Province
- Pterygodium volucris (L.f.) Sw. - Cape Province

== See also ==
- List of Orchidaceae genera
