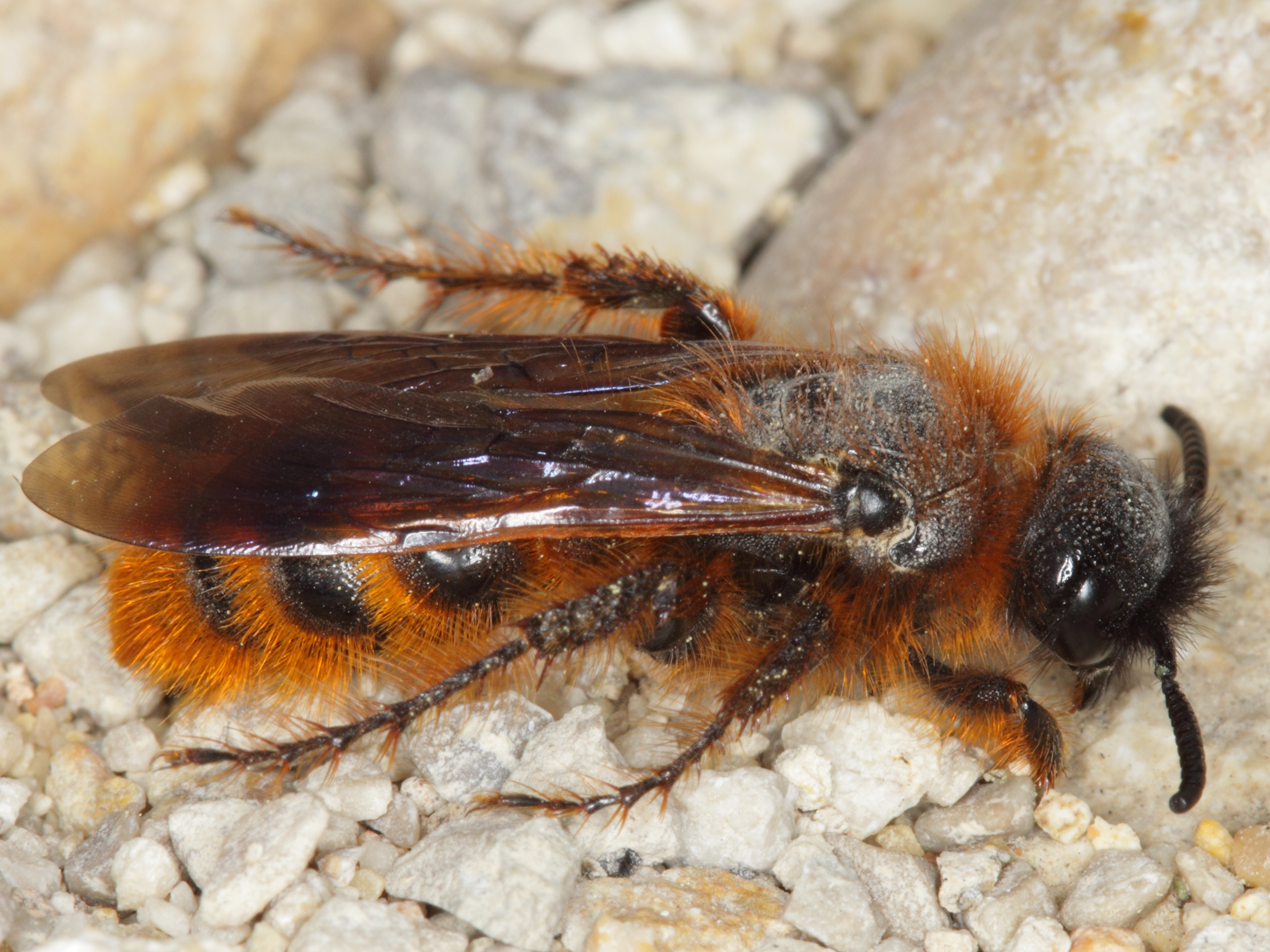

Scientific classification
- Domain: Eukaryota
- Kingdom: Animalia
- Phylum: Arthropoda
- Class: Insecta
- Order: Hymenoptera
- Family: Scoliidae
- Subfamily: Scoliinae
- Tribe: Campsomerini
- Genus: Dasyscolia; Bradley, 1951
- Species: D. ciliata

Binomial name
- Dasyscolia ciliata (Fabricius, 1787)

Synonyms
- Tiphia ciliata Fabricius, 1787; Scolia aurea Fabricius, 1793; Colpa rufa Lepeletier, 1845; Elis aurea Saussure, 1854; Campsoscolia ciliata Betrem, 1933; Campsomeris ciliata Guiglia, 1937

= Dasyscolia =

Species of wasp

Dasyscolia ciliata is a species of scoliid wasp found throughout the Mediterranean. It is the only species in the genus Dasyscolia. It is the only known pollinator of the European Ophrys speculum. The male wasp is tricked into pollinating the Ophrys orchid via pseudocopulation. The orchid's Pouyannian mimicry has the flower effectively mimicking the female wasp in appearance and scent.
