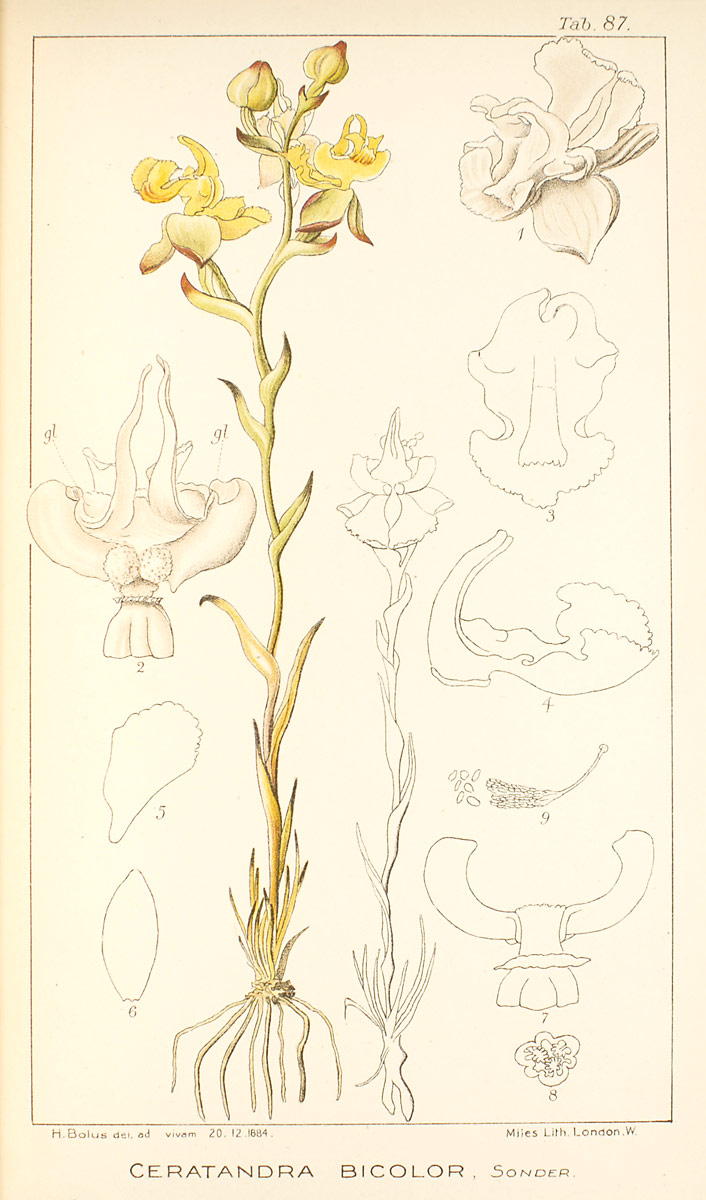
- Ceratandra bicolor

Scientific classification
- Kingdom: Plantae
- Clade: Tracheophytes
- Clade: Angiosperms
- Clade: Monocots
- Order: Asparagales
- Family: Orchidaceae
- Subfamily: Orchidoideae
- Tribe: Orchideae
- Subtribe: Coryciinae
- Genus: Ceratandra; Lindl. in F.A.Bauer & J.Lindley
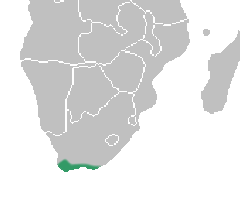
- Distribution

Synonyms
- Ceratandropsis Rolfe in W.H.Harvey; Evota (Lindl.) Rolfe in W.H.Harvey

= Ceratandra =

Genus of flowering plants belonging to the orchid family

Ceratandra is a genus of flowering plants from the orchid family, Orchidaceae. It contains 6 known species, all endemic to South Africa.

- Ceratandra atrata (L.) T.Durand & Schinz
- Ceratandra bicolor Sond. ex Bolus
- Ceratandra globosa Lindl.
- Ceratandra grandiflora Lindl.
- Ceratandra harveyana Lindl.
- Ceratandra venosa (Lindl.) Schltr.

== See also ==
- List of Orchidaceae genera
