= Pollinium =

Coherent mass of pollen grains

A pollinium (pl.: pollinia) is a coherent mass of pollen grains in a plant that are the product of only one anther, but are transferred, during pollination, as a single unit. This is regularly seen in orchids, which have a complex pollination system, and many species of milkweeds (Asclepiadoideae). Usage of the term differs: in some orchids two masses of pollen are well attached to one another, but in other orchids there are two halves (with two separate viscidia) each of which is sometimes referred to as a pollinium.

Most orchids have waxy pollinia. These are connected to one or two elongate stipes, which in turn are attached to a sticky viscidium, a disc-shaped structure that sticks to a visiting insect.

Some orchid genera have mealy pollinia. These are tapering into a caudicle (stalk), attached to the viscidium. They extend into the middle section of the column.

The pollinarium is a collective term that means either (1) the complete set of pollinia from all the anthers of a flower, as in Asclepiadoideae, (2) in Asclepiadoideae, a pair of pollinia and the parts that connect them (corpusculum and translator arms), or (3) in orchids, a pair of pollinia with two viscidia and the other connecting parts.

Milkweed pollinia are housed within a stigma chamber at the bottom of anther slits of its flower. A pollinating insect often stumbles in such a way that its legs fall down the slits, then pull up the pollinia as it tries to free its legs; the pollinia can be carried to another flower and dropped down the latter's slits to achieve pollination. However, the insect sometimes fails to retract its legs from the slits and is trapped there until it dies.

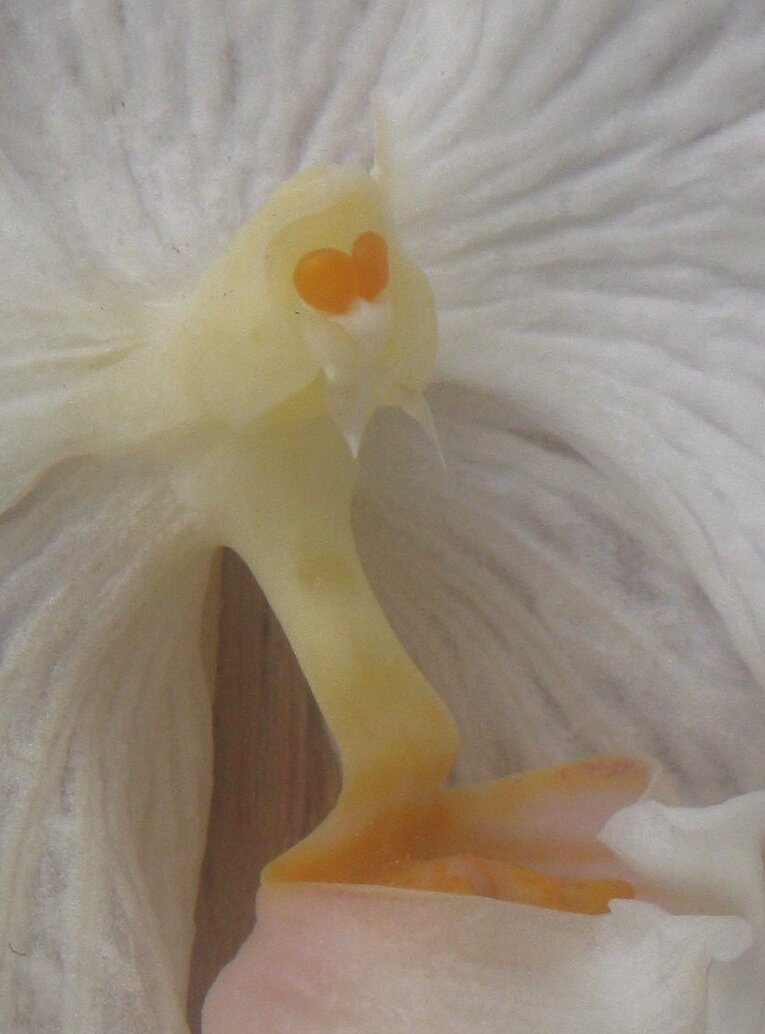
The waxy pollinia of a Phalaenopsis

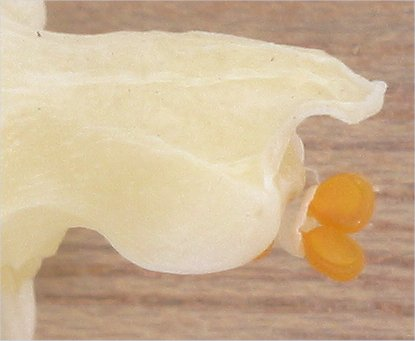
Pollinia of a Phalaenopsis orchid

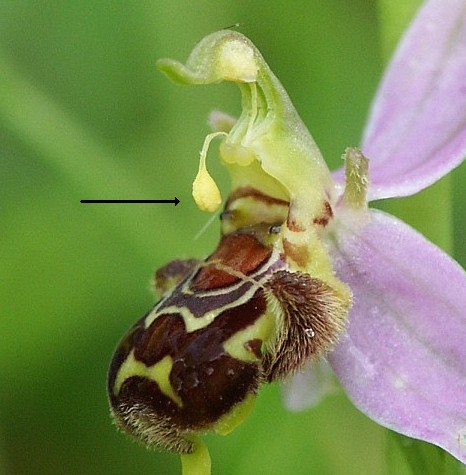
Pollinium of Ophrys apifera

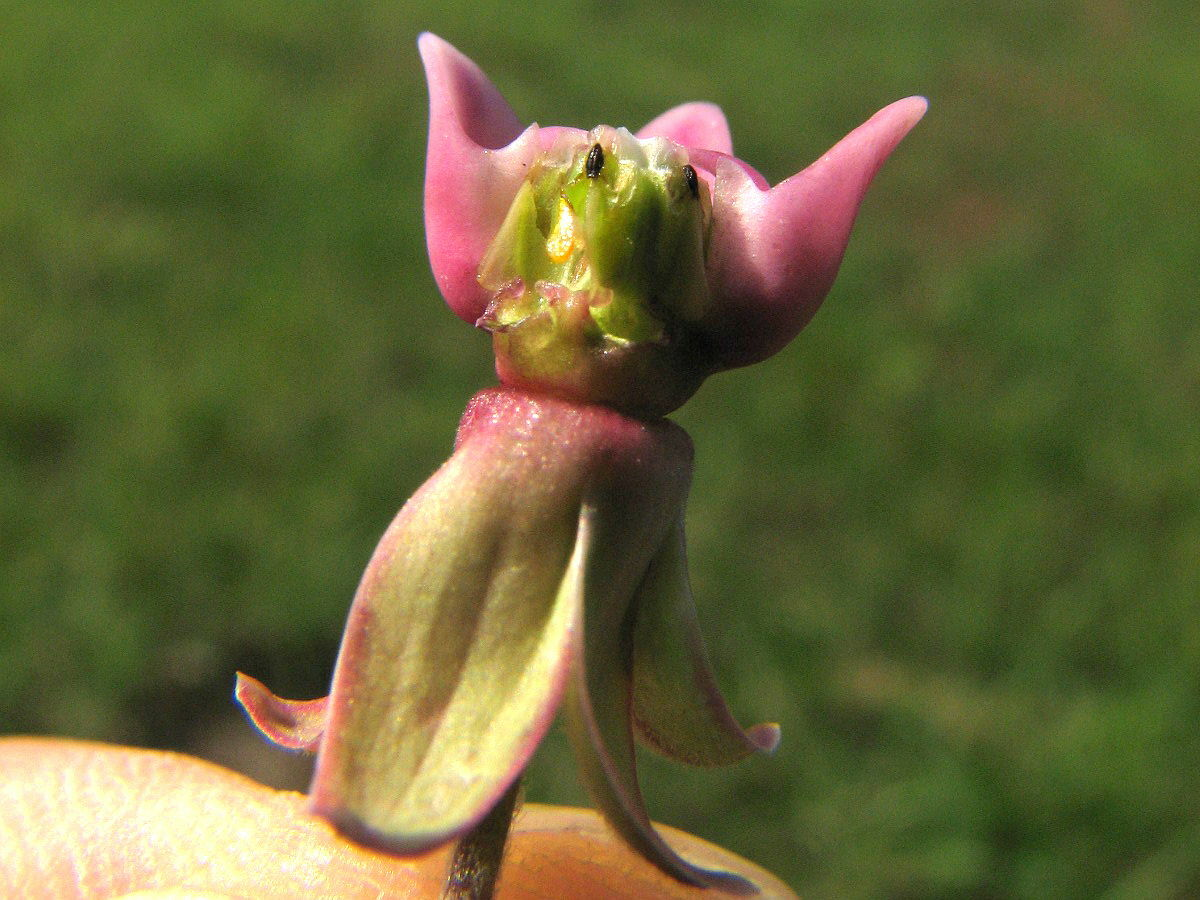
Pollinia of Asclepias syriaca

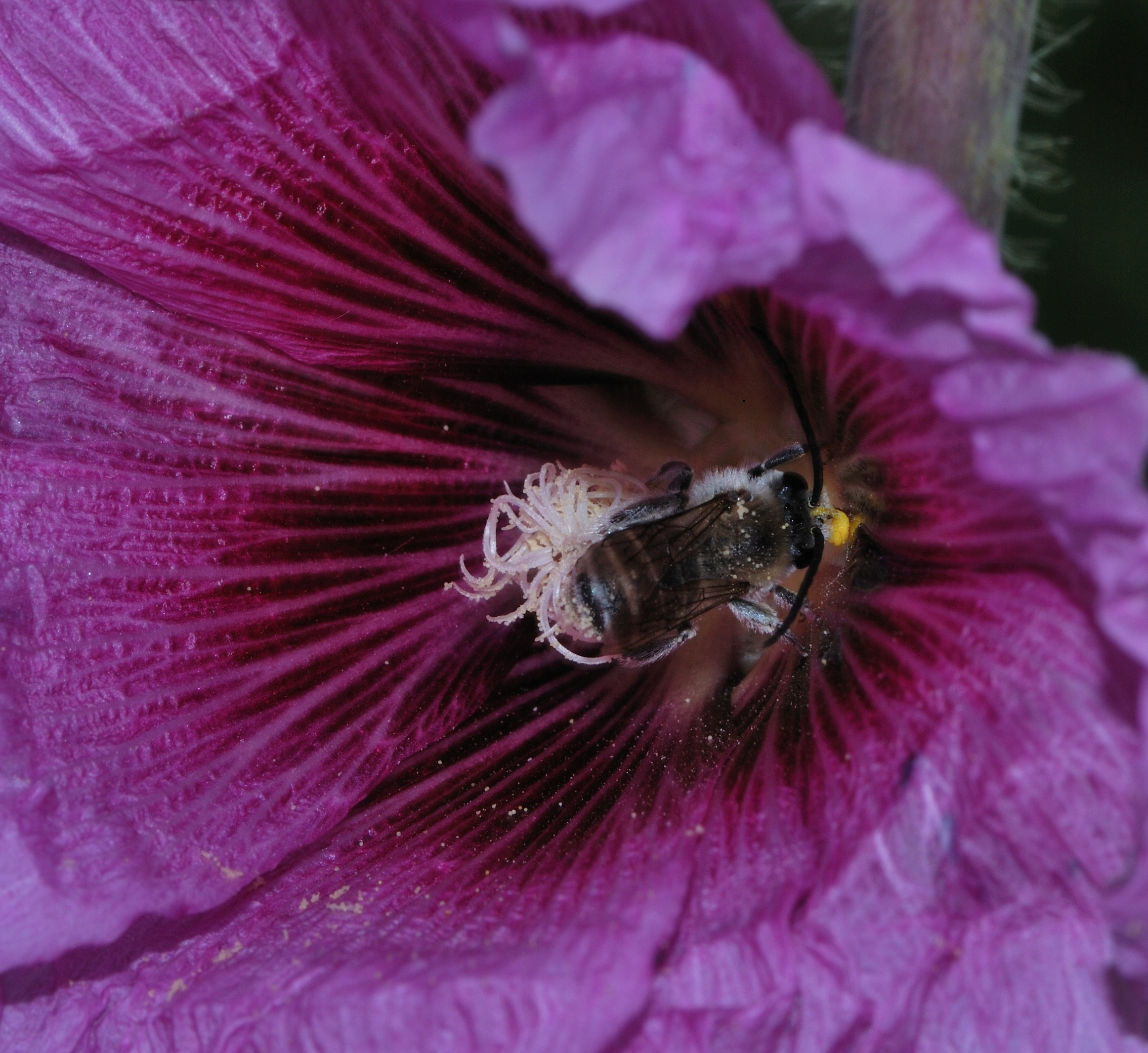
Male bee (Eucera cinnamomea) with pollinium attached to its head

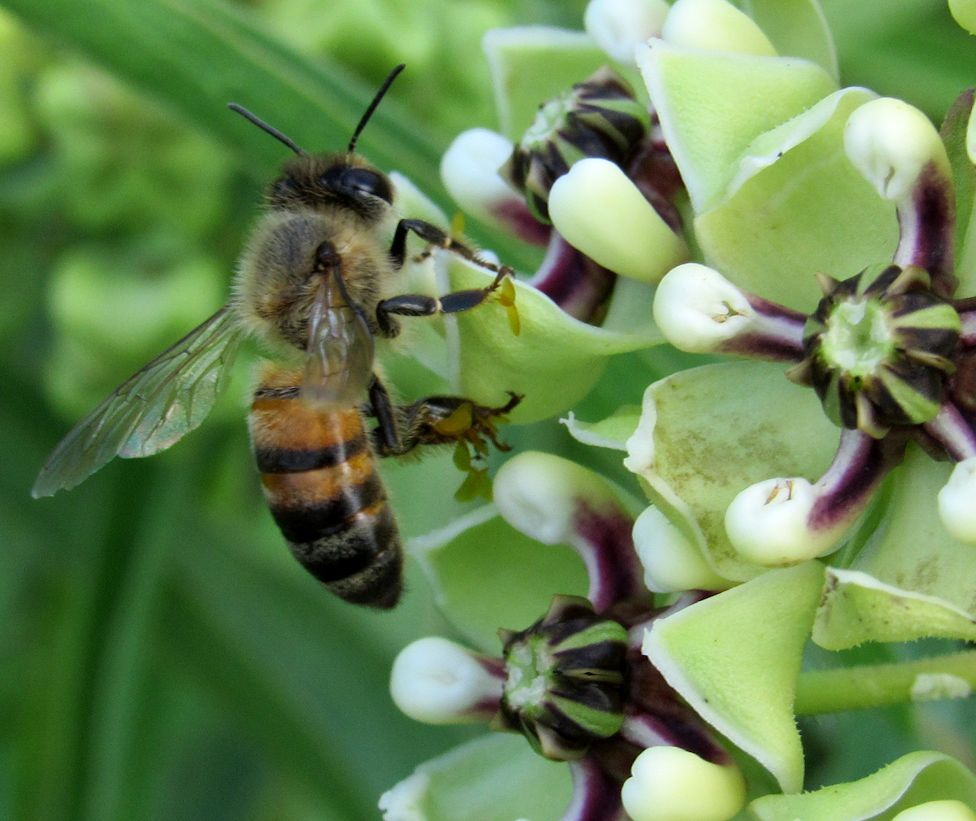
Honeybee on antelope horn (Asclepias asperula) with pollinia attached to legs

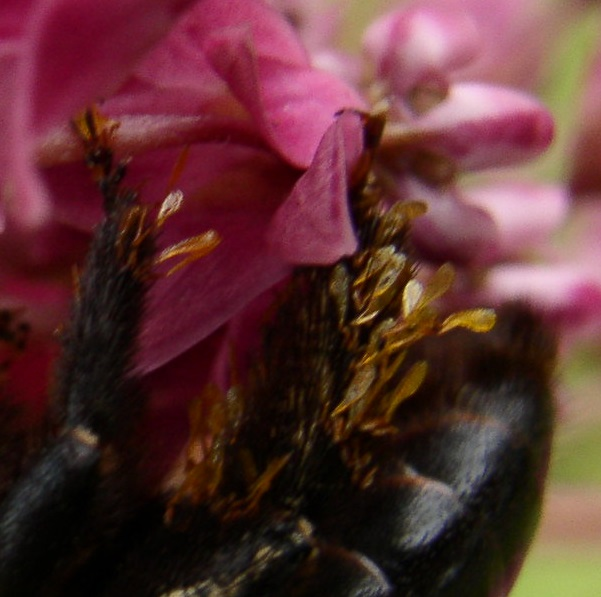
Pollinia of milkweed (Asclepias) on the legs of carpenteer bee (Xylocopa virginica)

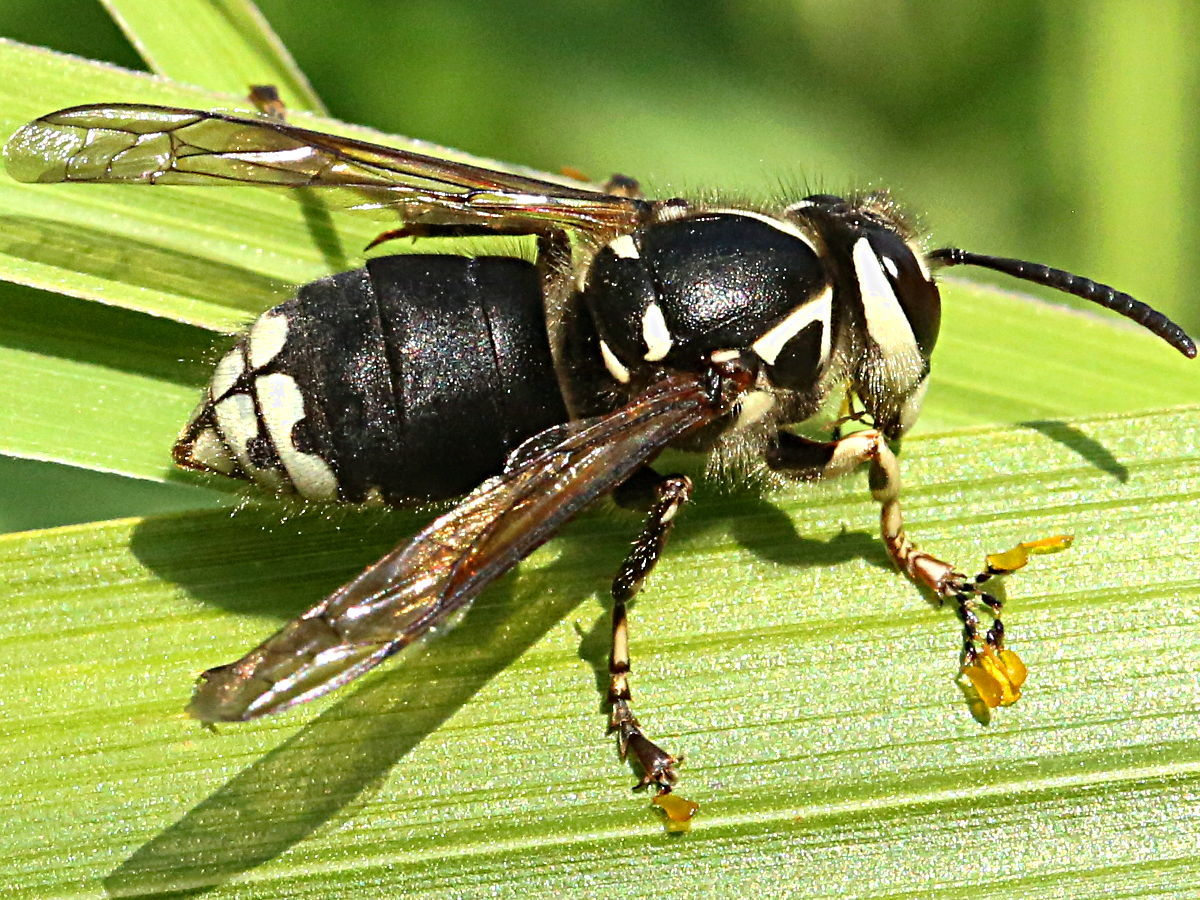
Pollinia of milkweed (Asclepias) on the legs of bald-faced hornet (Dolichovespula maculata)

Honeybee with a leg trapped in common milkweed pollinia slits
