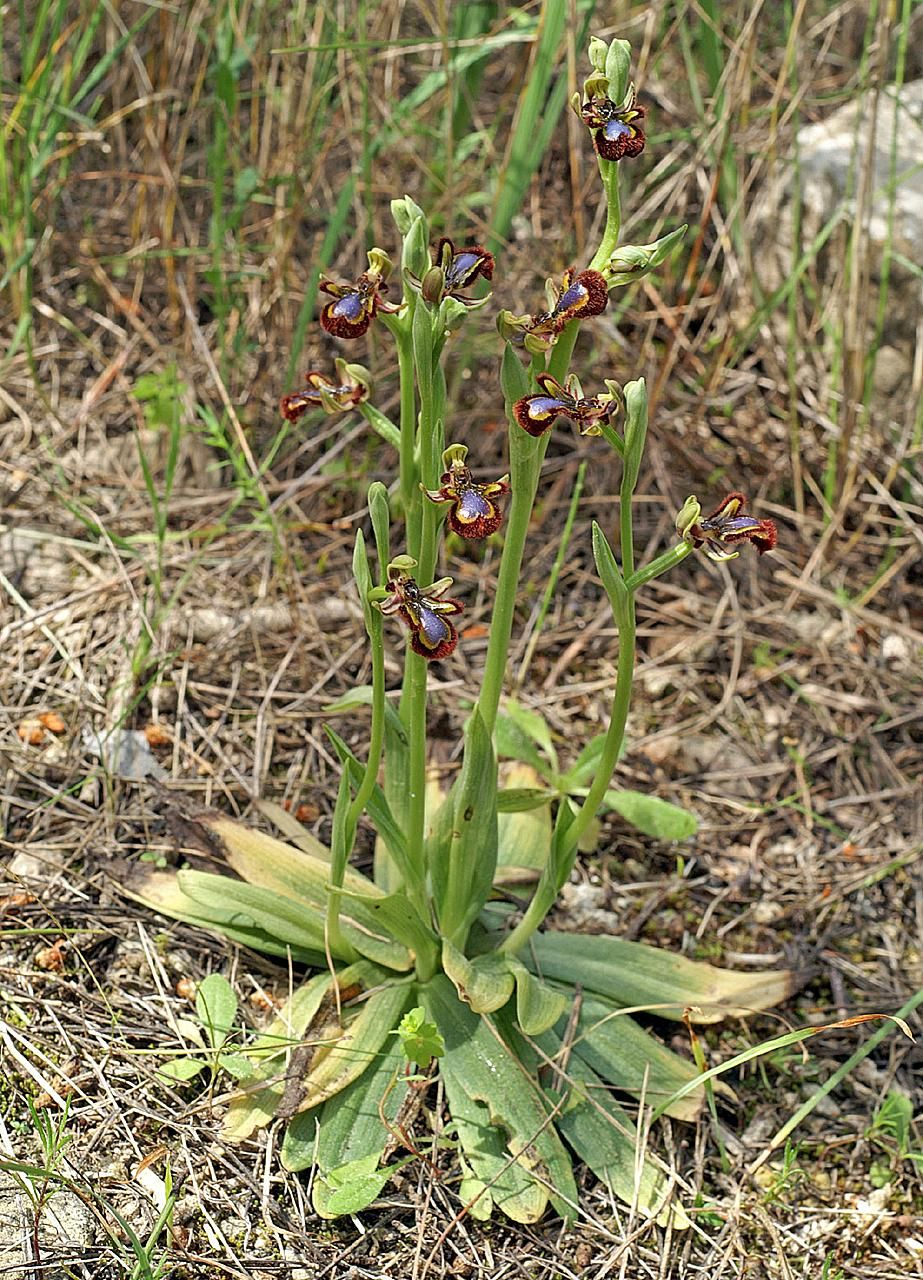

Scientific classification
- Kingdom: Plantae
- Clade: Embryophytes
- Clade: Tracheophytes
- Clade: Angiosperms
- Clade: Monocots
- Order: Asparagales
- Family: Orchidaceae
- Subfamily: Orchidoideae
- Genus: Ophrys
- Species: O. speculum

Binomial name
- Ophrys speculum Link

Synonyms
- Ophrys ciliata Biv.; Ophrys vernixia subsp. ciliata (Biv.) Del Prete; Ophrys scolopax Willd. (illegitimate name)

= Ophrys speculum =

Mirror orchid

Species of orchid

Ophrys speculum, the mirror orchid, is a species of Ophrys distributed throughout the Mediterranean that is pollinated exclusively by a single species of scoliid wasp.

== Description ==
A terrestrial orchid up to 25 cm tall and each inflorescence carries between 2 and 8 large flowers. The plants often grow in groups. In bright sunshine the flowers are highly visible as the light reflects off the speculum in the centre of the lip – it is a bright iridescent purple/blue in colour and very glossy. The lip is three-lobed and bordered by a greenish-yellow border which is surrounded by a band of thick velvety hairs which are reddish brown. The sepals and petals are green and marked with violet spots or stripes.

== Subspecies ==
- Ophrys speculum subsp. speculum Link – The plant diffusion is circum-Mediterranean (Morocco and the Iberian Peninsula to Anatolia and Lebanon), characterized by dark petals and a lobe from the lip moderately convex, with marginal brownish hairs.
- Ophrys speculum subsp. regis-ferdinandii – The plant is found in the eastern Aegean Islands and southwest Turkey at elevations of 0 to 800 meters. The fringes on the edge of the lip are light red and the side sections of the lip are dark green and less yellow. It is named after King Ferdinand I of Bulgaria.
- Ophrys speculum subsp. lusitanica – The plant is found in the Algarve region of Portugal and the Extremadura region of Spain at elevations of 0 to 800 meters. The fringes on the edge of the lip are light red and the side sections of the lip are dark green and less yellow.
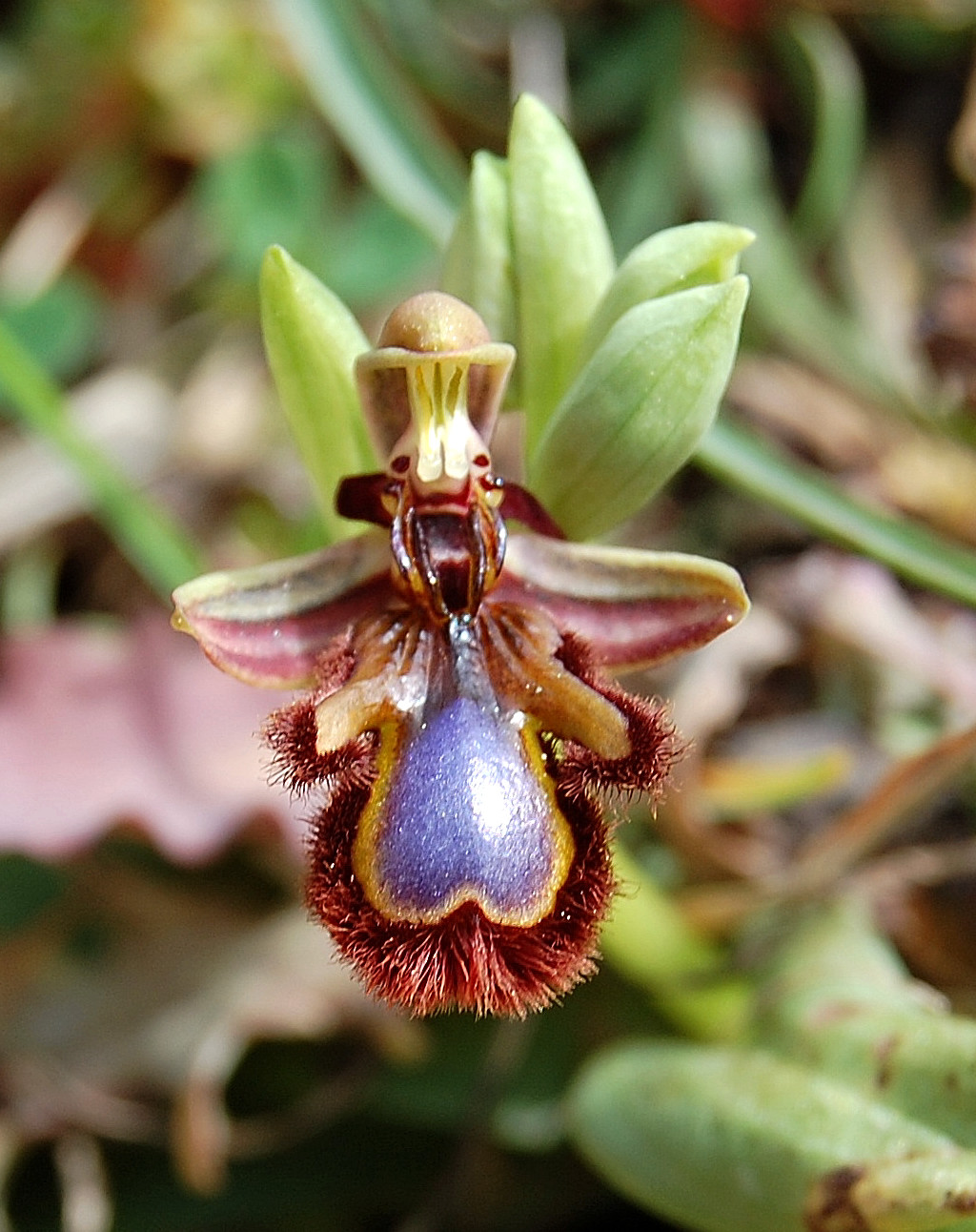
Ophrys speculum subsp. speculum

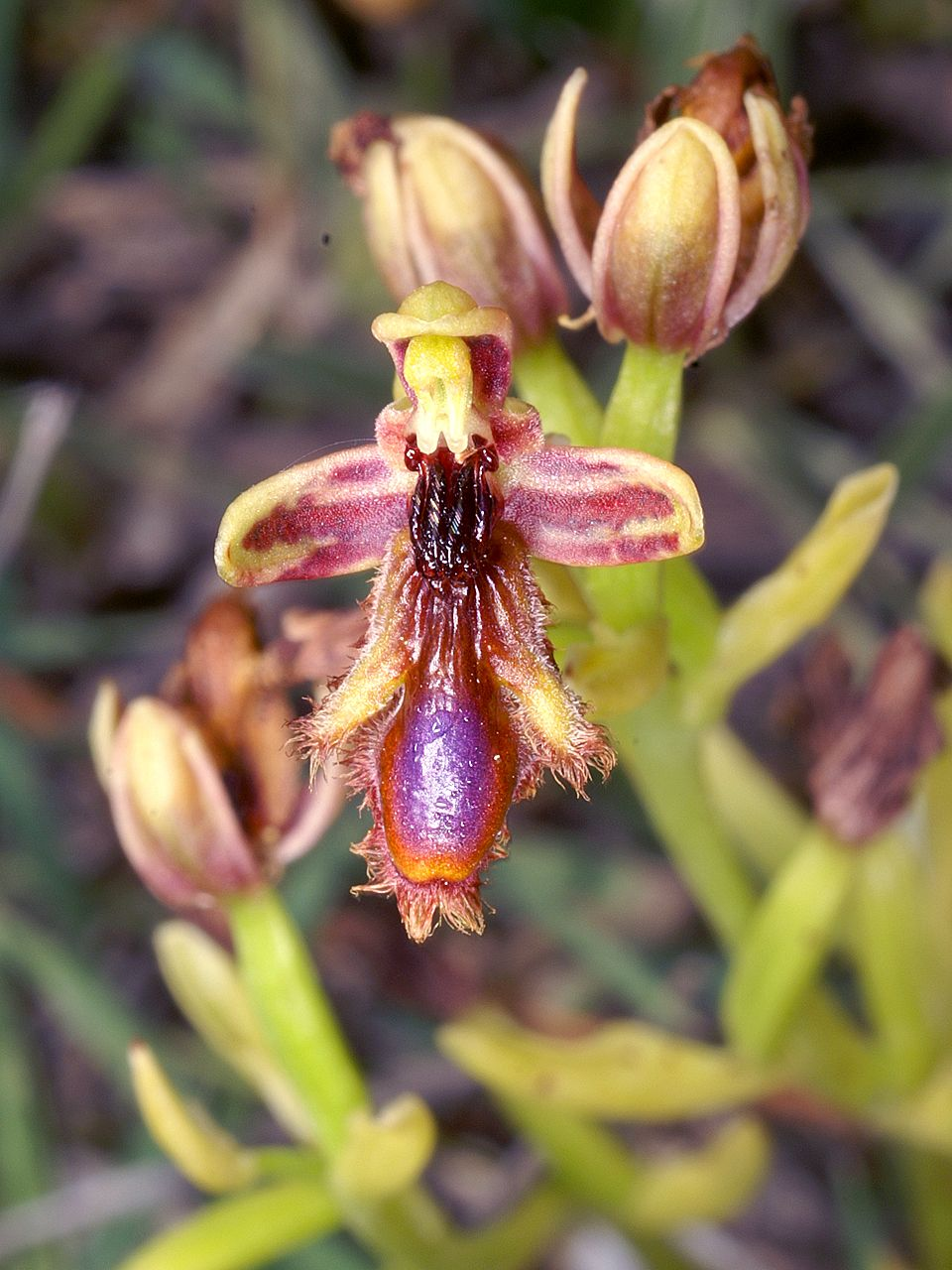
Ophrys speculum subsp. regis-ferdinandii

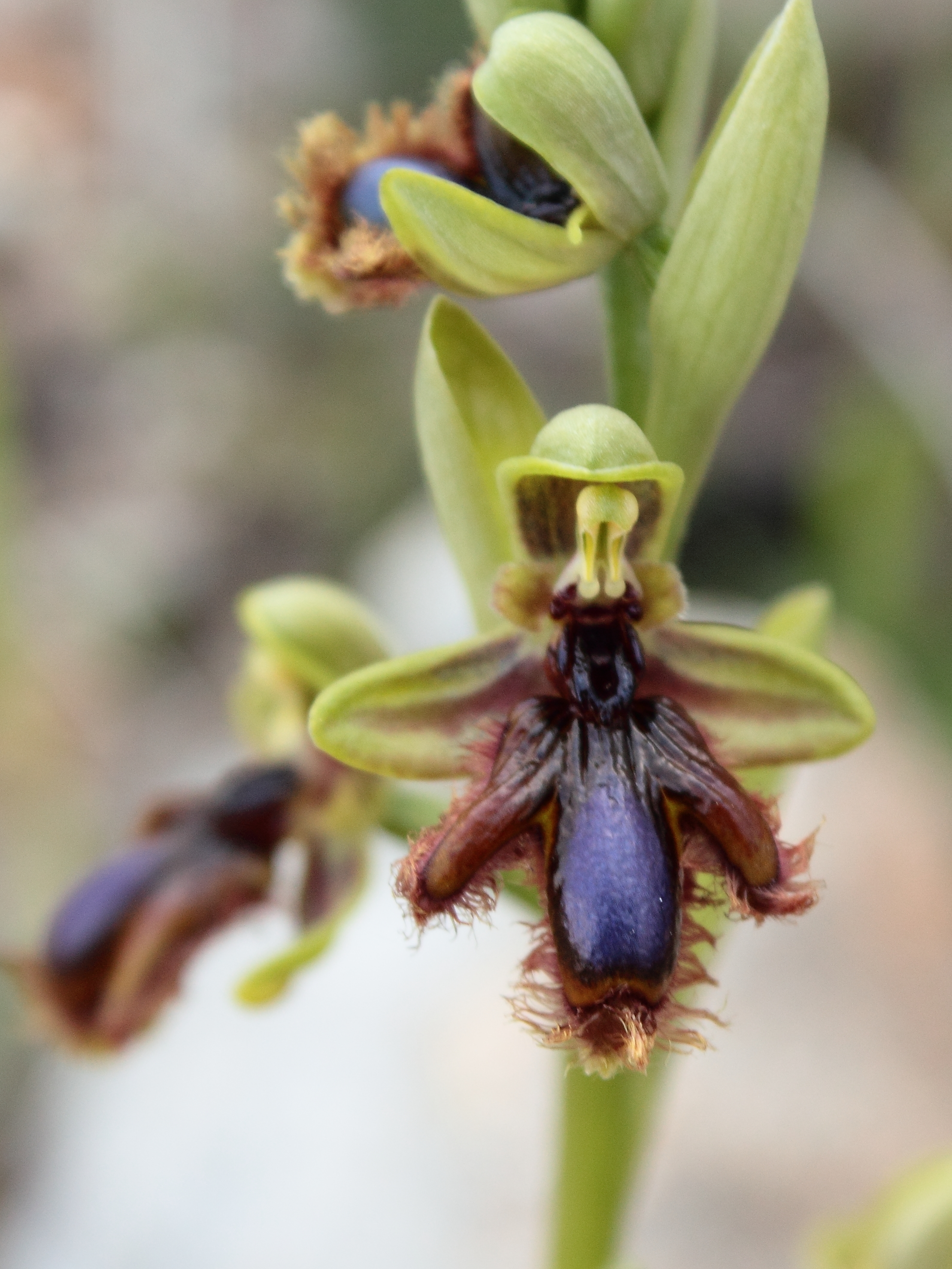
Ophrys speculum subsp. lusitanica

== Distribution ==
Ophrys speculum is spread throughout the Mediterranean region, and is particularly prolific in the Algarve region of Portugal. It becomes more scarce in the east. Other countries in Europe where this orchid is known to occur include Spain, Cyprus and Greece. It occurs up to 1,200 m above sea level.

== Habitat ==
The mirror orchid is found in stony and rocky places, grassland, scrub and pine forests, on dry to moist calcareous soils, in full sunlight or light shade.

== Pollination ==
It is pollinated exclusively by the wasp Dasyscolia ciliata. Males are lured by the flower, which resembles the female wasp. The flower and wasp are both hairy and the blue patch on the lip appears to mimic the reflection of the sky on the wasp's wings. Moreover, the floral scent resembles the mating pheromones of the female wasps, and males become highly excited and try to copulate with the flowers, pollinating them in the process.
