= Dhond (Goa) =

A dhond is a traditional devotee of the deity Lairai of Shirgao, Goa, who participates in a ritual fire-walking ceremony (homakund) held at night during the annual festival (jatra). Individuals typically pledge to become a Dhond—either themselves or a member of their family—during times of difficulty, seeking the deity's protection, the alleviation of crises, relief from negative planetary influences, or personal success. The practice is highly inclusive, permitting men, women, and young children to become Dhonds without any discrimination based on gender, caste, or religion. While historically associated with Hindu participants, the tradition has increasingly included Christian devotees over recent decades.

== Mythology ==
=== Legend of Lairai Devi ===
According to regional mythology, Lairai Devi is a prominent Shakti deity of Goa whose primary shrine is situated in the village of Shirgaon. Her foundational idol exists in a stone or grain-like (tandla) form, while her ceremonial festival idol is depicted as four-armed (chaturbhuj). Recognized as an avatar of a Vaishnavi deity, she is the eldest of seven sisters who share a single brother named Khetalo.

The fire-walking tradition originates from a legend where one of Lairai's sisters fell severely ill, prompting Lairai to vow to walk across burning embers to secure her recovery. Following this event, her local Shirgaon devotees walked through fire to demonstrate their absolute faith, establishing a customary practice that initially required no complex rituals. As the fame of the fire-walking ritual on the auspicious day of Vaishakh Shuddh Panchami spread, people from surrounding regions experiencing hardships began adopting the custom, eventually giving rise to the broader community of devotees known as Dhonds.

=== Distinction from Chaugules ===
A distinct hierarchy exists among the devotees of Lairai between the Chaugules and the Dhonds. The Chaugules are recognized as the original local devotees of the goddess from Shirgaon, and their ritual privileges are strictly passed down through hereditary lineage. Conversely, a Dhond can hail from Shirgaon or any other external locality. Broadly defined, any individual who participates in the fire-walking ritual who does not hold the hereditary lineage of a Chaugule is classified as a Dhond.

== Rituals ==
=== Fasting and taboos ===
The fire-walking festival occurs annually on Vaishakh Shuddh Panchami, taking place one month after a preceding seasonal festival. Participants are bound by strict rules (patro), which mandate a rigorous fast on the day of the festival. In the days leading up to the event, devotees observe a holy vow (vrat) during which their diet is limited exclusively to rice gruel (pej) and fruits, and they are required to maintain absolute abstinence from alcohol and sexual relations.

The duration of this preparatory vow depends on the participant's specific spiritual role:

- General Dhonds must strictly observe these restrictions for five days prior to the festival.
- Chaugules are required to maintain the vow for fifteen days prior.
- Priests who experience divine possession (avsar) and newly initiated Dhonds must observe the austerities for twenty-two days. During this extended period, they must only consume food cooked and served by individuals designated to handle the prayers and meal preparations.

=== Initiation and purification ===
For a new participant to be formally recognized, a priest must grant a ritual permission known as a kaul. Receiving this divine assurance officially establishes the individual as a devotee and permits them to enter the fire pit. On the day of the festival, all Dhonds must first perform a purificatory bath in a designated local pond before they are permitted to enter the Lairai temple or cross the homakund.

== Ceremonial practices and attire ==
=== Attire and accoutrements ===
During the festival rituals, every Dhond holds a specialized cane or stick (bet or vet) decorated with multi-colored tassels. The standard attire consists of a white dhoti (pudve), a white undershirt, and a ceremonial shawl (shelo) worn over the shoulder, though certain participants opt to wear a traditional nine-yard cloth (navvari kapad).

When proceeding to the fire pit, each Dhond wears a garland of jasmine buds around their neck and carries another in their right hand. Chaugules distinguish themselves visually by tying a white pheta around their heads. Upon the death of a Dhond, their ceremonial stick is ritually surrendered to the homakund at the subsequent annual festival.

=== Ceremonial dances ===
Before crossing the fire pit, the Dhonds assemble at the temple to chant praises of Lairai and perform a circular dance while striking their canes together. They also dance directly ahead of the deity (Saibin) when she journeys to the pond for her ritual bath, and they repeat the dance around the perimeter of the homakund before it is officially set ablaze.

Specific spiritual strictures govern female participation; women who are actively menstruating are barred from approaching the fire pit unless they undergo a purificatory bath consisting of five distinct washings (panchve udak). Traditional belief dictates that entering the fire without this purification will result in fatal burns.

== Beliefs regarding injuries ==
According to local tradition, if a Dhond trips, falls, or suffers burns and blisters on their feet while crossing the homakund, it is widely understood as a sign that they failed to properly maintain their religious vows and dietary strictures.

Devotees who sustain injuries are never taken to hospitals or medical doctors. Instead, they are housed directly within the Lairai temple, where priests treat the injuries by sprinkling the deity's sacred water (tirth) and placing holy flowers over the wounds. The injured Dhonds remain sheltered inside the temple complex until their wounds have completely healed.

== Geographical variations and parallels ==
Outside of its primary hub in Shirgaon, communities of Dhonds dedicated to respective local deities exist in other Goan villages, such as Mayem and Morjim. However, the specific act of walking through fire is not universal to all Dhond groups; for example, in the village of Komburfa, a religious fire-walking ritual is conducted over the homakund, but it takes place without the accompanying ceremonial stick dances.

Parallel religious traditions involving fire-walking have been documented globally in nations such as Fiji, Sri Lanka, and various Latin American countries. Individuals similarly fulfill sacred vows by taking fire baths or pouring burning embers over their bodies in these places.
