= Dhond =

Dhond may refer to:

- Dhond Abbasi, a tribe of northern Pakistan.
- Daund, a city in Maharashtra state, India.
- M. V. Dhond, Indian art critic
- Dhond (Goa), a traditional devotee of the deity Lairai of Shirgao, Goa
