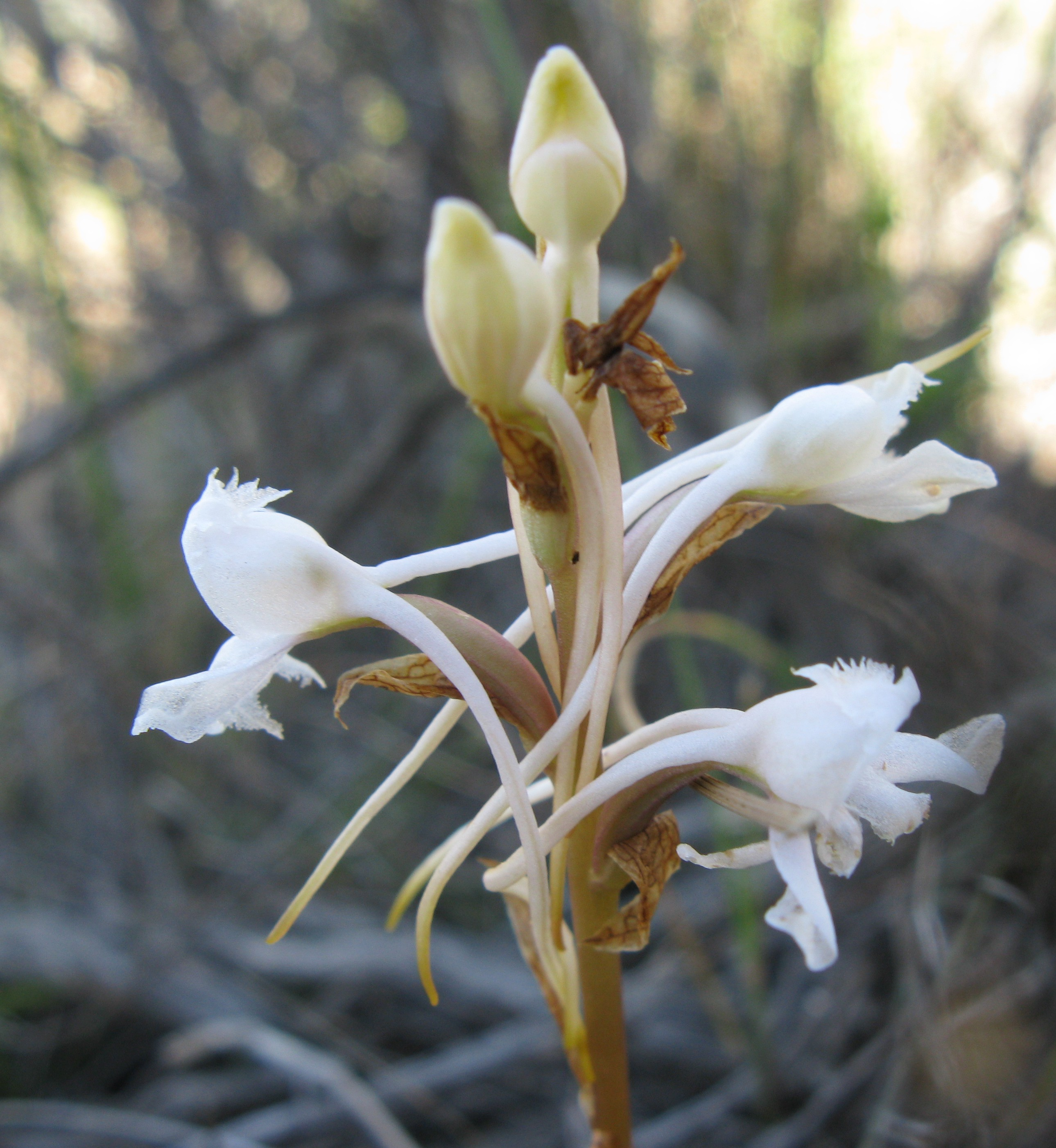
- Inflorescence

Scientific classification
- Kingdom: Plantae
- Clade: Tracheophytes
- Clade: Angiosperms
- Clade: Monocots
- Order: Asparagales
- Family: Orchidaceae
- Subfamily: Orchidoideae
- Genus: Satyrium
- Species: S. membranaceum

Binomial name
- Satyrium membranaceum Sw.

= Satyrium membranaceum =

Species of plant

Satyrium membranaceum is a species of ground orchid endemic to south and western Cape Province. It is a more gracile plant than most Satyriums, and the inflorescence is less dense than those of species such as Satyrium coriifolium or Satyrium carneum. Local populations of Satyrium membranaceum vary in colour from nearly red to pure white.

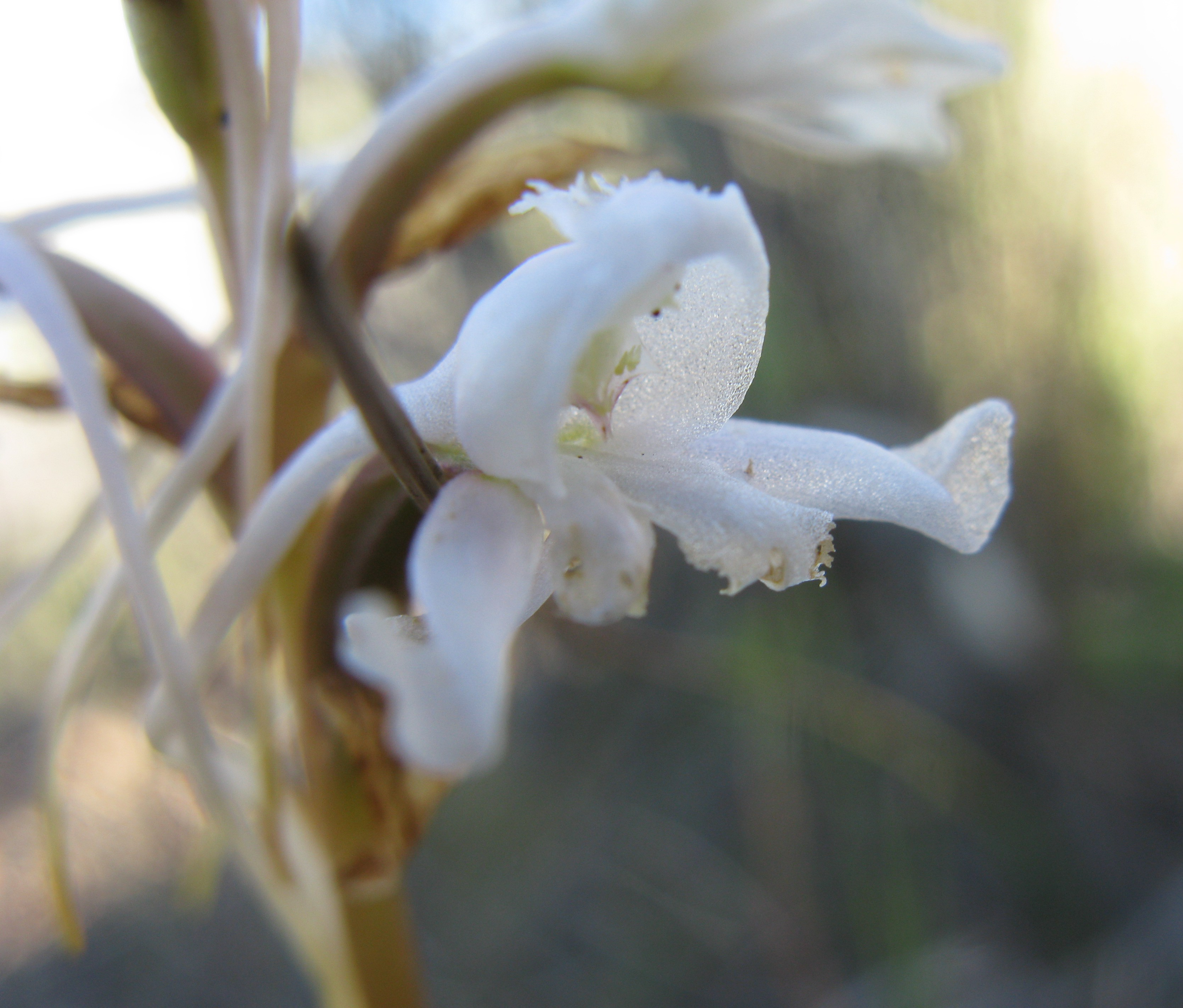
Detail of flower of white form
