= Satyrium =

Satyrium is the generic name of two groups of organisms and may refer to:

- Satyrium (butterfly), a genus of butterflies in the family Lycaenidae
- Satyrium (plant), a genus of plants in the family Orchidaceae
