= S. erectum =

S. erectum may refer to:

- Satyrium erectum, an orchid species endemic to southwestern and western Cape Province
- Sparganium erectum, a perennial plant species

== See also ==
- Erectum (disambiguation)
