= Yatra (disambiguation) =

Yatra is pilgrimage or procession in Hinduism. Yatra may also refer to:

== People ==
- Sebastián Yatra, Colombian singer

== Companies ==
- Yatra (company), travel website

== Films, TV, and music ==
- Yathra, 1985 Indian Malayalam-language film starring Mammootty
- Yatra (1986 TV series), 1986 Indian travel-based television series
- Yatra (album), 1994 album by Indian-American saxophonist Rudresh Mahanthappa
- Yatra (2002 TV program), 2002 Indian Hindi-language religious travel television program
- Yatra (2006 film), 2006 Indian Hindi-language film directed by Gautam Ghose
- Yatra (2019 film), 2019 Indian Telugu-language biopic about Y. S. Rajasekhara Reddy
  - Yatra 2, its 2024 sequel by Mahi V. Raghav

== Places ==
- Yatra, Navahrudak District, a village in Navahrudak District, Belarus

== See also ==
- Dhanu Yatra, theatre performance in Odisha, India
- Jatra (disambiguation)
- Zatra
- Yadaya, a Burmese magical ritual used to avert misfortune
