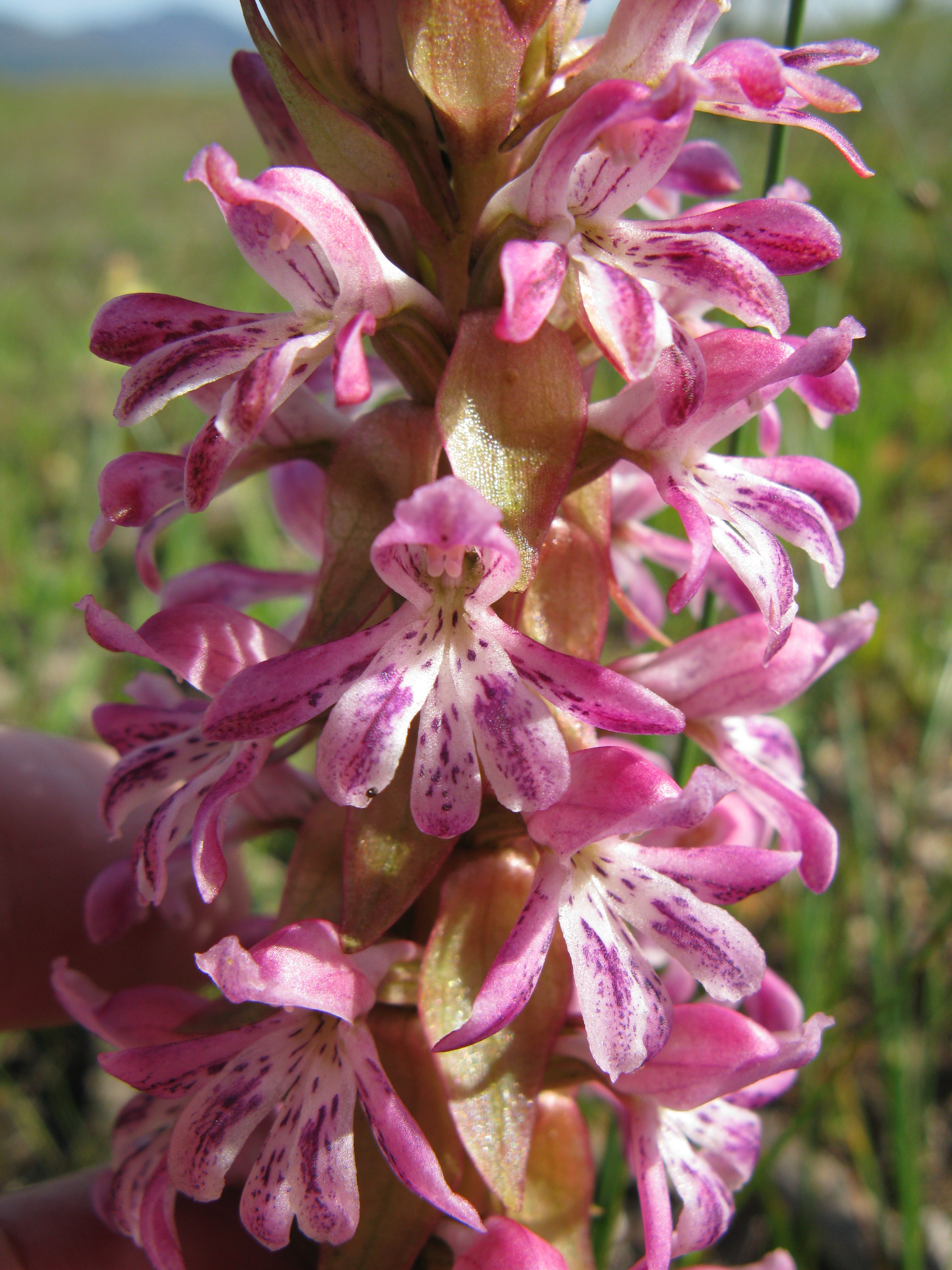
- Satyrium erectum detail

Scientific classification
- Kingdom: Plantae
- Clade: Tracheophytes
- Clade: Angiosperms
- Clade: Monocots
- Order: Asparagales
- Family: Orchidaceae
- Subfamily: Orchidoideae
- Tribe: Diseae
- Subtribe: Satyriinae; Schltr. Notizbl. Bot. Gart. Mus. Berlin-Dahlem 9: 568 (1926)

Genera
- Pachites; Satyrium

= Satyriinae =

Subtribe of flowering plants

Satyriinae is an orchid subtribe in the tribe Diseae.

== See also ==
- Taxonomy of the Orchidaceae
