= Vaishno Devi (disambiguation) =

Vaishno Devi is a Hindu goddess.

It may also refer to:

- Vaishno Devi Temple, a temple located in Katra, Jammu and Kashmir, India
  - Vaishno Devi Temple stampede, 2022
  - Shri Mata Vaishno Devi Katra railway station
  - Shri Mata Vaishno Devi Assembly constituency
  - Shri Mata Vaishno Devi University
- Vaishnodevi Temple, Rourkela, another temple located in Rourkela, Odisha, India
- Vaishnodevi Square metro station, Nagpur Metro station in Nagpur, India
- Jai Maa Vaishno Devi (1994 film), 1994 Indian Hindi-language devotional film
- Shri Mata Vaishno Devi Shrine Board, The statutory and autonomous body responsible for the management, administration, and governance of Holy Shrine of Vaishno Devi
- Vaishno Devi Sacred Grove, A Grove

== See also ==
- Vaishnavi (disambiguation)
- Vaishno Academy
