= Floral symmetry =

Shape of flowers

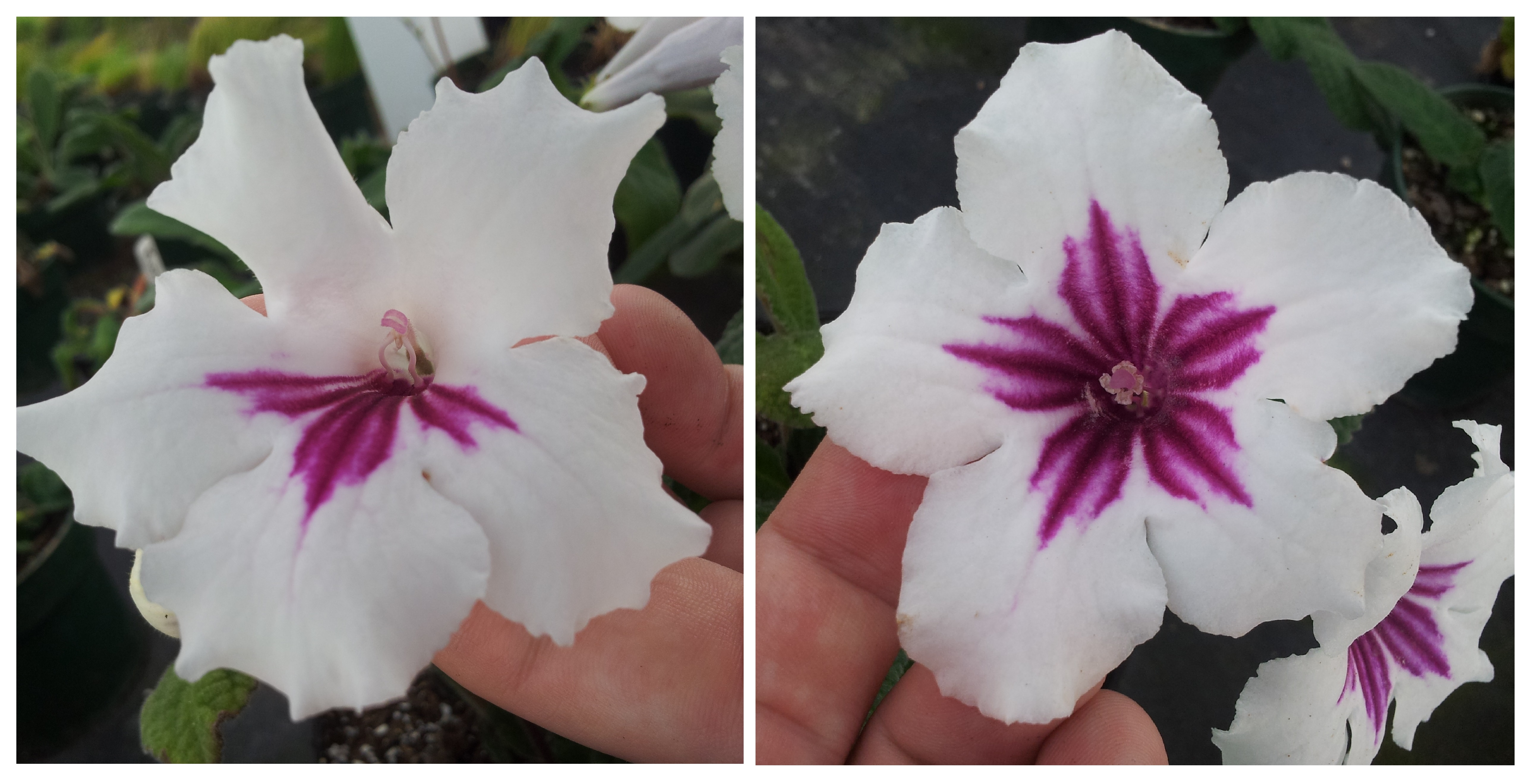
[Left] Normal Streptocarpus flower (zygomorphic or mirror-symmetric), and [right] peloric (radially symmetric) flower on the same plant

Floral symmetry describes whether, and how, a flower, in particular its perianth, can be divided into two or more identical or mirror-image parts.

Uncommonly, flowers may have no axis of symmetry at all, typically because their parts are spirally arranged.

== Actinomorphic ==
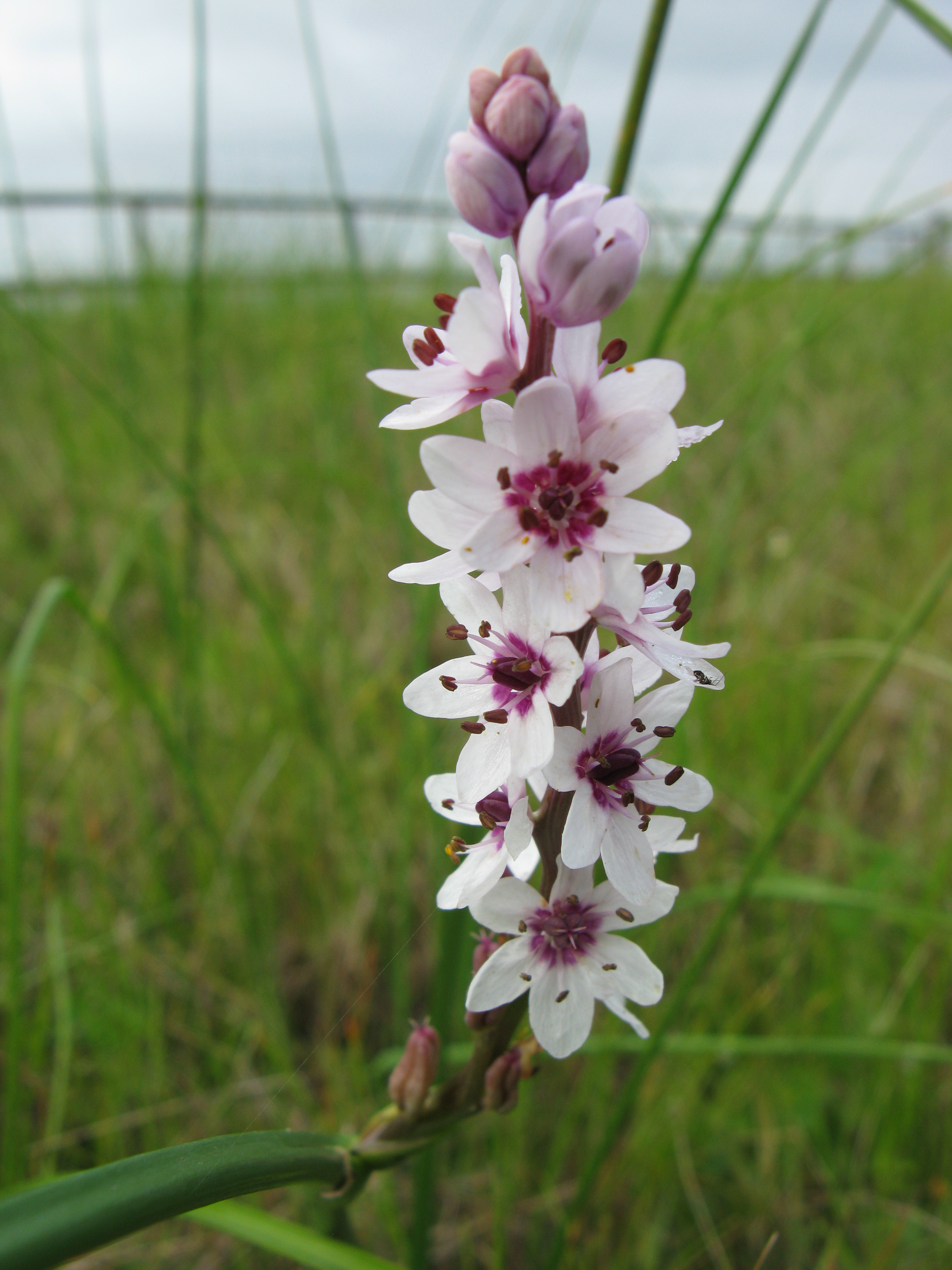
Wurmbea stricta, its tepals in actinomorphic arrangement

Most flowers are actinomorphic ("star shaped", "radial"), meaning they can be divided into three or more identical sectors which are related to each other by rotation about the center of the flower. Typically, each sector might contain one tepal or one petal and one sepal and so on. It may or may not be possible to divide the flower into symmetrical halves by the same number of longitudinal planes passing through the axis: oleander is an example of a flower without such mirror planes. Actinomorphic flowers are also called radially symmetrical or regular flowers. Other examples of actinomorphic flowers are the lily (Lilium, Liliaceae) and the buttercup (Ranunculus, Ranunculaceae).

== Zygomorphic ==
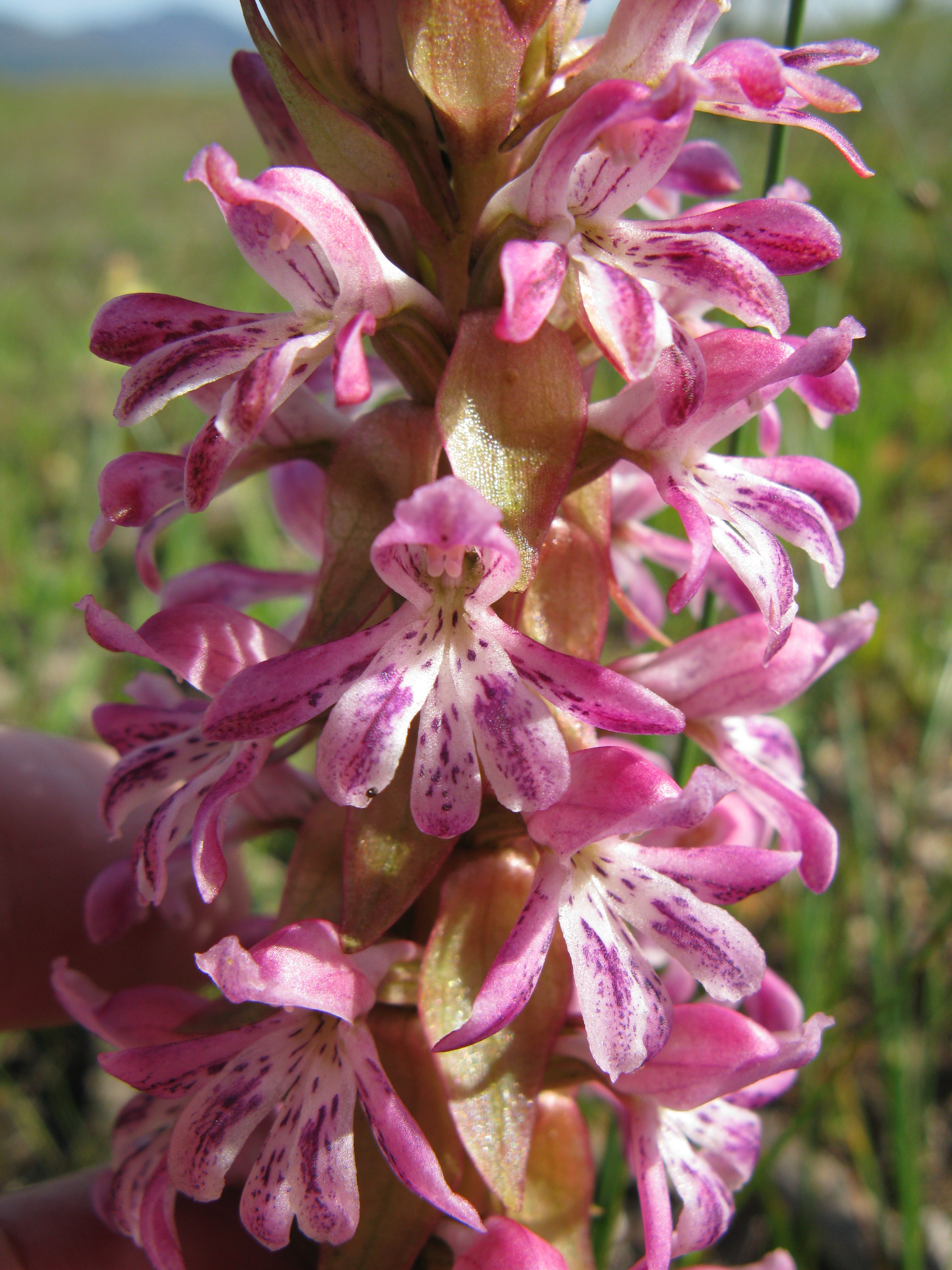
Satyrium carneum. Ground orchid with typical zygomorphic floral anatomy

Zygomorphic ("yoke shaped", "bilateral" – from the Greek ζυγόν, zygon, yoke, and μορφή, morphe, shape) flowers can be divided by only a single plane into two mirror-image halves, much like a yoke or a person's face. Examples are orchids and the flowers of most members of the Lamiales (e.g., Scrophulariaceae and Gesneriaceae). Some authors prefer the term monosymmetry or bilateral symmetry. The asymmetry allows pollen to be deposited in specific locations on pollinating insects and this specificity can result in evolution of new species.

Globally and within individual networks, zygomorphic flowers are a minority. Plants with zygomorphic flowers have smaller number of visitor species compared to those with actinomorphic flowers. Sub-networks of plants with zygomorphic flowers share greater connectance, greater asymmetry and lower coextinction robustness for both the plants and the visitor species. Plant taxa with zygomorphic flowers can have a greater risk of extinction due to pollinator decline.

== Asymmetry ==
A few plant species have flowers lacking any symmetry, and therefore having a "handedness". Examples: Valeriana officinalis and Canna indica.

== Differences ==
Actinomorphic flowers are a basal angiosperm character; zygomorphic flowers are a derived character that has evolved many times.

Some familiar and seemingly actinomorphic so-called flowers, such as those of daisies and dandelions (Asteraceae), and most species of Protea, are actually clusters of tiny (not necessarily actinomorphic) flowers arranged into a roughly radially symmetric inflorescence of the form known as a head, capitulum, or pseudanthium.

== Peloria ==
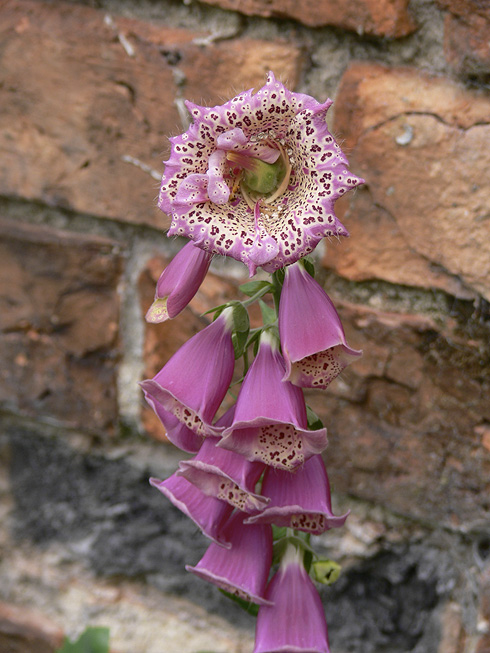
Digitalis purpurea (common foxglove) displaying an aberrant peloric terminal flower and normal zygomorphic flowers

Peloria or a peloric flower is the aberration in which a plant that normally produces zygomorphic flowers produces actinomorphic flowers instead. This aberration can be developmental, or it can have a genetic basis: the CYCLOIDEA gene controls floral symmetry. Peloric Antirrhinum plants have been produced by knocking out this gene. Many modern cultivars of Sinningia speciosa ("gloxinia") have been bred to have peloric flowers as they are larger and showier than the normally zygomorphic flowers of this species.

Charles Darwin explored peloria in Antirrhinum (snapdragon) while researching the inheritance of floral characteristics for his The Variation of Animals and Plants Under Domestication. Later research, using Digitalis purpurea, showed that his results were largely in line with Mendelian theory.

== See also ==
- Floral morphology
- Patterns in nature
- Phyllotaxis
- Symmetry in biology
- Whorl (botany)

== Bibliography ==
- Craene, Louis P. Ronse De (2010), Floral diagrams: an aid to understanding flower morphology and evolution, Cambridge: Cambridge University Press, ISBN 978-0-521-49346-8
- Darwin, Charles (1868). The Variation of Animals and Plants Under Domestication. Vol. II. London: John Murray.
- Endress, P. K. (February 2001). "Evolution of floral symmetry". Curr. Opin. Plant Biol. 4 (1): 86–91. Bibcode:2001COPB....4...86E. doi:10.1016/S1369-5266(00)00140-0. PMID 11163173.
- Neal P. R.; Dafni A.; Giurfa M. (1998). "Floral symmetry and its role in plant-pollinator systems: terminology, distribution, and hypotheses". Annu Rev Ecol Syst. 29 (1): 345–373. Bibcode:1998AnRES..29..345N. doi:10.1146/annurev.ecolsys.29.1.345. JSTOR 221712.
