= Vaishno Devi Sacred Grove =

Indian forest

- Location: Gangolihat, Uttarakhand, India
- Nearest city: Pithoragarh
- Area: 30 ha (74 acres)
- Governing body: Gangola community

The Vaishno Devi Sacred Grove is a protected patch of relict virgin forest located in the Kumaon Himalaya region of Uttarakhand, India. Spanning an area of 30 hectares, the forest is more than 100 years old and represents a significant site for both indigenous cultural heritage and biodiversity conservation.

== Geography and location ==
The grove is situated at Jakhani, located along the Pithoragarh–Gangolihat roadway in the Pithoragarh District. It sits at an elevation of 1,938 meters above sea level, at the geographical coordinates of 29°37.801′N, 080°03.410′E.

== Cultural and religious significance ==
The preservation of the Vaishno Devi Sacred Grove is driven entirely by the religious beliefs of the local community, known as the 'Gangola' of Gangolihat. The community believes that their local deity resides within this forest, and it houses a small temple dedicated to Vaishno Devi. Because of its sacred status, human interference in the forest is heavily restricted. The local community strictly prohibits grazing, tree cutting, poaching, and the collection of non-timber forest products within the grove. Furthermore, many of the trees found in the grove are revered as sacred species and are deeply interwoven with the region's cultural expressions, frequently appearing in local folk music, dance, and poetry.

== Ecology and biodiversity ==
The vegetation of the grove is primarily classified as a sub-tropical evergreen forest, though it also contains a mix of sub-temperate and temperate plant elements. The primary forest canopy is composed of tree species such as Quercus sp., Cedrus deodara, Aesculus indica, Bauhinia variegata, and Rhododendron arboreum. These trees play a crucial ecological role in nutrient cycling and ensuring water balance in the soil. The grove is notable for its high floristic diversity, acting as a natural refugium. Researchers have identified 112 plant species belonging to 86 genera and 39 families within the area. This includes:

- 56 species of aromatic and medicinal plants
- 14 species of wild edible plants
- 12 species of fodder and forage plants
- 6 species of oil-yielding plants
- 4 species of timber-yielding plants

The dense canopy supports a thriving microhabitat that includes profuse growths of mosses and other bryophytes, with tree trunks and branches covered in epiphytic angiosperms and pteridophytes. The grove ensures the survival of several endangered plant taxa, such as Valeriana jatamansi, Delphinium denudatum, and Thalictrum foliolosum. It is also home to various orchids (e.g., Satyrium nepalense, Eulophia herbacea), climbers (e.g., Rubia cordifolia), lianas (Bauhinia vahlii), and succulents (Agave sp., Aloe sp.).
