= Vaishnavi =

Vaishnavi may refer to:

== Hindu deities ==
- Vaishno Devi, also known as Vaishnavi
- Vaishnavi (Matrika goddess), Hindu deity
- Durga or Vaishnavi, worshipped as an aspect of Mahadevi
- An epithet of Lakshmi, the goddess of prosperity and consort of Vishnu

== People ==
- Vaishnavi Adkar (born 2004), Indian tennis player
- Vaishnavi Aravind (fl. 1988–1997), Indian film actress in Tamil and Malayalam movies
- Vaishnavi Chaitanya (born 4 1994), Indian actress in Telugu films
- Vaishnavi Dhanraj (born 1988), Indian Hindi television and film actress
- Vaishnavi Ganatra, 21st century Indian actress
- Vaishnavi Macdonald (fl. 1988–present) Indian Hindi television and film actress
- Vaishnave Mahesh, Indian cricketer
- Vaishnavi Patel (born 1995 or 1996), American novelist and lawyer
- Vaishnavi Phalke (born 2003), Indian field hockey player
- Vaishnavi Powar (born 2006), Indian kho kho player
- Vaishnavi Saikumar, 21st century Indian actress in Malayalam television
- Vaishnavi Sharma (born 2005), Indian cricketer
- Vaishnavi (Tamil actress) (1986–2006), Indian Tamil television actress
- Naga Vaishnavi (2000–2010), child kidnapped and murdered by relatives of her father's first wife
- Rughonath Vaishnavi (died 1996), Indian politician
- Vijay Vaishnavi, Indian computer scientist

== See also ==
- Vaishnavee, a 2018 Sri Lankan film
- Vaishnavism, a major branch of Hinduism
- Vaishno Devi (disambiguation)
