= Jatra =

Jatra may refer to:

- Jatra (theatre), a folk-theatre form of Bengali theatre
- Jatra (2016 film), 2016 Nepalese movie
- Jatra (Maharashtra), village festivals in the state of Maharashtra, India
- Jatra (Nepal), a street festival by the Newars
- Jatra (Odisha), an Odia theater performance in Odisha, India
- Yatra and Zatra, two Hindu pilgrimage festivals
- Jatra: Hyalagaad Re Tyalagaad, a 2005 Indian Marathi-language comedy film

== See also ==
- Yatra (disambiguation)
- Jatara, a town in Madhya Pradesh, India
  - Jatara (Vidhan Sabha constituency)
- Jathara, a 1980 Indian film
- Ratha Yatra, a Hindu festival
