= Zatra =

Konkani language term

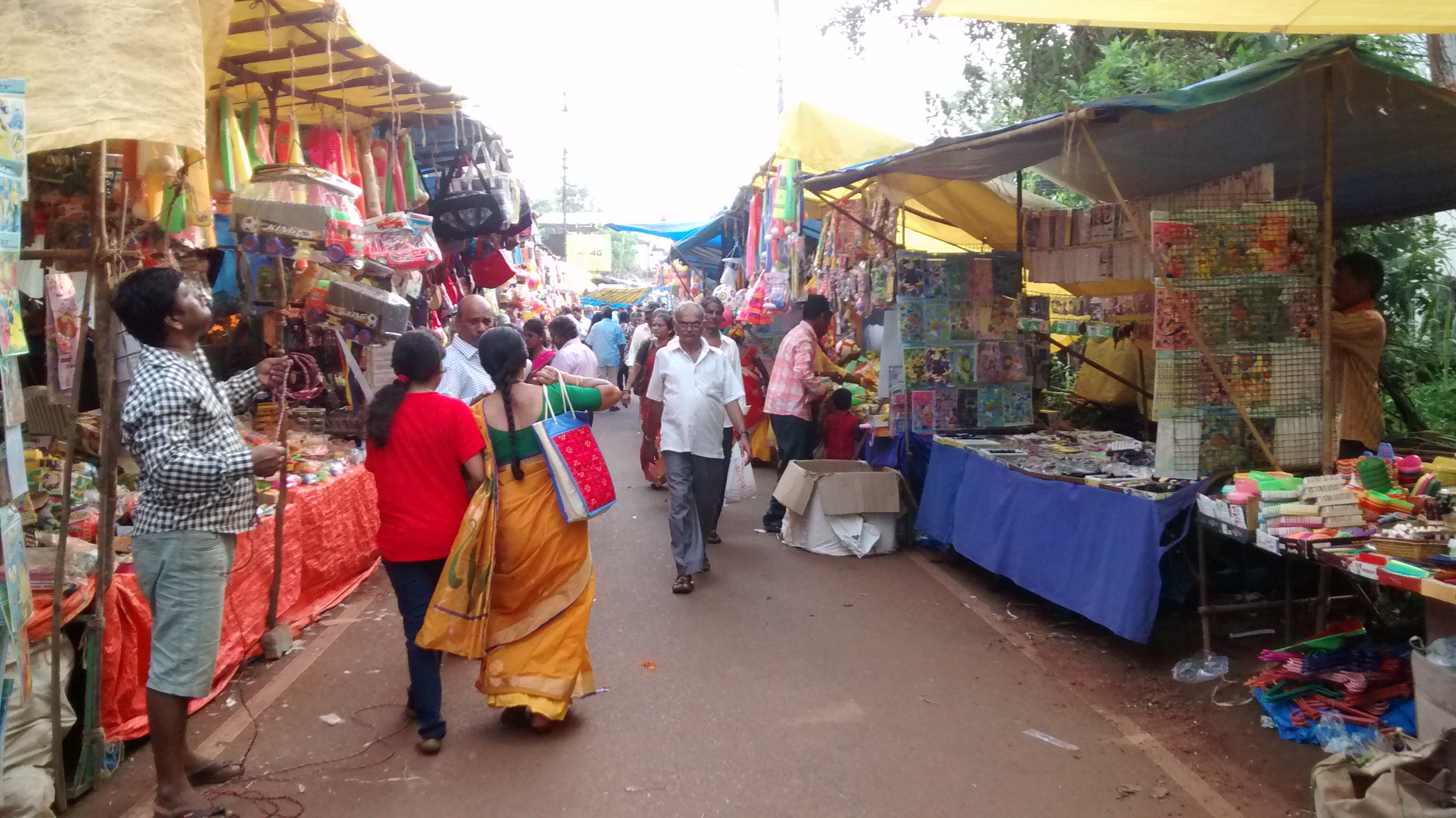
- Zatra in Shiroda, Goa
- Observed by: Goan Hindus
- Observances: Deity Procession
- Date: October - March
- Frequency: Annual
- Related to: Diwali

Zatra is the Konkani language term for the pilgrimage festivals celebrated at Hindu temples in Goa, India; the equivalent of yatra and jatra. In Maharashtra the alternative term Urus is used as well.

During the zatra, the idol(s) or murtis of the Hindu deity or deities are taken out on special procession either in a "Palkhi" (sort of a Palanquin) or in a large, multi-storied chariot called the Rath.

Traditionally, every temple observes this festival once a year on the traditional day. All zatras usually occur after Diwali in October and continues until the Shigmo or Holi festival in March.

The most famous zatra of Goa is that of the temple of the Hindu deity Lairai at Shirgao, a place located roughly 30 km away from Panaji when people walk on burning coals with bare legs and that of deity Goddess Shantadurga at Village Fatorpa in Quepem Taluka; approx 50 km from Panaji and 18 km from Madgao. These Zatras can be compared to Mela (Hindi) for its other commercial and entertainment activities.

Popular snacks sold and consumed during zatra are ladu which is the local name for laddu and khaje (खाजें) which are fried chickpea flour sticks dipped in a jaggery and sesame mixture.

Khaje (खाजें) - A popular snack in Goa zatra

Also occurring during the zatra is the phenomenon of possession, usually but not exclusively of women, by the spirit of the deity; this is called Bhar, whereby they act as oracles and claim to predict future events.

Outside of Goa, the most famous zatra is the Rath Yatra of the Jagannath Temple in Puri, Odisha, India which contributed the word juggernaut to the English language.

== See also ==
- Jatra (Maharashtra)
