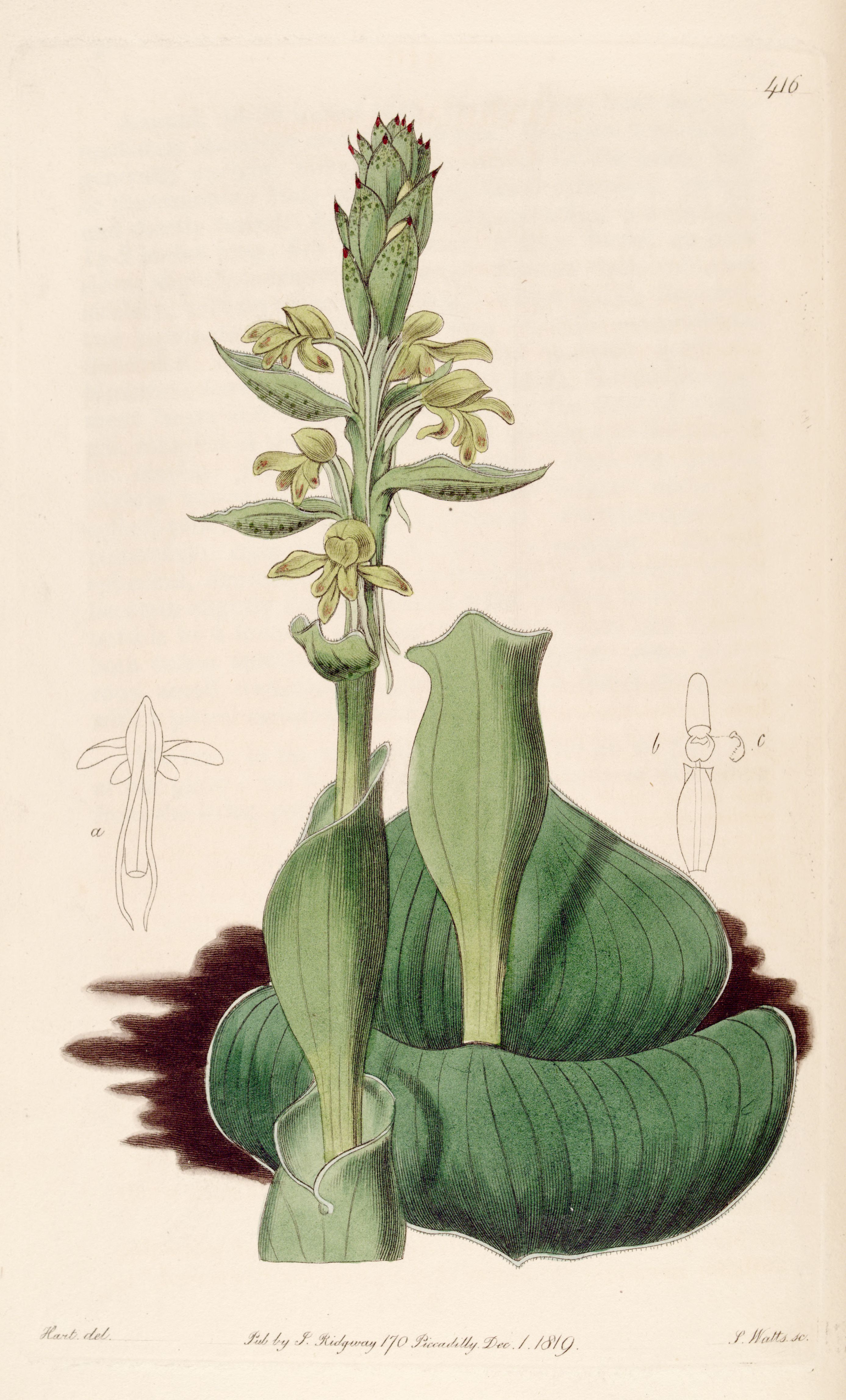
- Illustration of Satyrium bicorne

Scientific classification
- Kingdom: Plantae
- Clade: Tracheophytes
- Clade: Angiosperms
- Clade: Monocots
- Order: Asparagales
- Family: Orchidaceae
- Subfamily: Orchidoideae
- Genus: Satyrium
- Species: S. bicorne

Binomial name
- Satyrium bicorne (L.) Thunb.

Synonyms
- Orchis bicornis L. (basionym); Satyrium cucullatum Sw.; Diplectrum cucullatum (Sw.) Pers.; Diplectrum cuculliflorum Salisb.

= Satyrium bicorne =

Species of plant

Satyrium bicorne is a species of orchid endemic to southwestern Cape Province. It is the type species of the genus Satyrium.
