= Satyrium buchananii =

Scientific classification
- Kingdom: Plantae
- Clade: Tracheophytes
- Clade: Angiosperms
- Clade: Monocots
- Order: Asparagales
- Family: Orchidaceae
- Subfamily: Orchidoideae
- Genus: Satyrium
- Species: S. buchananii

Binomial name
- Satyrium buchananii Schltr.

Species of plant

Satyrium buchananii is a species of ground orchid occurring from Tanzania to Southern tropical Africa. Like other Satyriums, it is a tuber geophyte.
