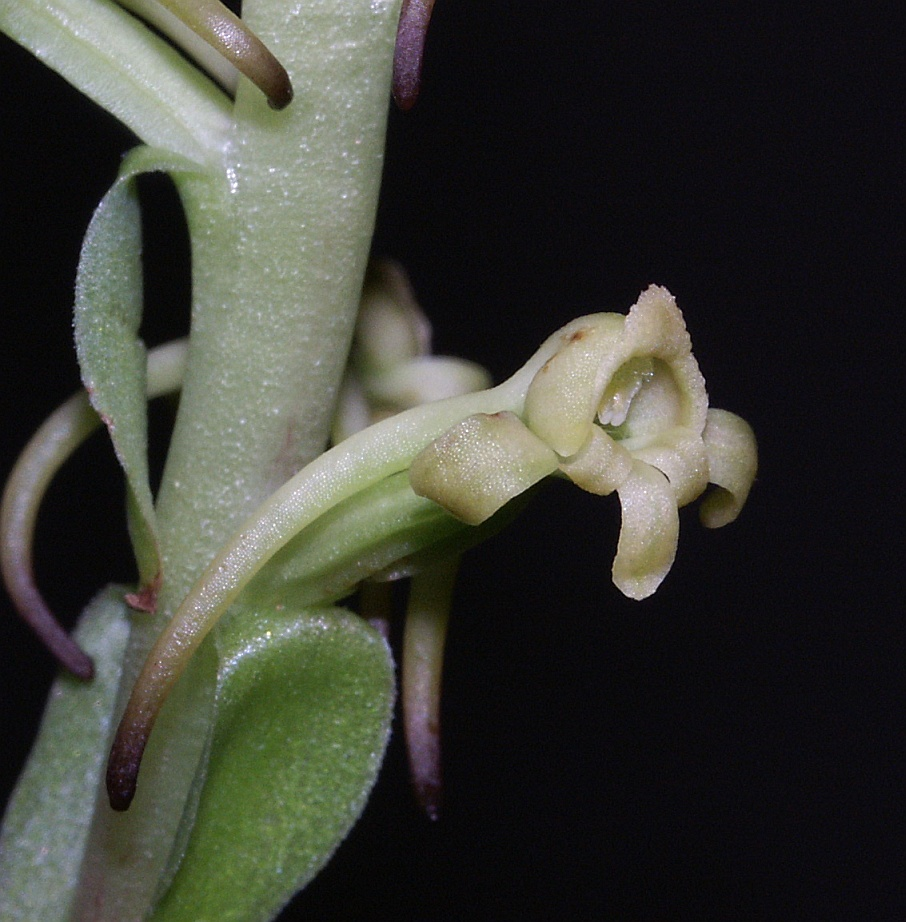
- Flower

Scientific classification
- Kingdom: Plantae
- Clade: Tracheophytes
- Clade: Angiosperms
- Clade: Monocots
- Order: Asparagales
- Family: Orchidaceae
- Subfamily: Orchidoideae
- Genus: Satyrium
- Species: S. odorum

Binomial name
- Satyrium odorum Sond.

= Satyrium odorum =

Species of plant

Satyrium odorum is a species of orchid endemic to southwestern Cape Province.
