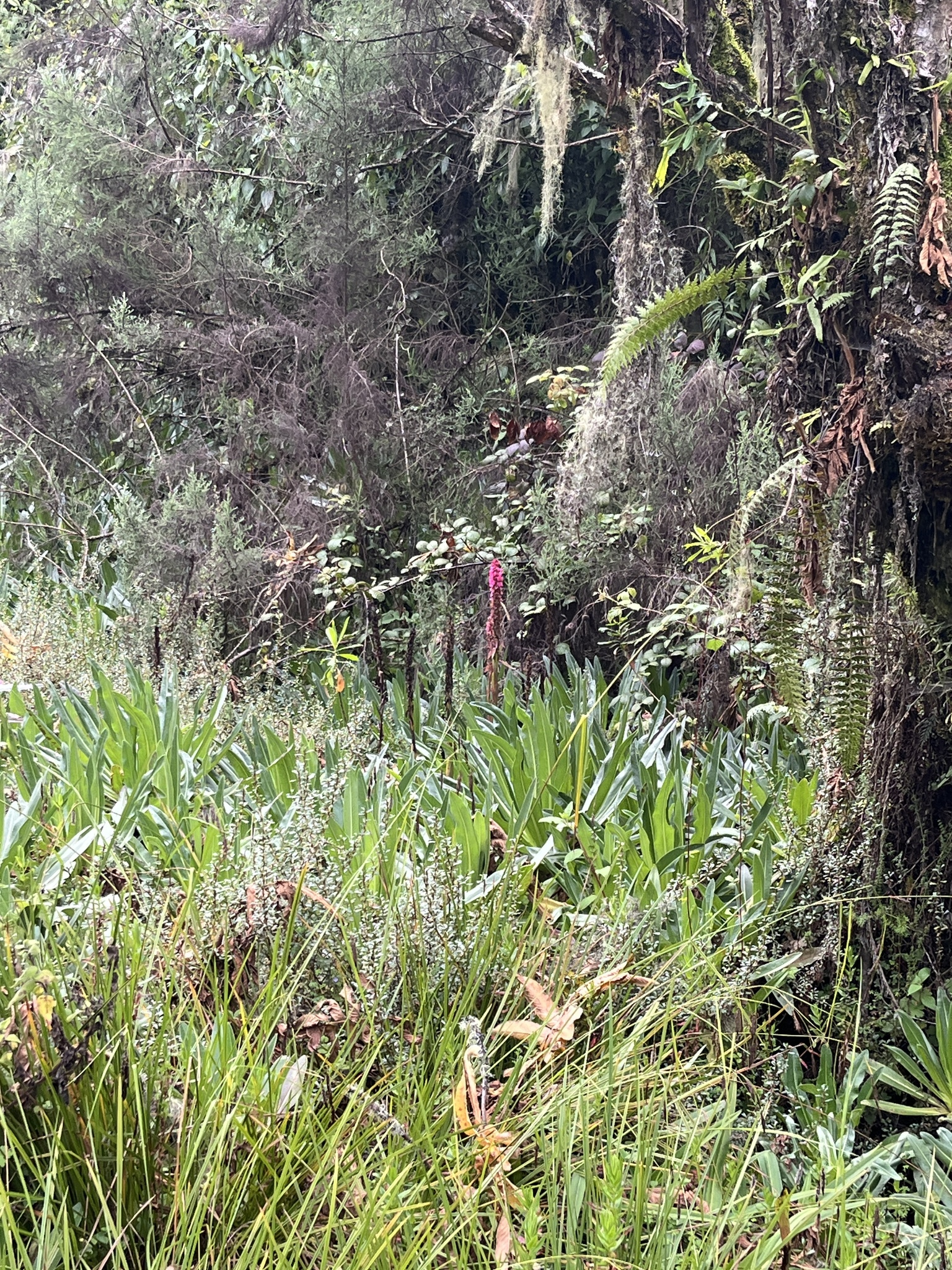
- Flower

Scientific classification
- Kingdom: Plantae
- Clade: Tracheophytes
- Clade: Angiosperms
- Clade: Monocots
- Order: Asparagales
- Family: Orchidaceae
- Subfamily: Orchidoideae
- Genus: Satyrium
- Species: S. crassicaule

Binomial name
- Satyrium crassicaule Rendle

= Satyrium crassicaule =

Species of plant

Satyrium crassicaule is a species of orchid widespread in Sub-Saharan Africa from 1850 msl and above. The native range of this species is Burundi, Cameroon, DR Congo, Ethiopia, Kenya, Malawi, Nigeria, Rwanda, Tanzania, Uganda and Zambia.
