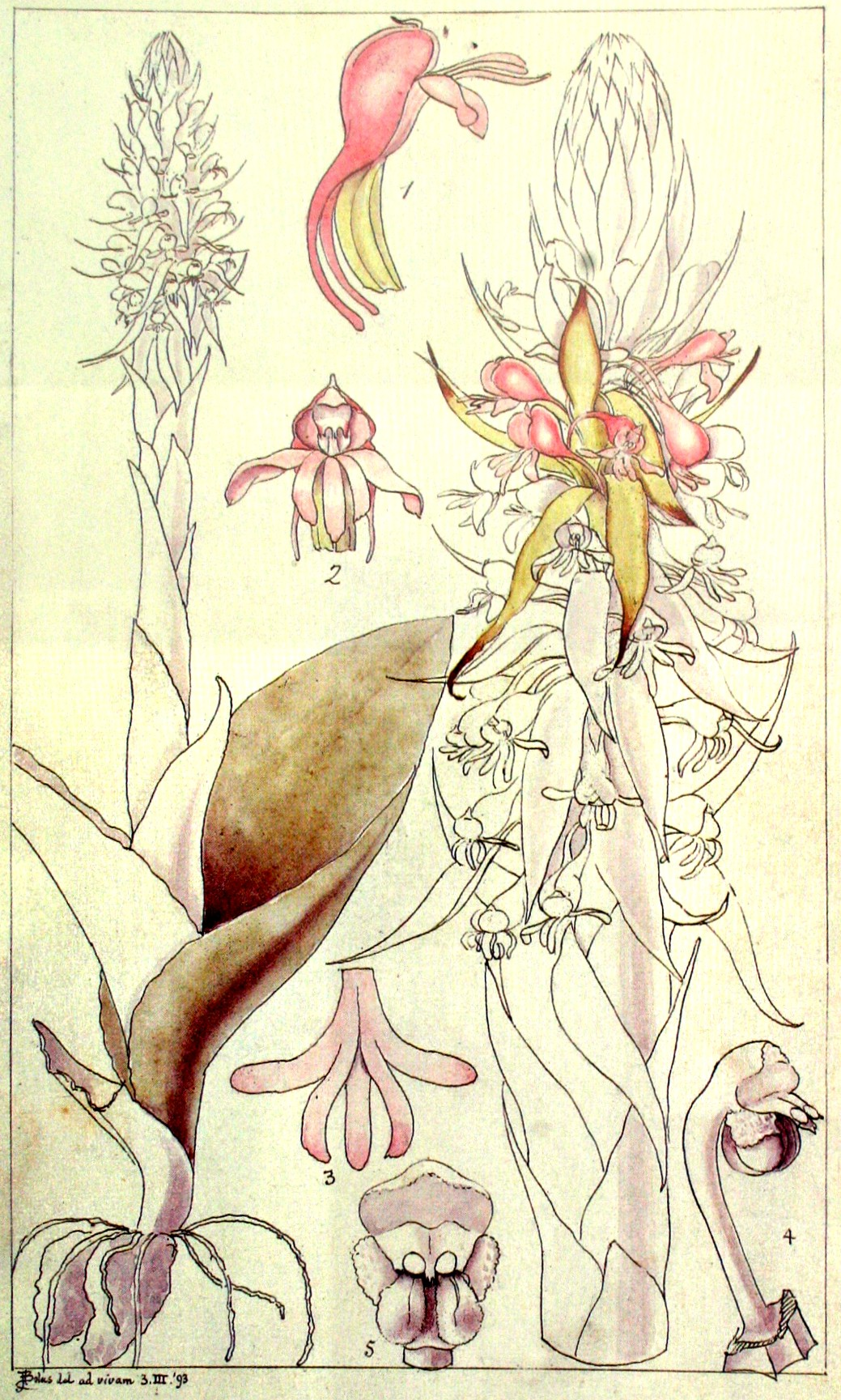
- Illustration

Scientific classification
- Kingdom: Plantae
- Clade: Tracheophytes
- Clade: Angiosperms
- Clade: Monocots
- Order: Asparagales
- Family: Orchidaceae
- Subfamily: Orchidoideae
- Genus: Satyrium
- Species: S. macrophyllum

Binomial name
- Satyrium macrophyllum Lindl.

Synonyms
- Satyrium buchananii Rolfe; Satyrium cheirophorum Rolfe; Satyrium speciosum Rolfe; Satyrium morrumbalaensis De Wild.; Satyrium brachyrhynchum Schltr.

= Satyrium macrophyllum =

Species of plant

Satyrium macrophyllum is a species of orchid occurring from Kenya to South Africa.
