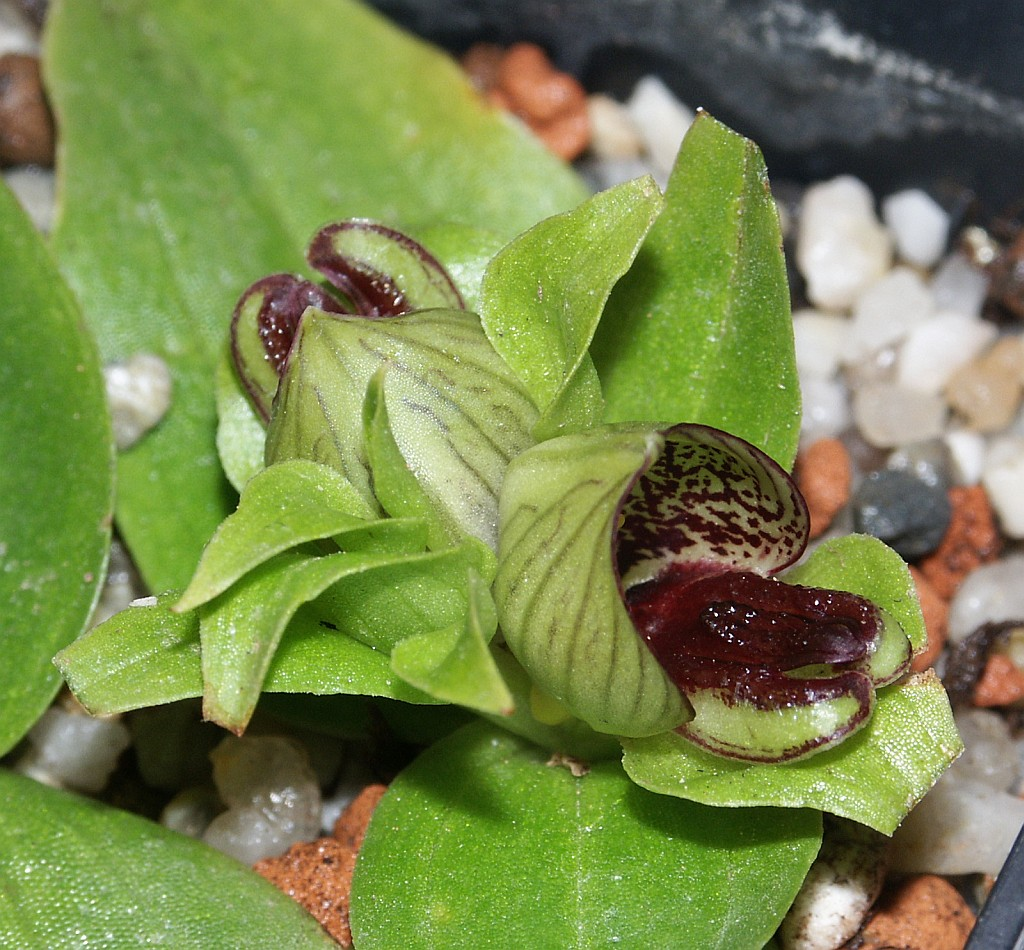
- Satyrium pumilum
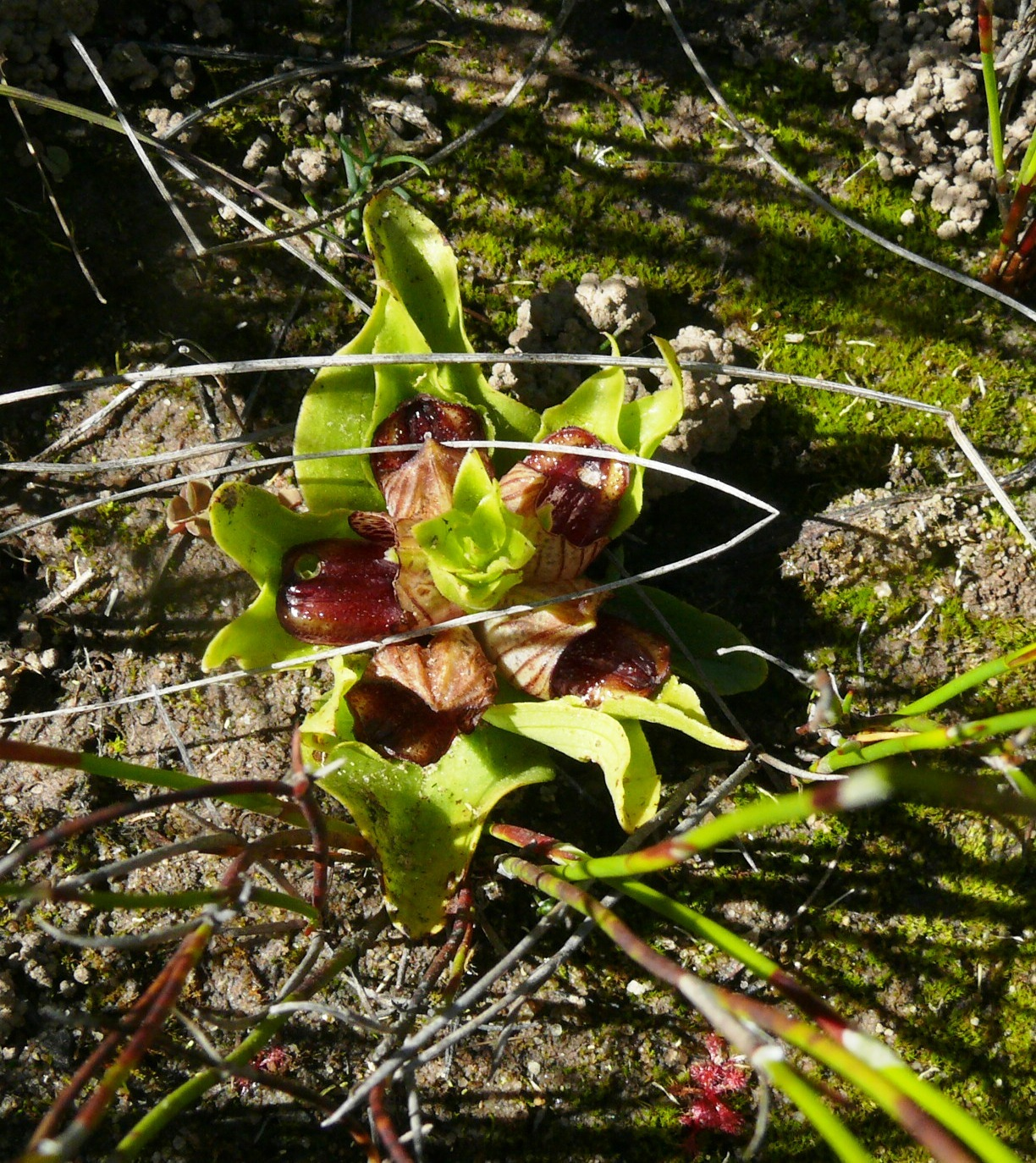

Conservation status
- Least Concern (SANBI Red List)

Scientific classification
- Kingdom: Plantae
- Clade: Tracheophytes
- Clade: Angiosperms
- Clade: Monocots
- Order: Asparagales
- Family: Orchidaceae
- Subfamily: Orchidoideae
- Genus: Satyrium
- Species: S. pumilum

Binomial name
- Satyrium pumilum Thunb.

Synonyms
- Diplectrum pumilum (Thunb.) Pers.; Aviceps pumila (Thunb.) Lindl.

= Satyrium pumilum =

Species of plant

Satyrium pumilum, also called the carrion-flower orchid, is a species of orchid endemic to the Northern and Western Cape provinces of South Africa. It mimics carrion that attracts specific species of pollinating flesh flies.
