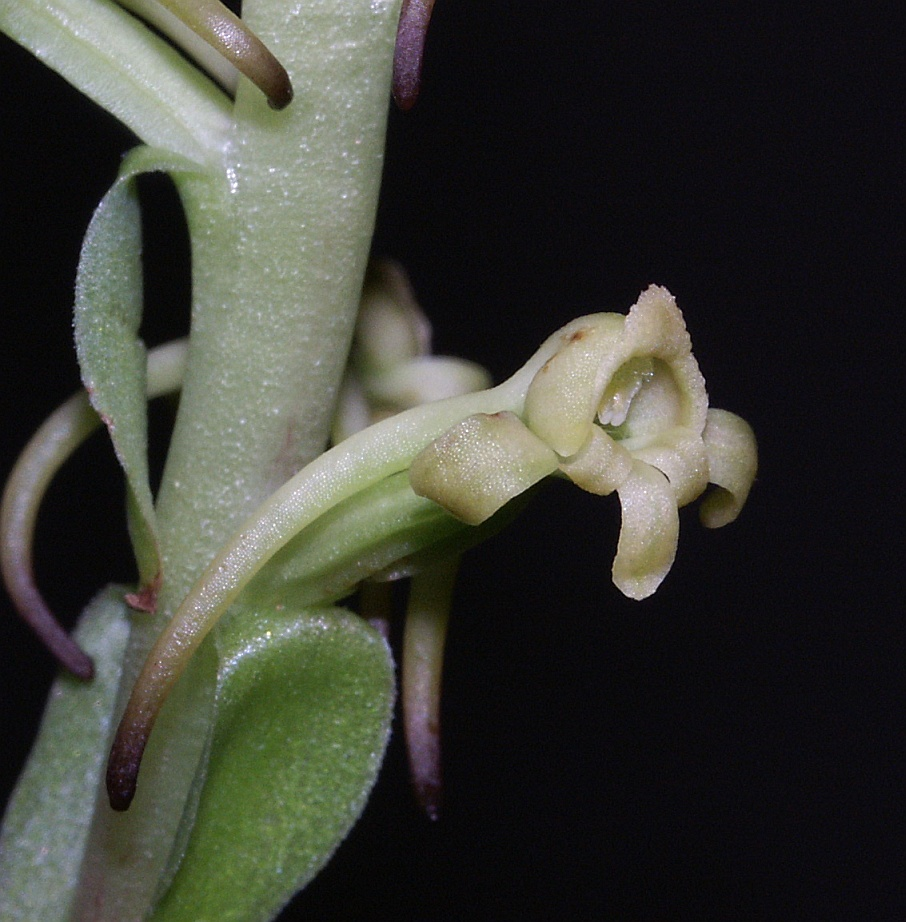
- Satyrium odorum

Scientific classification
- Kingdom: Plantae
- Clade: Tracheophytes
- Clade: Angiosperms
- Clade: Monocots
- Order: Asparagales
- Family: Orchidaceae
- Subfamily: Orchidoideae
- Tribe: Orchideae
- Subtribe: Orchidinae
- Genus: Satyrium; Sw.

Species
- 91, see text

Synonyms
- Aviceps Lindl. Diplectrum Pers. Hipporkis Thouars; Satyridium Lindl.

= Satyrium (plant) =

Genus of plants in the orchid family

Satyrium is a genus of orchid. The Kew plant list for 2010 listed 85 full species as accepted, ignoring synonyms, subspecies and hybrids etc. About ten were still unresolved at the time. Most of the species occur in sub-Saharan Africa and Madagascar. The ranges of four species extend to Asia, mainly in India and Sri Lanka. Hybridization occurs between several species, complicating molecular phylogenetic studies, especially those relying on mitochondrial and chloroplast DNA sequences.

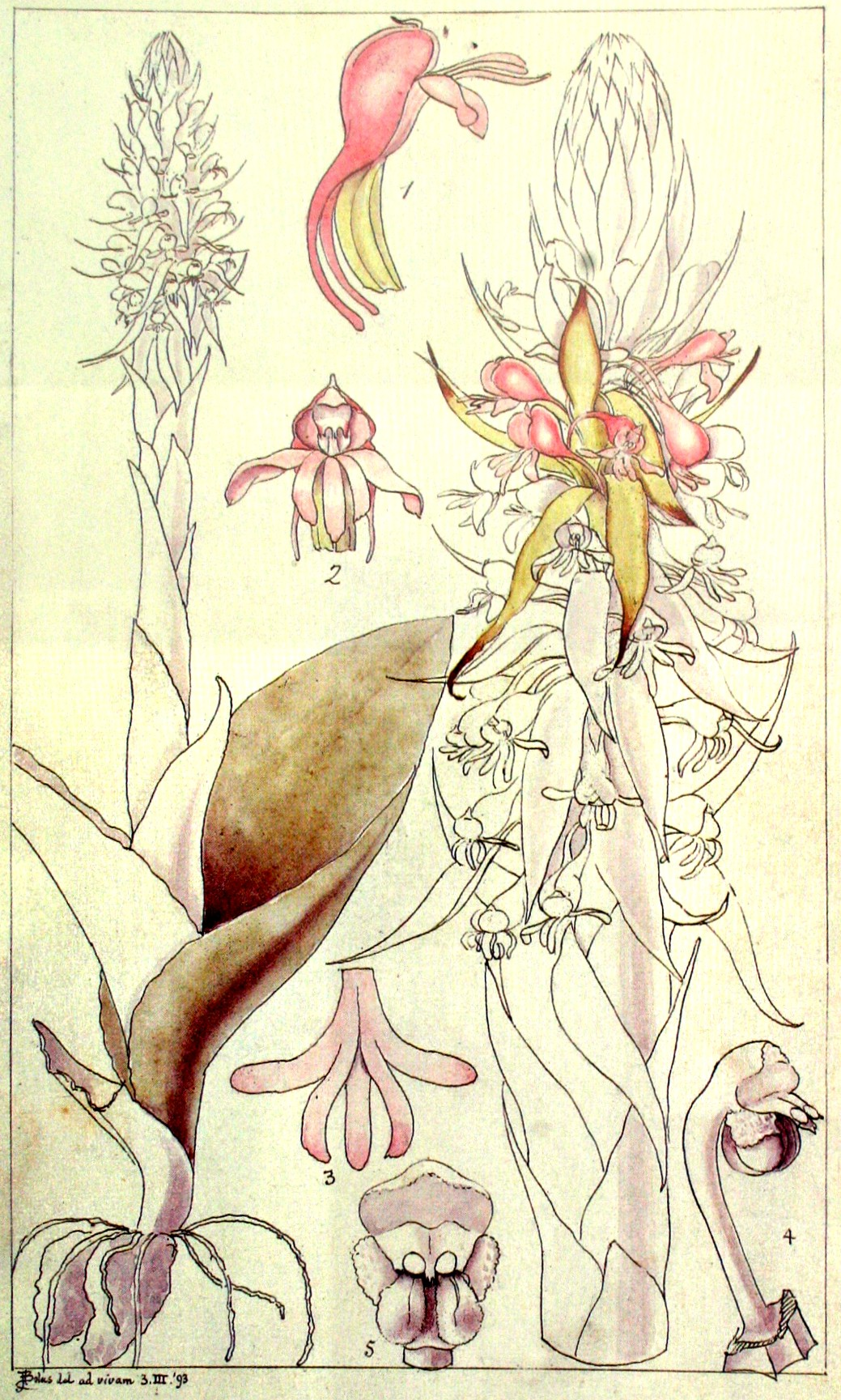
Satyrium macrophyllum Pencil and watercolour by Harry Blus

The genus most closely related to Satyrium is presumed to be Pachites, which together with Satyrium makes up the subtribe Satyriinae of the Diseae. Historically other species with helmet-shaped flowers e.g. Aceras, Chamorchis and Platanthera, often were included in the genus Satyrium, but far from belonging in the same genus, they no longer are included even within the Satyriinae, but within the tribe Orchideae. In a 2015 classification of Orchidaceae, Satyrium itself was placed in the subtribe Orchidinae.

== Currently accepted species of Satyrium ==
- Satyrium aberrans Summerh.
- Satyrium aciculare van der Niet & P.J.Cribb
- Satyrium acuminatum Lindl.
- Satyrium aethiopicum Summerh.
- Satyrium afromontanum la Croix & P.J.Cribb
- Satyrium amblyosaccos Schltr.
- Satyrium amoenum (Thouars) A.Rich.
- Satyrium anomalum Schltr.
- Satyrium baronii Schltr.
- Satyrium bicallosum Thunb.
- Satyrium bicorne (L.) Thunb.
- Satyrium brachypetalum A.Rich.
- Satyrium bracteatum (L.f.) Thunb.
- Satyrium breve Rolfe
- Satyrium buchananii Schltr.
- Satyrium candidum Lindl.
- Satyrium carneum (Dryand.) Sims
- Satyrium carsonii Rolfe
- Satyrium cernuiflorum Castañeda-Zárate & van der Niet
- Satyrium chlorocorys Rchb.f. ex Rolfe
- Satyrium compactum Summerh.
- Satyrium comptum Summerh.
- Satyrium confusum Summerh.
- Satyrium coriifolium Sw.
- Satyrium coriophoroides A.Rich.
- Satyrium crassicaule Rendle
- Satyrium cristatum Sond.
- Satyrium ecalcaratum Schltr.
- Satyrium elongatum Rolfe
- Satyrium erectum Sw.
- Satyrium fimbriatum Summerh.
- Satyrium flavum la Croix
- Satyrium foliosum Sw.
- Satyrium hallackii Bolus
- Satyrium humile Lindl.
- Satyrium johnsonii Rolfe
- Satyrium kermesinum Kraenzl.
- Satyrium kitimboense Kraenzl.
- Satyrium ligulatum Lindl.
- Satyrium liltvedianum van der Niet
- Satyrium longicauda Lindl.
- Satyrium longicolle Lindl.
- Satyrium lupulinum Lindl.
- Satyrium macrophyllum Lindl.
- Satyrium mechowii Rchb.f.
- Satyrium membranaceum Sw.
- Satyrium microcorys Schltr.
- Satyrium microrrhynchum Schltr.
- Satyrium mirum Summerh.
- Satyrium miserum Kraenzl.
- Satyrium monadenum Schltr.
- Satyrium monophyllum Kraenzl.
- Satyrium muticum Lindl.
- Satyrium neglectum Schltr.
- Satyrium neilgherrensis Fyson
- Satyrium nepalense D.Don
- Satyrium odorum Sond.
- Satyrium oliganthum Schltr.
- Satyrium orbiculare Rolfe
- Satyrium outeniquense Schltr.
- Satyrium pallens S.D.Johnson & Kurzweil
- Satyrium paludosum Rchb.f.
- Satyrium parviflorum Sw.
- Satyrium perrieri Schltr.
- Satyrium princeae Kraenzl.
- Satyrium princeps Bolus
- Satyrium pulchrum S.D.Johnson & Kurzweil
- Satyrium pumilum Thunb.
- Satyrium pygmaeum Sond.
- Satyrium retusum Lindl.
- Satyrium rhynchanthoides Schltr.
- Satyrium rhynchanthum Bolus
- Satyrium riparium Rchb.f.
- Satyrium robustum Schltr.
- Satyrium rostratum Lindl.
- Satyrium rupestre Schltr.
- Satyrium sceptrum Schltr.
- Satyrium schimperi Hochst. ex A.Rich.
- Satyrium shirense Rolfe
- Satyrium situsanguinum Niet & Liltved
- Satyrium sphaeranthum Schltr.
- Satyrium sphaerocarpum Lindl.
- Satyrium stenopetalum Lindl.
- Satyrium striatum Thunb.
- Satyrium trinerve Lindl.
- Satyrium volkensii Schltr.
- Satyrium welwitschii Rchb.f.
- Satyrium yunnanense Rolfe
