= Shirgao, Goa =

Village in Goa, India

Coordinates: 15°36′15″N 73°54′05″E

Shirgao is a village in the Bicholim sub-district (taluka) of Goa, which is popular for its annual temple festival that includes fire-walking traditions.

== Festival of the Lairai dhondachi zatra ==
The festival is known as the Lairai dhondachi zatra and usually occurs around April or May each year.

The village is estimated to have 350 houses, 70 wells, and 32 springs. However, the area faces a water shortage due to rampant mining nearby.

== Fire walking ==
On the night of the zatra, an estimated 20,000 dhonds—men and women from diverse parts of Goa and the nearby Konkan region—walk through the homkhan, over a burning charcoal bed.

Shrigao has shrines dedicated to several deities (14, according to one count) including Santer, Mahamaya, Ravalnath, Mahadev, Grampurush, Kshetrapal, Aapevans, Kulkar, Brahman, Homkhandi, Purush, Lakhamo, Aairo and Mharingan, of whom the goddess Lairai—considered to be an incarnation of goddess Parvati—is treated with particular reverence.

The official Goa Tourism site describes the festival thus:

In the early hours of the morning when the fire has died down, the raking of the coals begins. The devotees await their turn to walk on the holy path of hot coals. Around 4 a.m., the actual ritual starts, with the devotees running through the hot coals carrying their sticks and shouting the name of Devi Lairai. As the crowd watches in stunned silence, some devotees do the 'hot run' once, others do it several times. Those who have finished their run, then remove and throw their flower garlands onto a nearby banyan tree and return home. The Jatra reaches its conclusion as the sun rises in the distant hills.

GoanFestivals.in says that "One of the most looked forward event in the Hindu calendar of religious festivities is the fire walking held at Shirgao, near Assanora in the Bicholim Taluka."

== Mining ==
Shirgao is also part of the North Goa mining belt. The Vedanta-owned SRL, Goa, and its subsidiary Sesa Mining Corporation Limited extract iron ore from 11 mining leases covering 980 hectares (2,400 acres) in Goa in Bicholim and Surla, both together account for approximately 90% of SRL's total estimated iron ore reserves as of 31 March 2016. The Pale-Velguem-Bicholim-Shirgao iron ore belt is part of the Surla mine.
