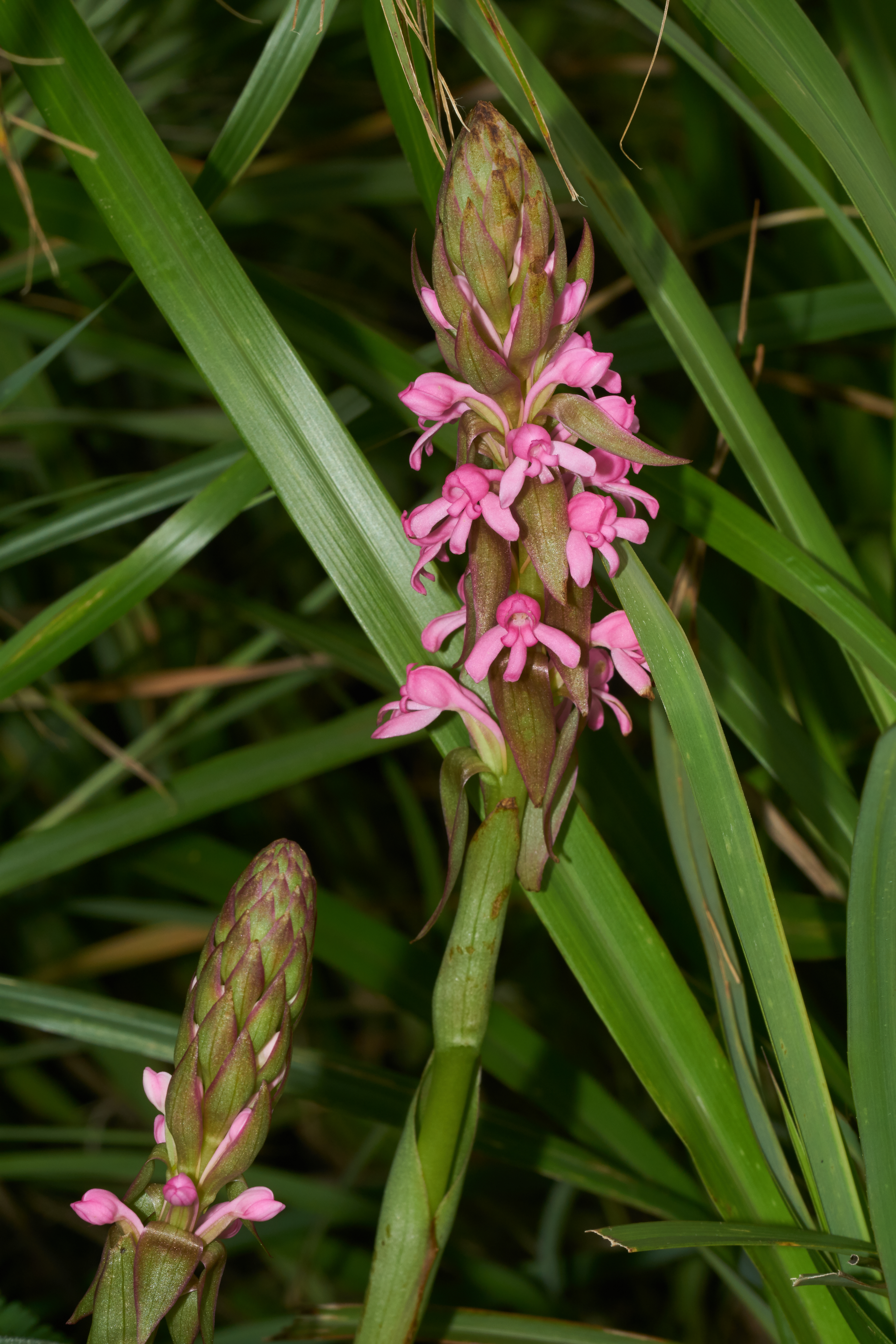
- Inflorescence

Scientific classification
- Kingdom: Plantae
- Clade: Tracheophytes
- Clade: Angiosperms
- Clade: Monocots
- Order: Asparagales
- Family: Orchidaceae
- Subfamily: Orchidoideae
- Genus: Satyrium
- Species: S. nepalense

Binomial name
- Satyrium nepalense D.Don

Synonyms
- Satyrium wightianum Lindl.; Satyrium albiflorum A.Rich.; Satyrium pallidum A.Rich.; Satyrium perrottetianum A.Rich.; Satyrium henryi Schltr.

= Satyrium nepalense =

Species of plant

Satyrium nepalense is a species of orchid occurring from the Indian subcontinent to south-central China.
