= Jatra (Maharashtra) =

Annual festival

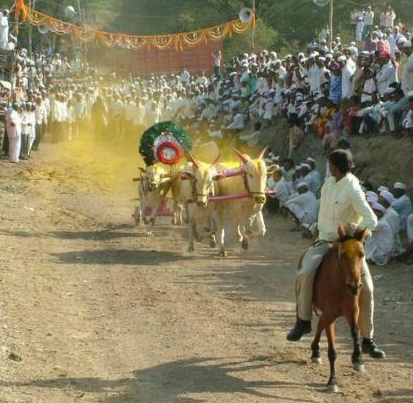
Bullock cart race at a Jatra in Manchar, Maharashtra

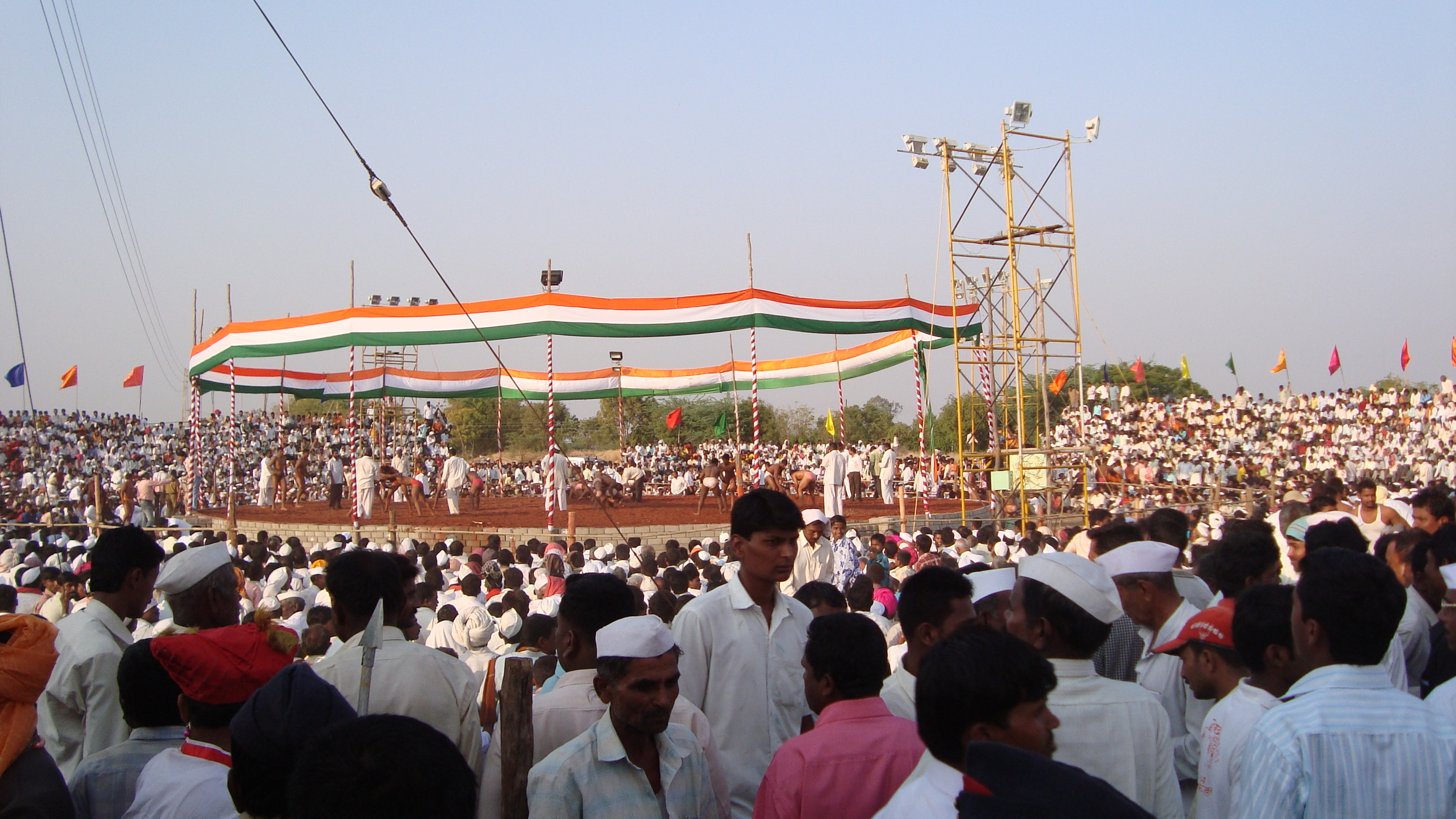
Kushti competition at Javla

Jatra or Urus are annual festivals held in a large number of villages in the Indian state of Maharashtra during the months of January to May. These may be in honour of the village Hindu deity (Gram devta) or the tomb (dargah) of a local Sufi pir. In some instances, the holy man in the tomb is revered under different names by Hindus and Muslims. Apart from religious observations, celebrations may include bullock-cart racing, kabaddi, wrestling tournaments, a fair and entertainment such as a lavani/tamasha show by travelling dance troupes. A number of families eat meat preparations only during this period. In some villages, women are given a break from cooking and other household chores by their menfolk.

== See also ==
- Zatra
