= Rughonath Vaishnavi =

Kashmiri Pandit politician

Rughonath Vaishnavi (? -22 November 1996) was a Kashmiri Pandit politician who co-founded the Jammu and Kashmir Political Conference along with Ghulam Mohiuddin Karra. A vocal advocate of Kashmir's right to self-determination, he expressed life-long solidarity with Kashmiri Muslims.

== Early life and education ==
In 1928, Vaishnavi—then, barely out of high school—had his first brush with politics as a supporter of India's movement to independence. Disillusioned with socio-religious orthodoxy, he collaborated with Kashyap Bandhu and Jiya Lal Kilam to reform regressive Hindu customs concerning dowry and widow-remarriage. In 1931, Vaishnavi embarked for Lahore and graduated with a dual degree in Psychology and Political Science. He went on to pursue his L.LB from University of Allahabad.

In late 1930s, he married Arandati and had two children.

== Politics ==
=== National Conference ===
Vaishnavi returned to Kashmir in 1938. In 1941, he joined the National Conference (NC) and got nominated to the Working Committee. As part of the committee, he framed the fourteen-point agenda which included a radical redistribution of land resources and guarantee of equal rights.

However, he seldom saw eye-to-eye with an increasingly autocratic Sheikh Abdullah, and left the National Conference in 1943. Post-1947, Vaishnavi journaled about how NC workers, emboldened in the wake of the state's controversial accession to India, targeted anybody who dared to dissent against the party line; anybody willing for Kashmir to accede to Pakistan or striving for independence was hold to be engaging in sedition. In 1952, his Urdu weekly Jamhoor (lit. Democracy) was banned by the Abdullah administration after running for about a year.

=== Political Conference ===
In 1954, Vaishnavi co-founded — alongside Ghulam Mohiuddin Karra — the Political Conference (PC): it was the only political party in Kashmir of '50s to protest against the accession and gave open calls about holding a plebiscite. (Note: Both Abdullah and Indian Intelligence operatives hold that Pakistan funded the party to destabilize Kashmir. Karra had left NC after being rebuffed for a cabinet ministry.) To Vaishnavi, the plebiscite was not a concession but a fundamental right that was pledged by India to all Kashmiris during the accession; he would later characterize India's prolonged denial of self-determination to be a "colossal failure of [humanity] and statesmanship".

In PC's first public procession on 19 June 1953, people stoned Indian Army vehicles and sloganeered for Pakistan. (Note: Shahla Hussain notes the concurrent Hindu-right led Praja Parishad agitation demanding greater integration with India to be a catalyzing factor.) The entire top rung of the party including Vaishnavi was incarcerated at Udhampur Jail; with the Fundamental Rights governing India not yet being deployed to Kashmir, it would be long before he secured release. His wife and children were allowed to meet him for the first time, months after the arrest, in December. In the next decade, Vaishnavi would be imprisoned for seven times amounting to a total of five years, and repetitively ordered to desist from all political activity — he was subject to solitary confinement in 1958 and tortured.

By the 1960s, Political Conference had lost out to All Jammu and Kashmir Plebiscite Front and disintegrated.

== Views ==
Militancy in Kashmir is a wrathful expression of frustration, breach of faith, despair caused by the jungle-rule of political goons, denial of rule of law, massive rigging at the hustings, [and] obstructing expression of the ardent wish of the Kashmiris to be freed from the strangle-hold of political subjugation.

— The first line of Kashmir Problem: How to End Militancy, R.Vaishnavi, The Radical Humanist, Volume 56, July 1992.

Vaishnavi was a prolific writer; however, much of his works remains unpublished. He had drafted multiple letters to UNO as well as Indian and Pakistani politicians urging for the restoration of independence to Kashmir; Vaishnavi felt that Kashmir was relegated to being a slave of India, after over a millennium of independence.

A pragmatic secularist, Vaishnavi viewed the Hazratbal episode as an epitome of communal harmony—"when Muslims shouted Hindu Dharam ki Jai and Kashmiri Hindus shouted Allah-u-Akbar and Islam Zindabad"—but lamented its rapid dissolution in the upcoming days and how Pandits continued to remain deaf to fellow Muslims' right to self-determination. Even months before the Pandit exodus, he had pleaded with his fellow Kashmiri Pandits to implore reason and affirm solidarity with the just struggle of Kashmiri Muslims.

== Death and legacy ==
Vaishnavi did not leave Kashmir in the 1990s unlike the majority of Kashmiri Pandits; he died on 22 November 1996 at his daughter's home in Udhampur. Many openly derided him as a Pakistani Pandit in his lifetime; even his own relatives were hesitant to pay a visit and Kilam branded him to be a "persona non grata."

The Pandit Rughonath Vaishnavi Annual Talk is organized by the Jammu Kashmir Coalition of Civil Society (JK-CCS), a human rights body. Mona Bhan—a cultural anthropologist at DePauw University—is his granddaughter and views India to be an occupational regime in Kashmir. She used to live with Vaishnavi and was a part of the Azaadi-marches in her school days during the Pandit Exodus. Bhan urges using Vaishnavi's experience to reformulate commonly held notions about Kashmiri struggle for Azaadi being an exclusively Muslim agenda, as portrayed by India under the pretext of combating Islamic radicalism.
