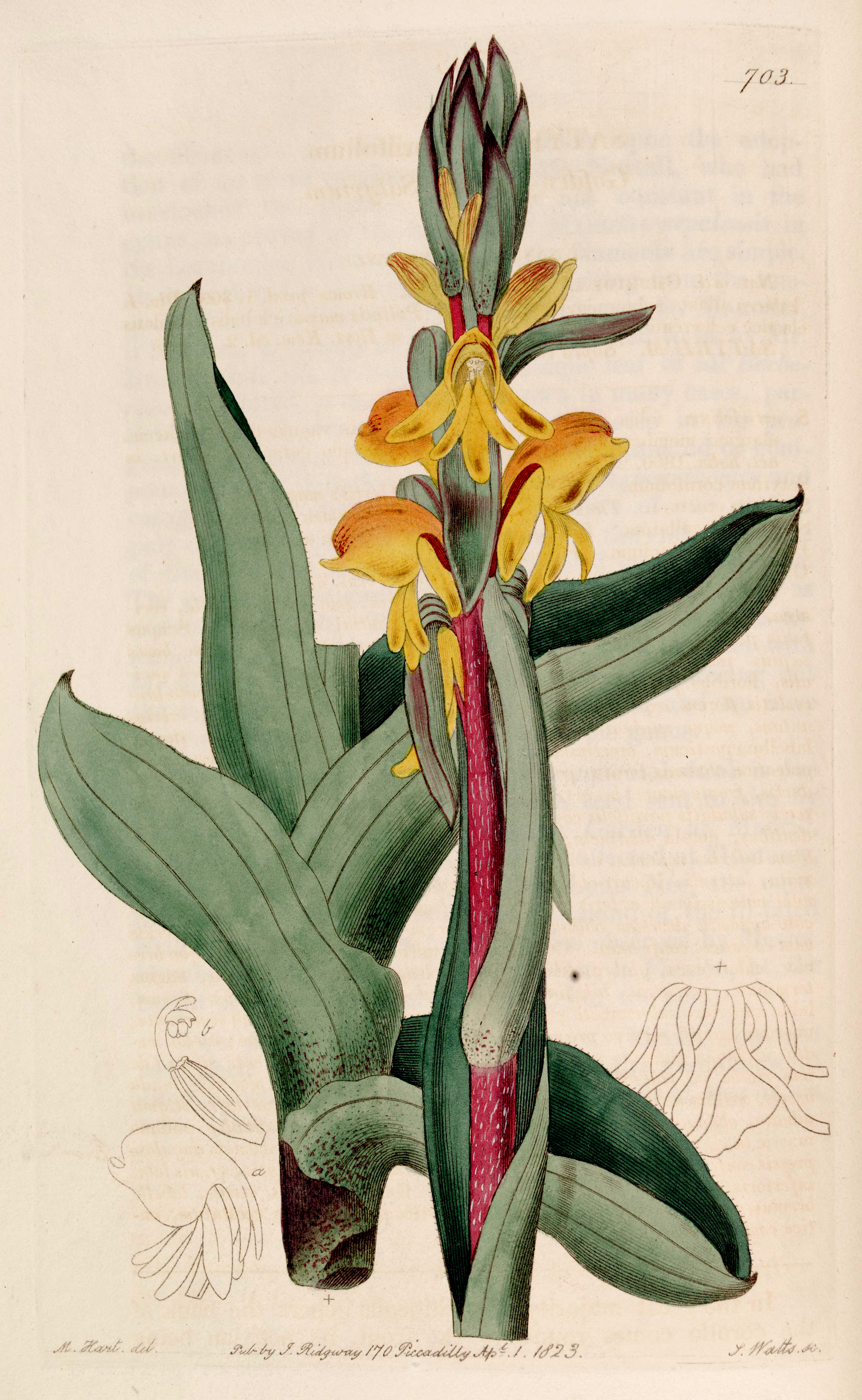
- Illustration of Satyrium coriifolium

Conservation status
- Least Concern (SANBI Red List)

Scientific classification
- Kingdom: Plantae
- Clade: Tracheophytes
- Clade: Angiosperms
- Clade: Monocots
- Order: Asparagales
- Family: Orchidaceae
- Subfamily: Orchidoideae
- Genus: Satyrium
- Species: S. coriifolium

Binomial name
- Satyrium coriifolium Sw.

Synonyms
- Orchis bicornis L.; Orchis calcarata Burm.f.; Orchis cornuta Houtt.; Diplectrum erectum Pers.; Diplectrum coriifolium (Sw.) Pers.; Satyrium cucullatum Lodd.; Satyrium chrysostachyum Herschel; Satyrium erectum (Pers.) Lindl.; Satyrium aureum Paxton

= Satyrium coriifolium =

Species of plant endemic to the Cape Provinces

Satyrium coriifolium is a species of orchid endemic to the Cape Provinces. It is commonly known as the orange satyre or Ewwa-trewwa in Afrikaans.

== Description ==
Satyrium coriifolium is brightly coloured, with yellow or orange-red flowers. It is a perennial plant. It flowers from August to November. The flowers are non-resupinate.

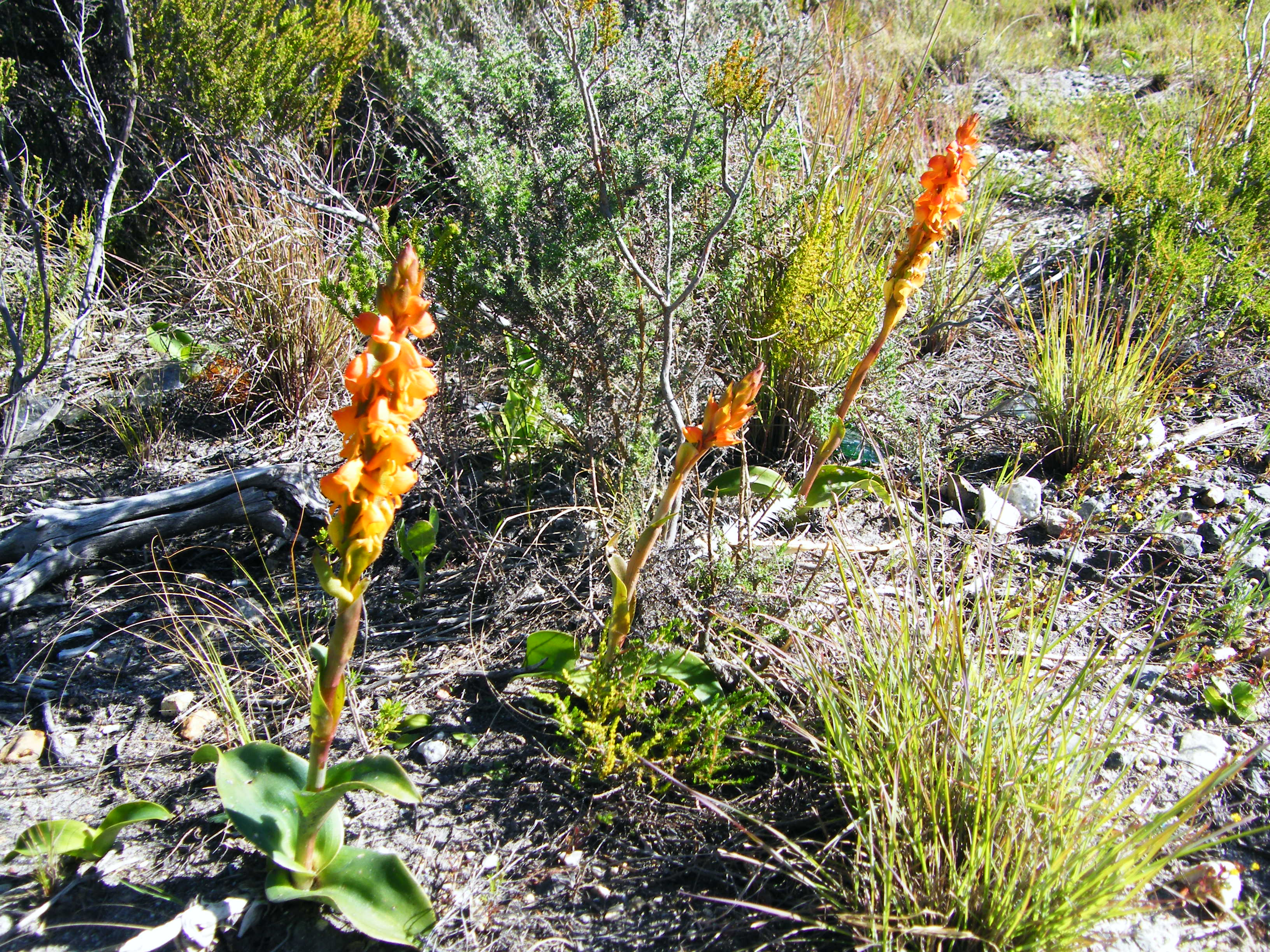
Habitat and habit

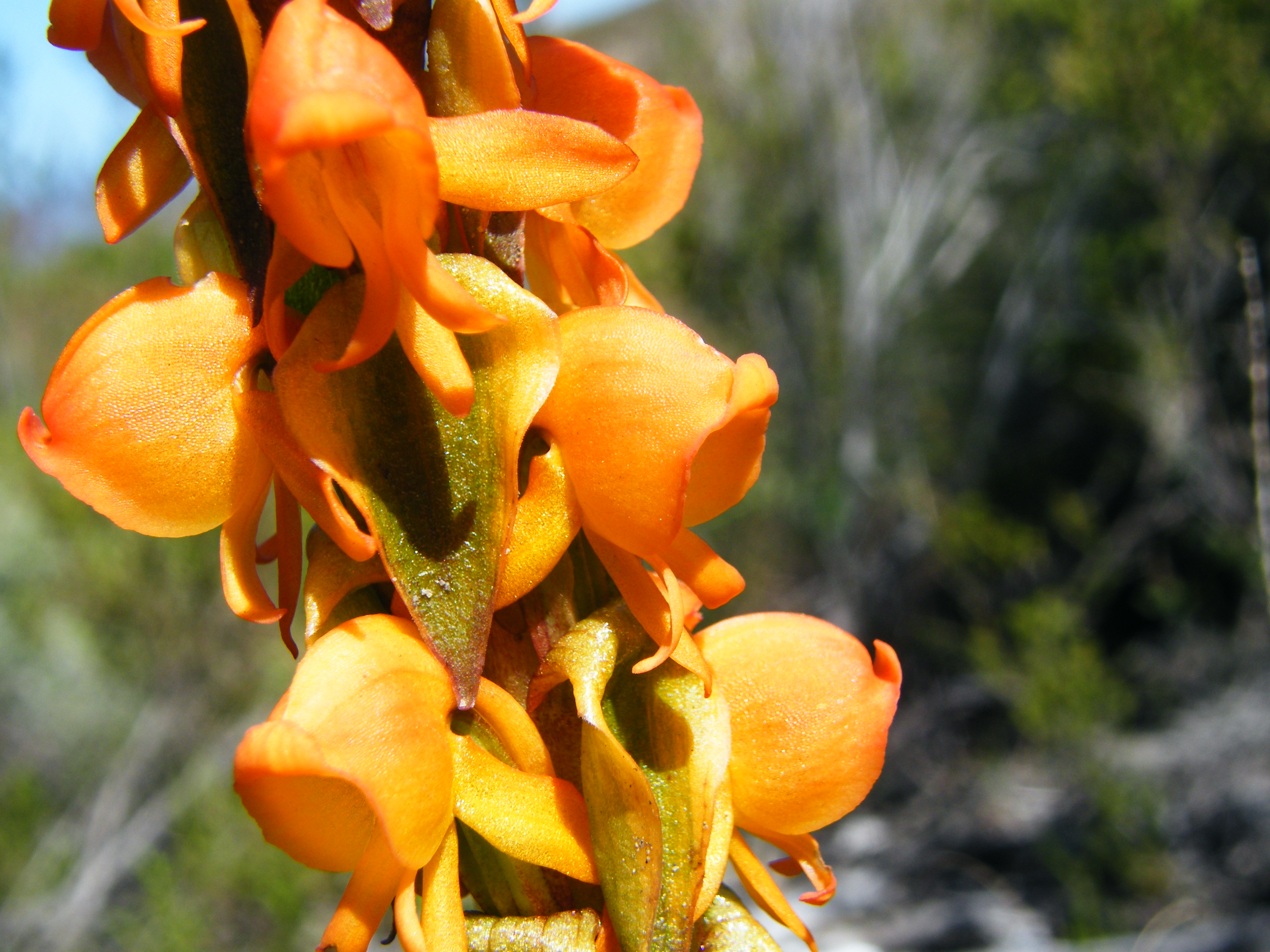
Details of inflorescence

== Distribution ==
Satyrium coriifolium is found in the Cape Floristic Region of the Western Cape and Eastern Cape.

== Ecology ==
Its bright flowers attract sunbirds, which feed on the nectar and pollinate the flowers.

== Conservation status ==
Satyrium coriifolium is classified as Least Concern.
