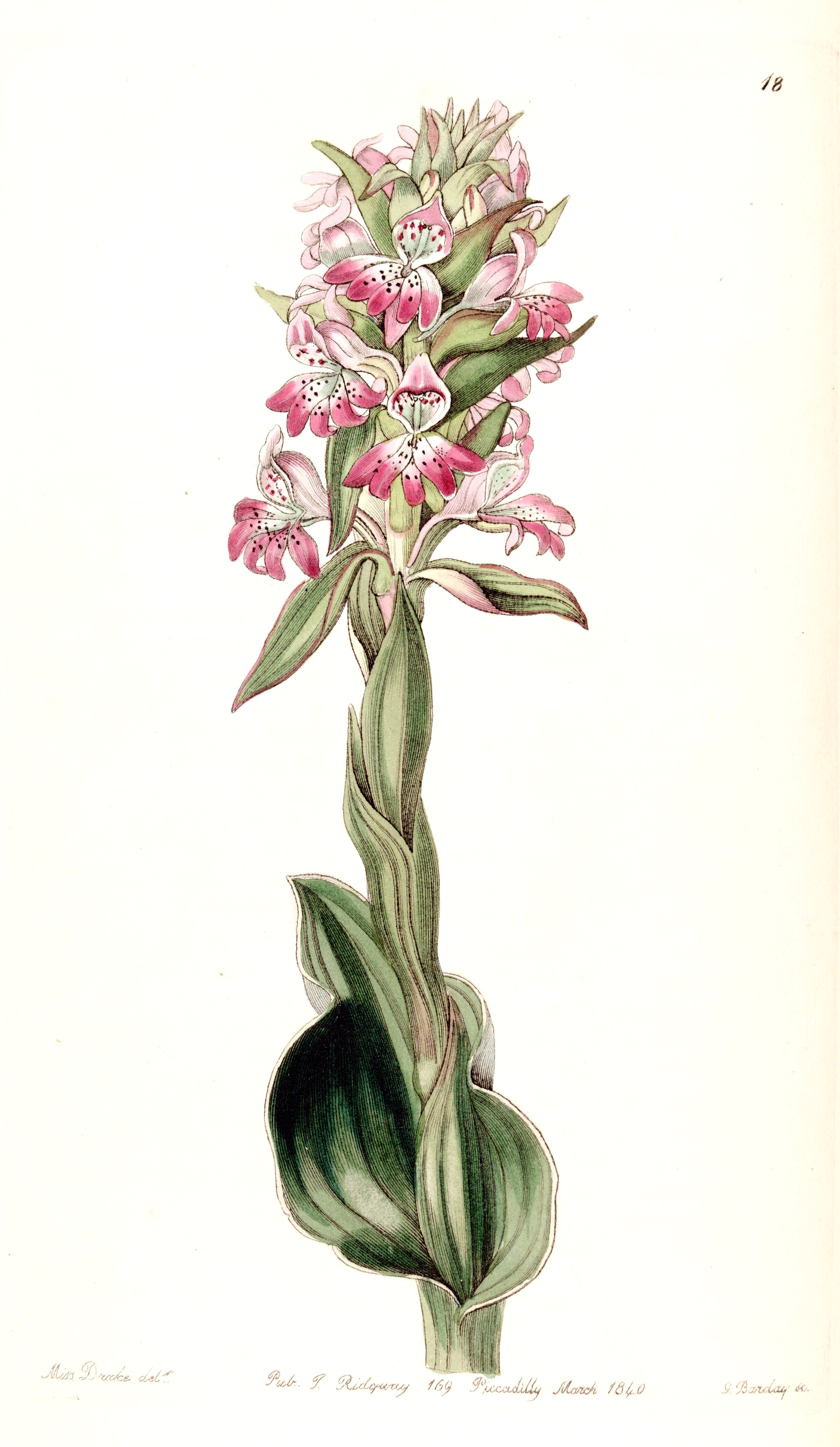
- Illustration

Scientific classification
- Kingdom: Plantae
- Clade: Tracheophytes
- Clade: Angiosperms
- Clade: Monocots
- Order: Asparagales
- Family: Orchidaceae
- Subfamily: Orchidoideae
- Genus: Satyrium
- Species: S. erectum

Binomial name
- Satyrium erectum Sw.

Synonyms
- Satyrium papillosum Lindl.; Satyrium pustulatum Lindl.

= Satyrium erectum =

Species of plant

Satyrium erectum is a species of orchid endemic to southwestern and Western Cape province.

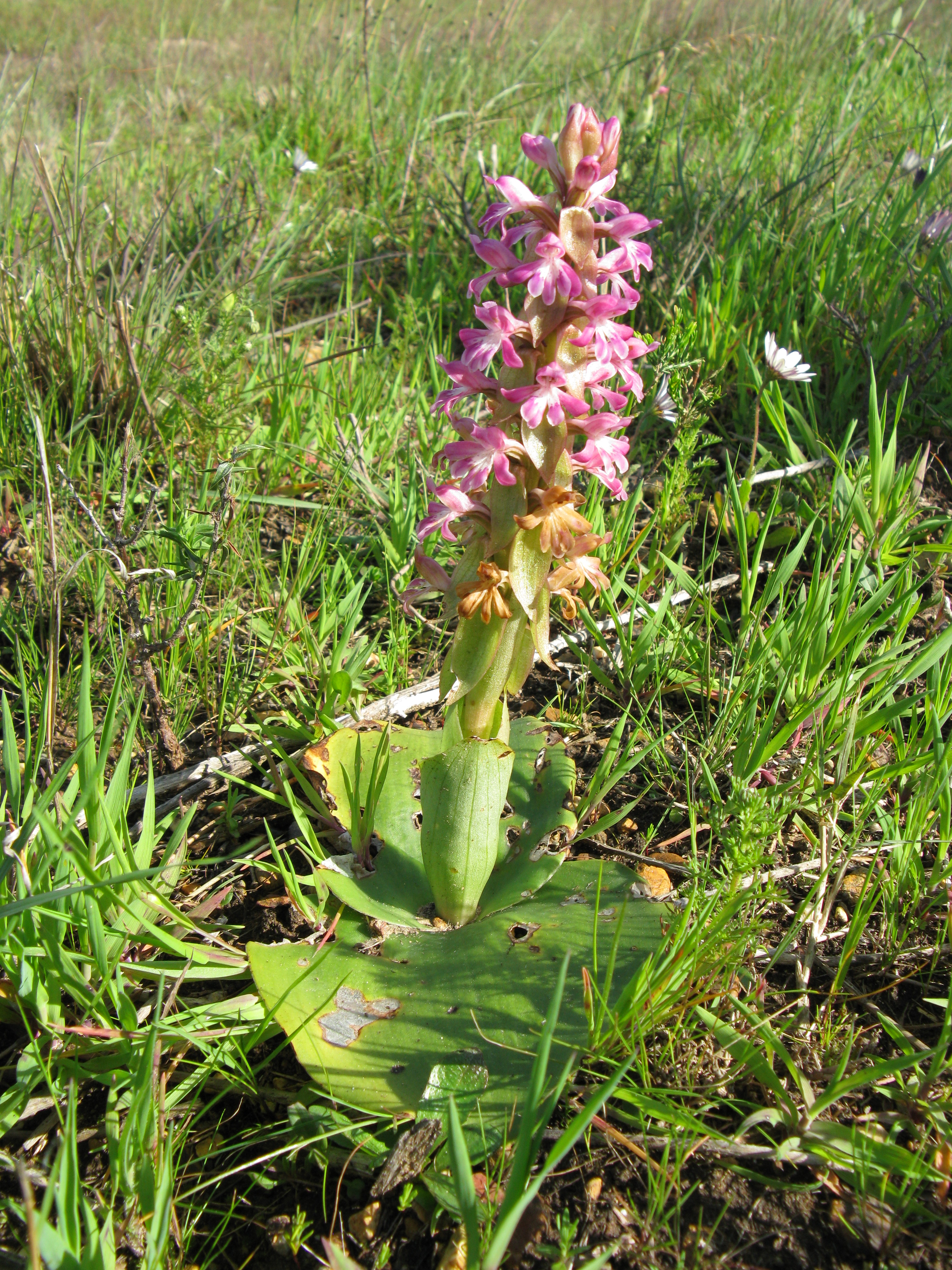
Habit and habitat; note flattened outer leaves.

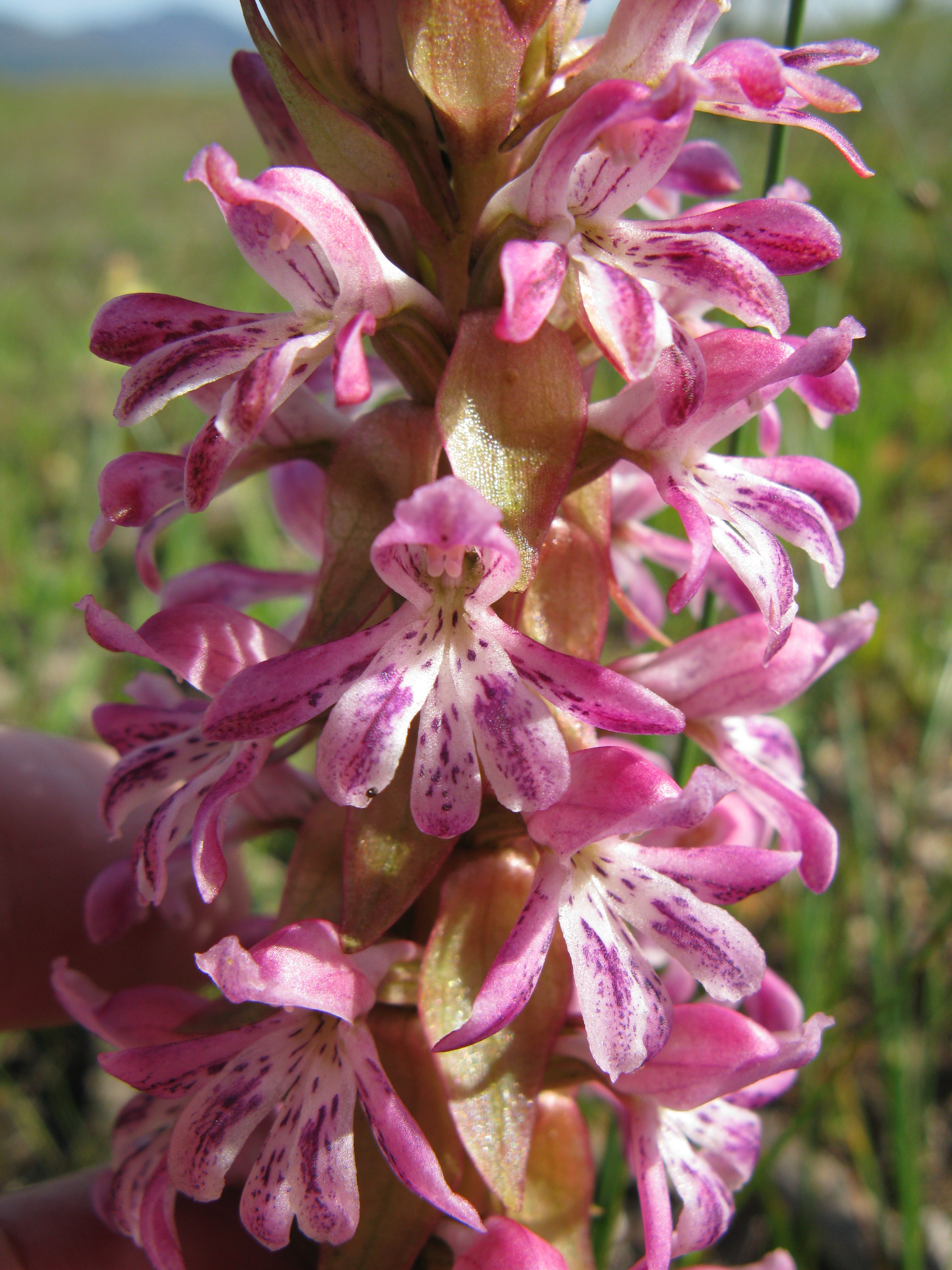
Detail of inflorescence

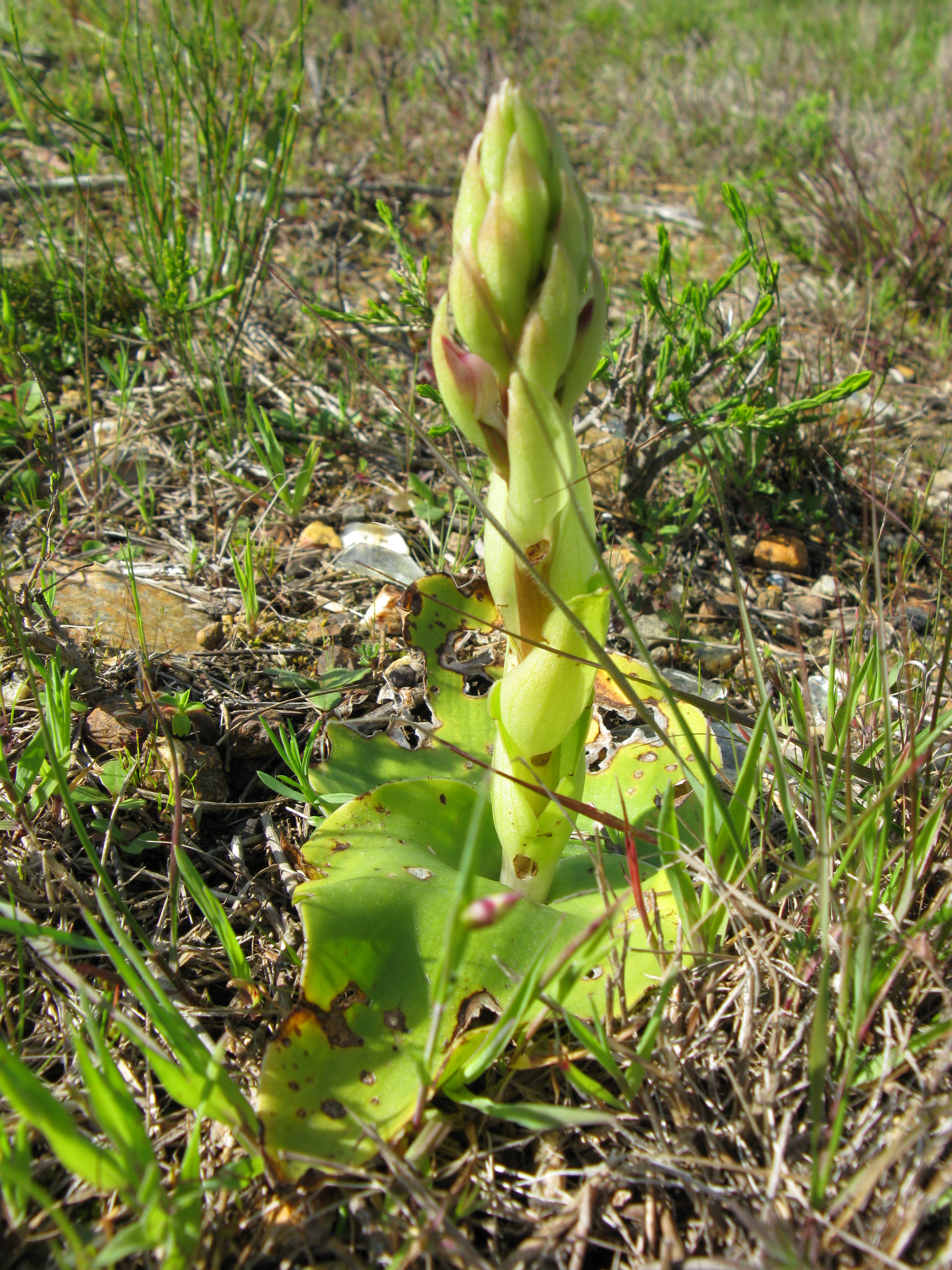
Habit in bud
