= Lairai =

Lairai is a Shakti deity worshiped in Goa, India. Her primary shrine is situated in the village of Shirgao, located at a distance of 30 km (19 mi) in Divchal (Bicholim) taluka. She is traditionally regarded as one of seven sisters.

== Iconography and religious status ==
Lairai is represented in the form of a kalasha (sacred pitcher). Her primary idol (mool murti) is in an unshaped stone (tandala) form, whereas her festival idol (utsav murti) is four-armed (chaturbhuja).

She is considered to be an incarnation of Vaishnavi Maya and is also associated with Vaishnavi, one of the Saptamatrikas. Folk verses composed about her indicate that her original place of worship may have been located on a mountain before a devotee established her shrine at the base. The site is held by devotees to be a jagrut devasthan (an active divine shrine).

== Festival ==
A major annual festival (jatra) in honor of Lairai takes place at Shirgao on Vaishakha Shuddha Panchami. The traditional event attracts participants from diverse castes and communities from across Goa as well as from outside the state.

The primary feature of the festival is a ritual fire pit known as homarvan. On the night of the festival, a large fire is lit beneath a banyan tree in the temple surroundings. Devotees of the deity, known as dhon, walk across glowing coals behind the goddess. According to local belief, pious devotees suffer no harm, whereas any fault or mistake committed by a devotee leads to their feet being burned.

Several traditional phenomena are associated with the ritual:

- The leaves of the banyan tree situated directly above the fire pit are said not to wither or dry up.
- A flower taken from the deity's kalasha and cast into the fire pit after an offering prayer (garane) is believed not to burn. If it burns, it is interpreted as a sign of the deity's anger, prompting further prayers and rituals.
