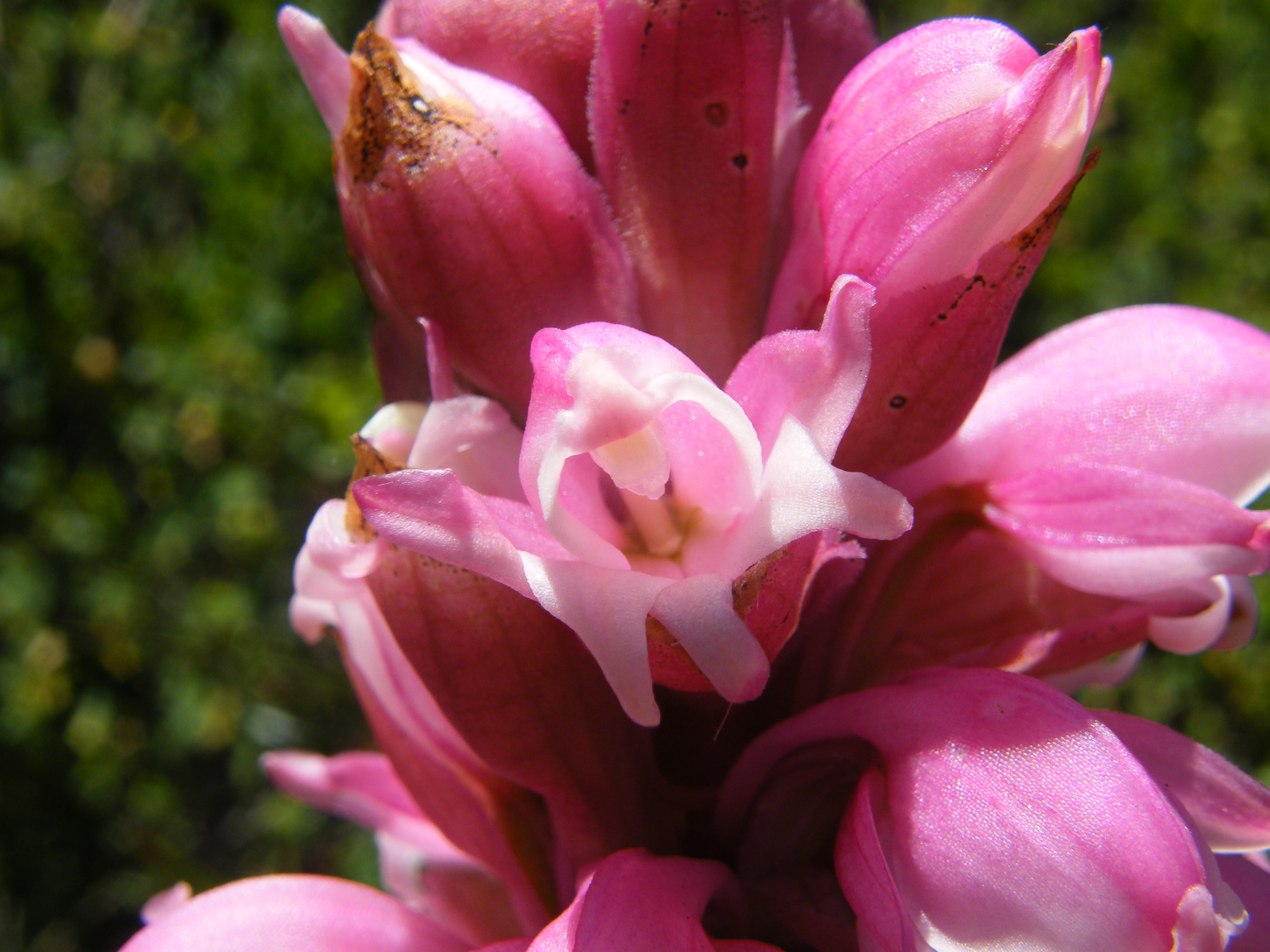
- Flower of Satyrium carneum

Conservation status
- Least Concern (SANBI Red List)

Scientific classification
- Kingdom: Plantae
- Clade: Tracheophytes
- Clade: Angiosperms
- Clade: Monocots
- Order: Asparagales
- Family: Orchidaceae
- Subfamily: Orchidoideae
- Genus: Satyrium
- Species: S. carneum

Binomial name
- Satyrium carneum (Dryand.) Sims

Synonyms
- Orchis carnea Dryand.; Orchis foliacea Burm.f.

= Satyrium carneum =

Species of plant

Satyrium carneum is a species of orchid endemic to the southwestern Western Cape. It is also known by the names pink satyr orchid, rooikappie, or rooitrewwa.

== Description ==
It is a robust terrestrial that grows from 370mm to 710mm tall. Leaves are 2 to 4, thick and fleshy; the lower 2 are partly pressed onto the ground, 70mm to 230mm long, with a gradual transition to the sheaths higher up.

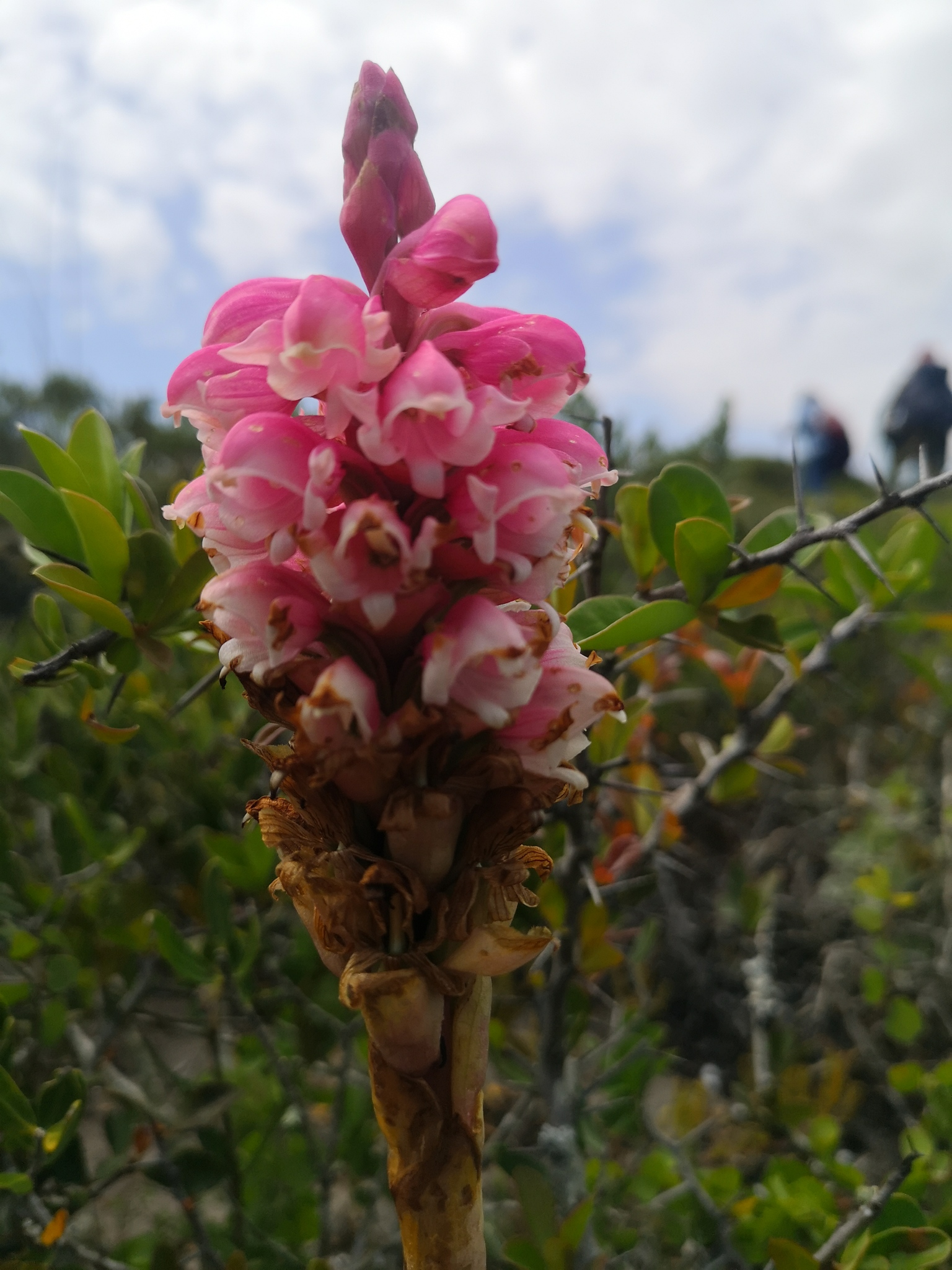

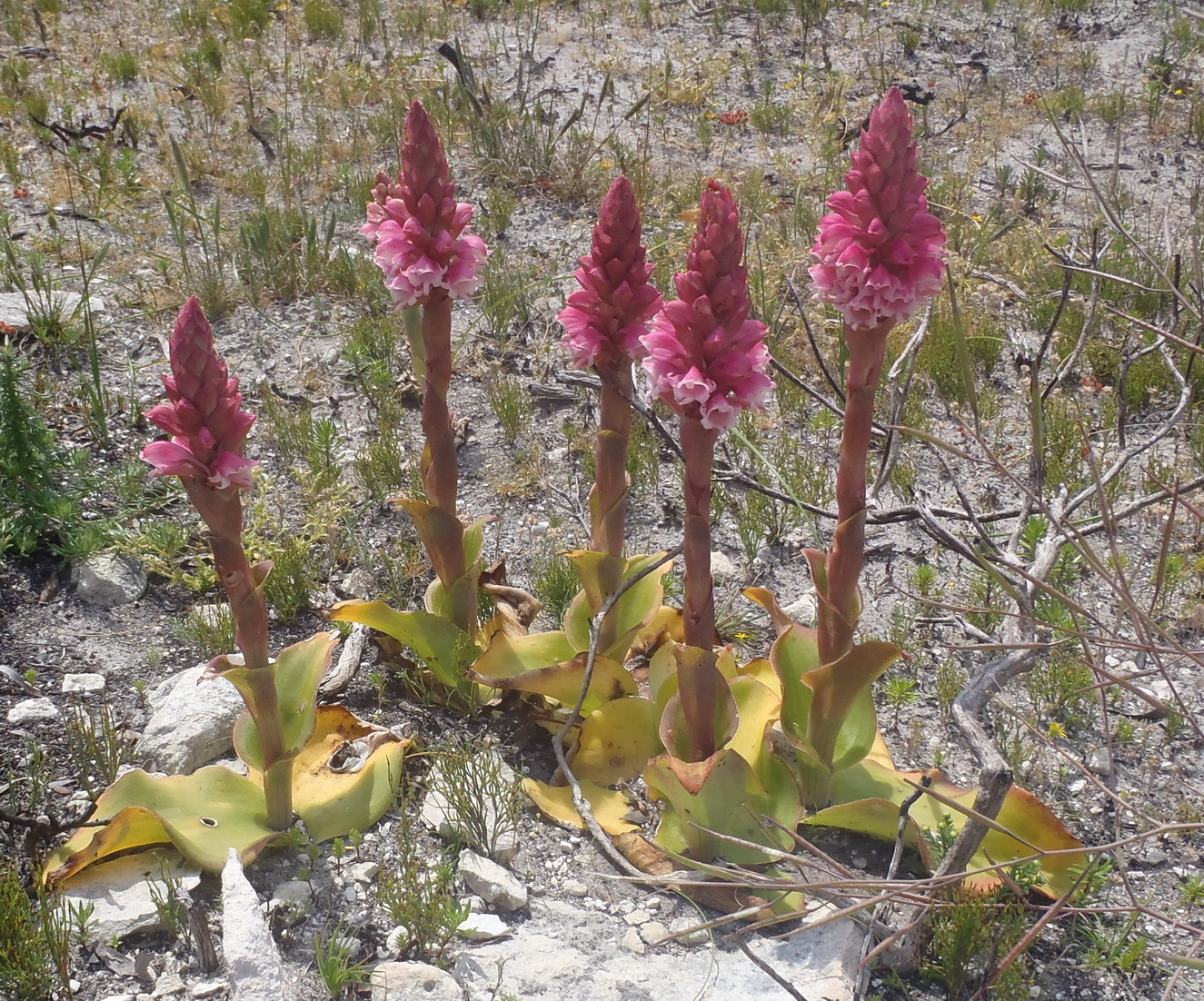

== Distribution ==
Satyrium carneum is found from the Cape Peninsula to Riversdale and Sedgefield. It is becoming increasingly local and rare.

== Habitat ==
Satyrium carneum is found in dune bush vegetation, in fynbos on coastal hills and on ridges, on moist to dry sands and limestone, at altitudes of 10–300 m.

== Conservation status ==
Satyrium carneum is classified as Least Concern, as it is a common species that is declining across its range, but not yet in danger of extinction. Recent observations indicate that it still persists in at least 25 locations. It faces threats of habitat loss; it has lost 22% of its habitat to urban expansion on the Cape Peninsula and Cape Flats, and coastal development between Betty's Bay and Gansbaai. It is also threatened by competition from dense infestations of alien invasive plants across its range.
