= Interspecies communication =

Communication between different species

Interspecies communication, interspecific communication, or heterospecific communication refers to communication among animals, plants, microorganisms, or other organisms of different species. Although researchers have explored the topic for many years, only recently has interspecies communication been recognized as an established field of inquiry.

== Eavesdropping ==
Heterospecific eavesdropping occurs when an organism of one species gleans information from a signal emitted by an organism of another species for the purpose of conveying information to conspecifics. In some cases, two species may exhibit bidirectional eavesdropping, in which organisms of both species acquire information from signals originating from organisms of the other. Eavesdropping is sometimes not considered a form of communication, but other models include it.

Heterospecific eavesdropping allows organisms to obtain and benefit from information they might not otherwise be able to access as quickly, and may occur as part of mutualistic, commensal, competitive, parasitic, or predator-prey interactions.

=== Alarm signals ===
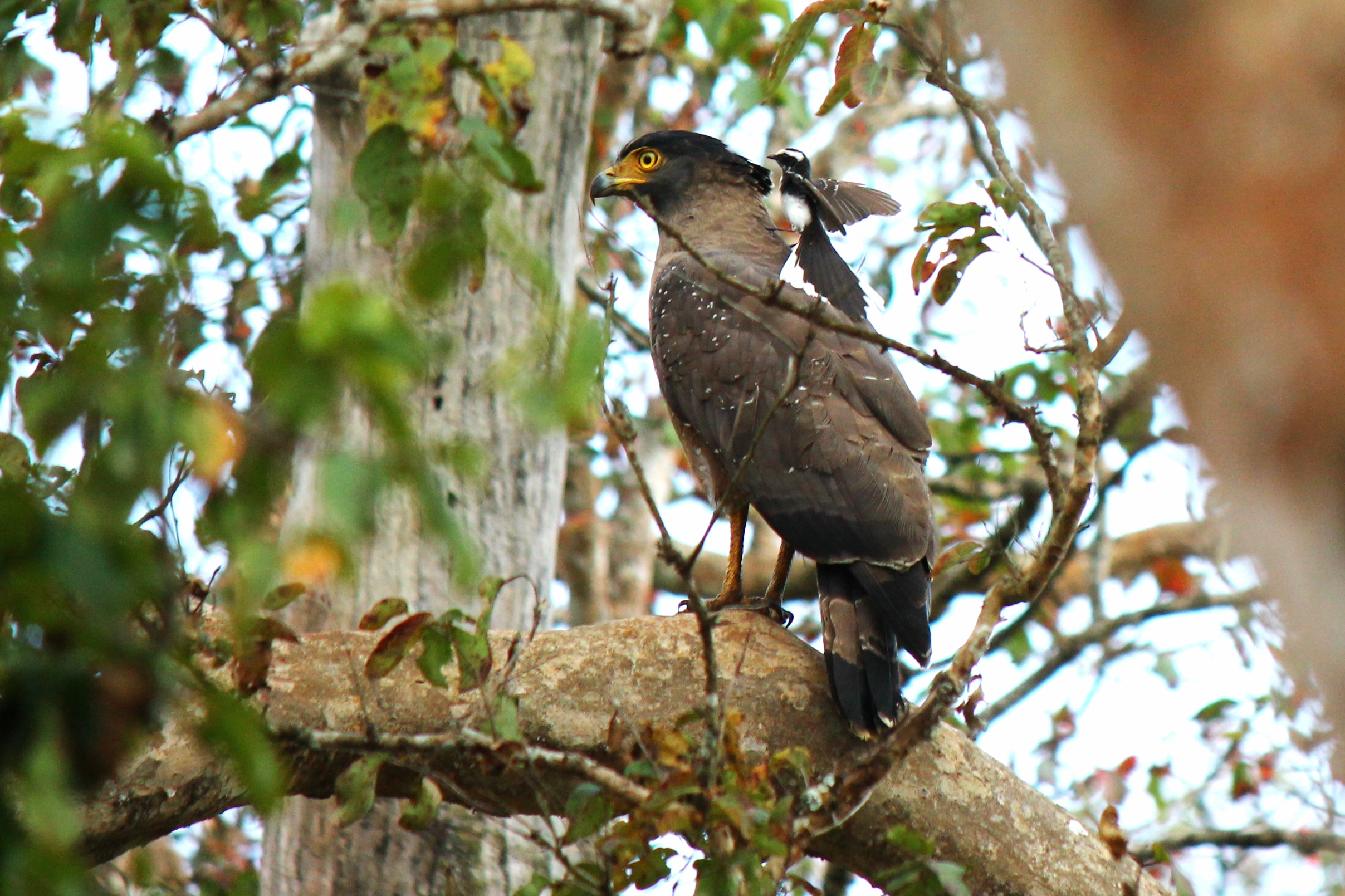
Eagle being mobbed by a fantail

Responses to heterospecific alarm calls have been documented in over 70 mammalian, avian, and even reptilian species, some of which produce no alarm calls themselves. When alarm calls contain more detailed information, their comprehension by heterospecifics varies, with some eavesdroppers extracting information on predator type or degree of danger. For instance, Diana monkeys appear to distinguish between Campbell's monkey alarm calls indicating leopards and those indicating eagles. Furthermore, when one species elicits an alarm signal specific to a certain predator, the other species react in the same pattern as the species that called. For example, leopards hunt both species by capitalizing the elements of stealth and surprise. If the monkeys detect the leopard before it attacks (usually resulting in mobbing), the leopard will typically not attack. Therefore, when a leopard alarm call is given, both species respond by positioning near the leopard signaling that it has been found out. Eavesdropping on alarm calls can occur bidirectionally, as with redfronted lemurs and Verreaux's sificas, which both exhibit mixed alarm call systems and respond differently to distinct alarm calls of the other species. Beyond distinguishing among distinct alarm calls, superb fairy-wrens and white-browed scrubwrens mutually understand variations in single calls as establishing degrees of danger.

Responses to heterospecific alarm calls have been identified in species that do not otherwise interact with one another, such as between the yellow-bellied marmot and golden-mantled ground squirrel. Animals also engage in alarm signal eavesdropping across classes, with mammals and the Galapagos marine iguana documented eavesdropping on the alarm calls of birds and bird species found to eavesdrop on the alarm calls of mammals. Red squirrels' acoustic response to raptors is near-identical to that of birds, making the latter also aware to a potential predatory threat, while eastern chipmunks are keen to mobbing calls by eastern tufted titmice. Whether heterospecific understanding is a learned behavior or not is unclear.

Alarm signal eavesdropping may benefit the signaling species as well as the eavesdropper, either by depriving a shared predator of prey and causing it to leave an area, or by leading eavesdroppers to participate in mobbing. For instance, black-capped chickadees produce mobbing calls that detail size and location information on predators, to which 24-50 different species are known to respond by participating in the mobbing. One of these species, the red-breasted nuthatch, has been shown to selectively respond only to chickadee mobbing calls indicating more dangerous predators in order to save energy, demonstrating comprehension of complex heterospecific signals.

Song of a Great Tit.

Eavesdropping has been found in túngara frogs and their sympatric heterospecifics. The scientists posit that mixed-species choruses may reduce their risk of predation without increasing mate competition.

=== In predation ===
Heterospecifics may benefit from information obtained from eavesdropping differently from the intended conspecific receivers, and signalers may modify their behavior to combat effective eavesdropping. Fringe-lipped bats hunt by eavesdropping on frog mating calls, using these acoustic signals both to identify suitable prey species such as túngara frogs and to locate individuals. Because of this, male túngara frogs are known to produce less effective mating calls which are not preferred by fringe-lipped bats, but which are also not preferred by female túngara frogs.

=== Development of interspecific eavesdropping ===
In 2000 it was found that age and interspecies experience were important factors in the ability for bonnet macaques to recognize heterospecific calls. Macaques who were exposed longer to other species' alarm calls were more likely to correctly respond to heterospecific alarm calls. Key to this early learning was the reinforcement of a predatory threat, when an alarm call was given a corresponding threat had to be presented in order to make the association. Interspecies communication may not be an innate ability but rather a sort of imprinting coupled with an intense emotion (fear) early in life. Other species, such as the fringe-lipped bat, display social learning of new signals associated with prey in maturity.

Interspecies communication between an older caretaker animal and a younger animal is observed in the animal world only rarely. In the case of Owen and Mzee, a orphaned baby hippopotamus bonded with a 130-year-old Aldabran tortoise named Mzee (Swahili for a wise old man). According to staff at their animal sanctuary, they vocalized to each other in neither a stereotypical tortoise nor a hippopotamus fashion. Owen does not respond to hippopotamus calls. It is likely that when Owen was first introduced to Mzee he was still young enough to be imprinted.

== Intentional signaling ==
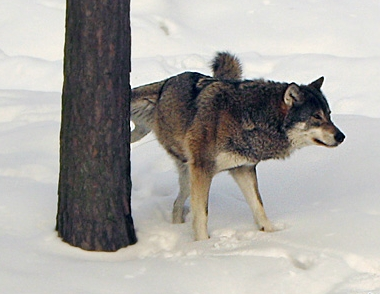
Chemical signals in wolf urine are avoided by their prey

Intentional signaling occurs when an organism of one species produces a signal whose intended recipient or recipients belong to another species. This includes flowering plants’ uses of colors and scents to signal to pollinators that they contain nectar. As with flowering plants and pollinators, signalling may be deceptive: some flowering plants such as slipper orchids signal that they contain nectar through color and scent, but provide no benefit to pollinators.

Work by Gorissen, Gorissen, and Eens (2006) on song matching (or "song imitation") found that while great tits imitate the vocalizations of blue tits, other great tits do not respond to these imitations, suggesting they may use these imitations to signal to blue tits, rather than other great tits.

Much of the communication between predators and prey can be defined as signaling. In some animals, the best way to avoid being preyed upon is an advertisement of danger or unpalatability, or aposematism. Given the effectiveness of this, it is no surprise that many animals employ styles of mimicry to ward off predators. Some predators also use aggressive mimicry as a hunting technique. For example, Photuris fireflies mimic female Photinus fireflies by scent and glow patterns in order to lure interested male Photinus fireflies, which they then kill and eat. Lophiiformes, or anglerfish, are also famous for their use of escas as bait for small unsuspecting fish.

Two examples of predator–prey signaling were found in caterpillars and ground squirrels. When physically disturbed, Lepidoptera larvae produce a clicking noise with their mandibles followed by an unpalatable oral secretion. Scientists believe this to be "acoustic aposematism" which has only been previously found in a controlled study with bats and tiger moths. While the defense mechanisms of ground squirrels to predatory rattlesnakes have been well studied (i.e. tail flagging), only recently have scientists discovered that these squirrels also employ a type of infrared heat signaling. By using robotic models of squirrels, the researchers found that when infrared radiation was added to tail flagging, rattlesnakes shifted from predatory to defensive behavior and were less likely to attack than when no radiation component was added.

== Allomones ==
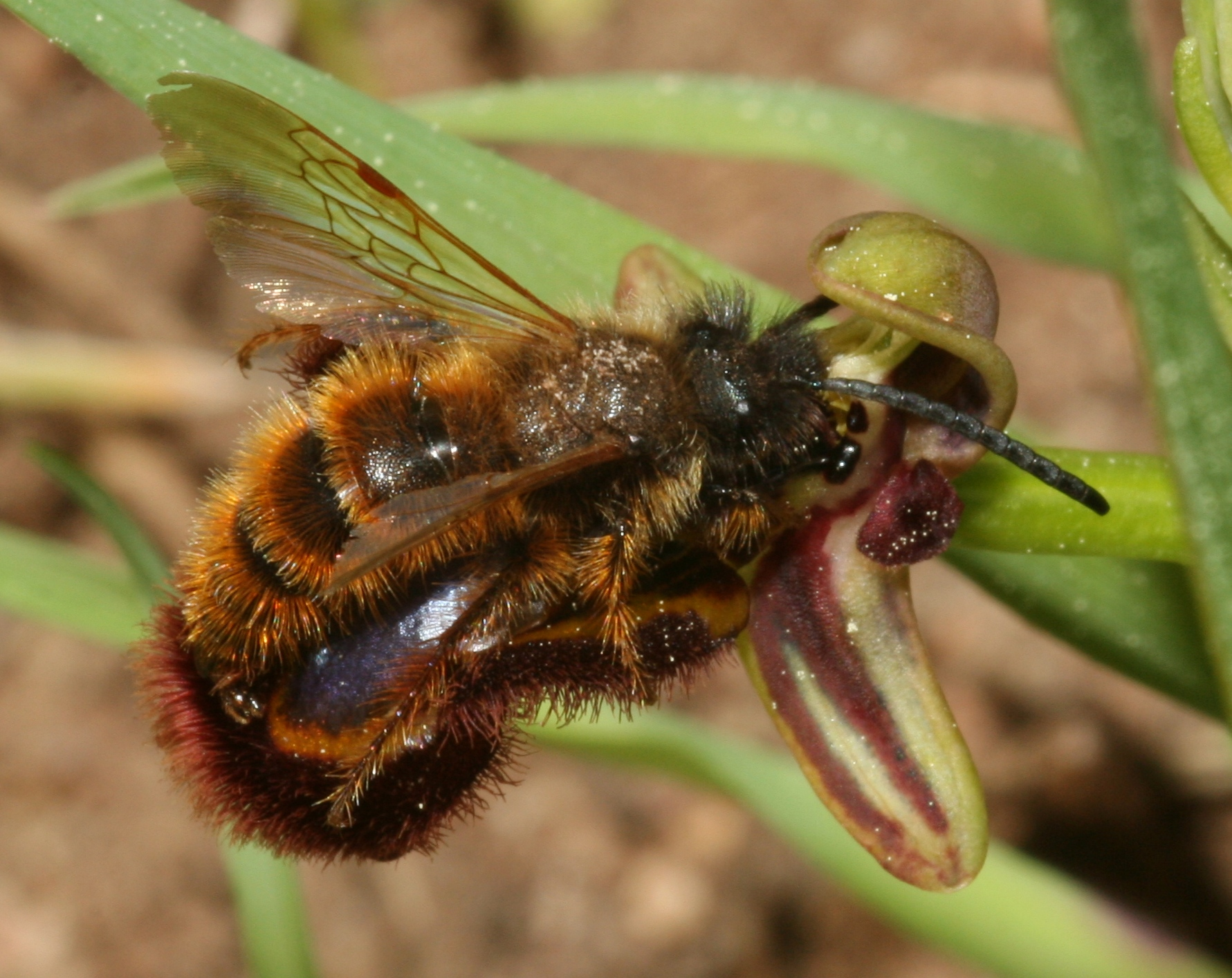
Dasyscolia ciliata on the flowers of Ophrys speculum

An allomone (from Ancient Greek ἄλλος allos "other" and pheromone) is a type of semiochemical produced and released by an individual of one species that affects the behaviour of a member of another species to the benefit of the originator but not the receiver. Production of allomones is a common form of defense against predators, particularly by plant species against insect herbivores. In addition to defense, allomones are also used by organisms to obtain their prey or to hinder any surrounding competitors.

Many insects have developed ways to defend against these plant defenses (in an evolutionary arms race). One method of adapting to allomones is to develop a positive reaction to them; the allomone then becomes a kairomone. Others alter the allomones to form pheromones or other hormones, and yet others adopt them into their own defensive strategies, for example by regurgitating them when attacked by an insectivorous insect.

A third class of allelochemical (chemical used in interspecific communication), synomones, benefit both the sender and receiver.

"Allomone was proposed by Brown and Eisner (Brown, 1968) to denote those substances which convey an advantage upon the emitter. Because Brown and Eisner did not specify whether or not the receiver would benefit, the original definition of allomone includes both substances that benefit the receiver and the emitter, and substances that only benefit the emitter. An example of the first relationship would be a mutualistic relationship, and the latter would be a repellent secretion."

== Kairomones ==
A kairomone is a semiochemical released by an organism that mediates interspecific interactions in a way that benefits a different species at the expense of the emitter. Derived from the Greek καιρός, meaning "opportune moment", it serves as a form of "eavesdropping", enabling the receiver to gain an advantage, such as locating food or evading predators, even if it poses a risk to the emitter. Unlike allomones, which benefit the producer at the receiver's cost, or synomones, which are mutually beneficial, kairomones favor only the recipient. Primarily studied in entomology, kairomones can play key roles in predator-prey dynamics, mate attraction, and even applications in pest control.

== Synomones ==
A synomone is an interspecific semiochemical that is beneficial to both interacting organisms, the emitter and receiver, e.g. floral synomone of certain Bulbophyllum species (Orchidaceae) attracts fruit fly males (Tephritidae: Diptera) as pollinators, so can be classed as an attractant. In this true mutualistic inter-relationship, both organisms gain benefits in their respective sexual reproductive systems – i.e. orchid flowers are pollinated and the Dacini fruit fly males are rewarded with a sex pheromone precursor or booster. The floral synomone, also acts as a reward to pollinators, is either in the form of a phenylpropanoid (e.g. methyl eugenol) or a phenylbutanoid (e.g. raspberry ketone and zingerone).

Another example of a synomone is trans-2-hexenal, emitted by trees in the Mimosa / Acacia clade of the Fabaceae. These trees form distinctive hollow structures in which ants nest. When a leaf is disrupted by an herbivore, the damaged cells emit trans-2-hexenal (among other volatiles), which is detected by the ants. The ants swarm to the herbivore, biting and stinging to defend their host plant. The tree repays them in turn by providing sugary nectar and fat- and protein-rich Beltian bodies to feed the ant colony.

== Human-animal communication ==
Since the 1970s, primatologist Sue Savage-Rumbaugh has been working with primates at Georgia State University's Language Research Center (LRC), and more recently, the Iowa Primate Learning Sanctuary. In 1985, using lexigram symbols, a keyboard and monitor, and other computer technology, Savage-Rumbaugh began her groundbreaking work with Kanzi, a male bonobo (P. paniscus). Her research has made significant contributions to a growing body of work in sociobiology studying language learning in non-human primates and exploring the role of language and communication as an evolutionary mechanism.

Koko, a lowland gorilla, began learning a modified American Sign Language as an infant, when Francine "Penny" Patterson, PhD, started working with her in 1975. Penny and Koko worked together at the Gorilla Foundation in one of the longest interspecies communication studies ever conducted until Koko's death in 2018. It was claimed that Koko had a vocabulary of over 1000 signs, and understood a greater amount of spoken English. However, scientific consensus is that Koko did not demonstrate a true understanding of language, due to a lack of regard for syntax or grammar.

In April 1998, Koko gave an AOL live chat. Sign language was used to relay to Koko questions from the online audience of 7,811 AOL members. The following is an excerpt from the live chat.

AOL: MInyKitty asks Koko are you going to have a baby in the future?
PENNY: OK, is that for Koko? Koko are you going to have a baby in the future?
KOKO: Koko-love eat ... sip.
AOL: Me too!
PENNY: What about a baby? You going to have baby? She's just thinking...her hands are together...
KOKO: Unattention.
PENNY: Oh poor sweetheart. She said 'unattention.' She covered her face with her hands..which means it's not happening, basically, or it hasn't happened yet. . . I don't see it.
AOL: That's sad!
PENNY: It is responding to the question. In other words, she hasn't had one yet, and she doesn't see a future here. The way the situation is actually with Koko & Ndume, she has 2 males to 1 female which is the reverse of what she needs. I think that is why she said that, because in our current situation, it isn't possible for her to have a baby. She needs several females and one male to have a family.

== Criticism ==
Social scientists and others have historically criticized research in interspecies communication, characterizing it as anthropomorphizing. This perspective has become less common in recent years. A 2013 TED Talk featured a proposal to construct an Interspecies Internet by presenters musician Peter Gabriel, Internet protocol co-inventor Vint Cerf, cognitive psychologist Diana Reiss, and director of MIT's Center for Bits and Atoms Neil Gershenfeld. A follow-up workshop to review progress and plan future activities occurred in 2019 and was co-hosted by MIT's Center for Bits and Atoms, Google, and the Jeremy Coller Foundation. The ongoing efforts coalesced into a think-tank to accelerate understanding of interspecies communication. Workshops and public conferences were held in 2020 and 2021.

== See also ==
- Alien language – Hypothetical language of extraterrestrial beings
- Animal communication – Transfer of information from animal to animal
- Clever Hans – Horse who performed math tricks (1890s–1910s)
- Great ape language – Efforts to teach other apes human communication
- Human–animal communication – Verbal and non-verbal interspecies communication
- Jim Nollman – American composer (born 1947)
- John C. Lilly – American physician, scientist, psychonaut, and philosopher
- Pet psychic – Psudoscientific claims of animal communication
- Quorum-sensing – Biological ability to detect and respond to cell population density
- Symbiosis – Ecological interaction between taxa
