= Aroma of wine =

Olfactory sensation of wine

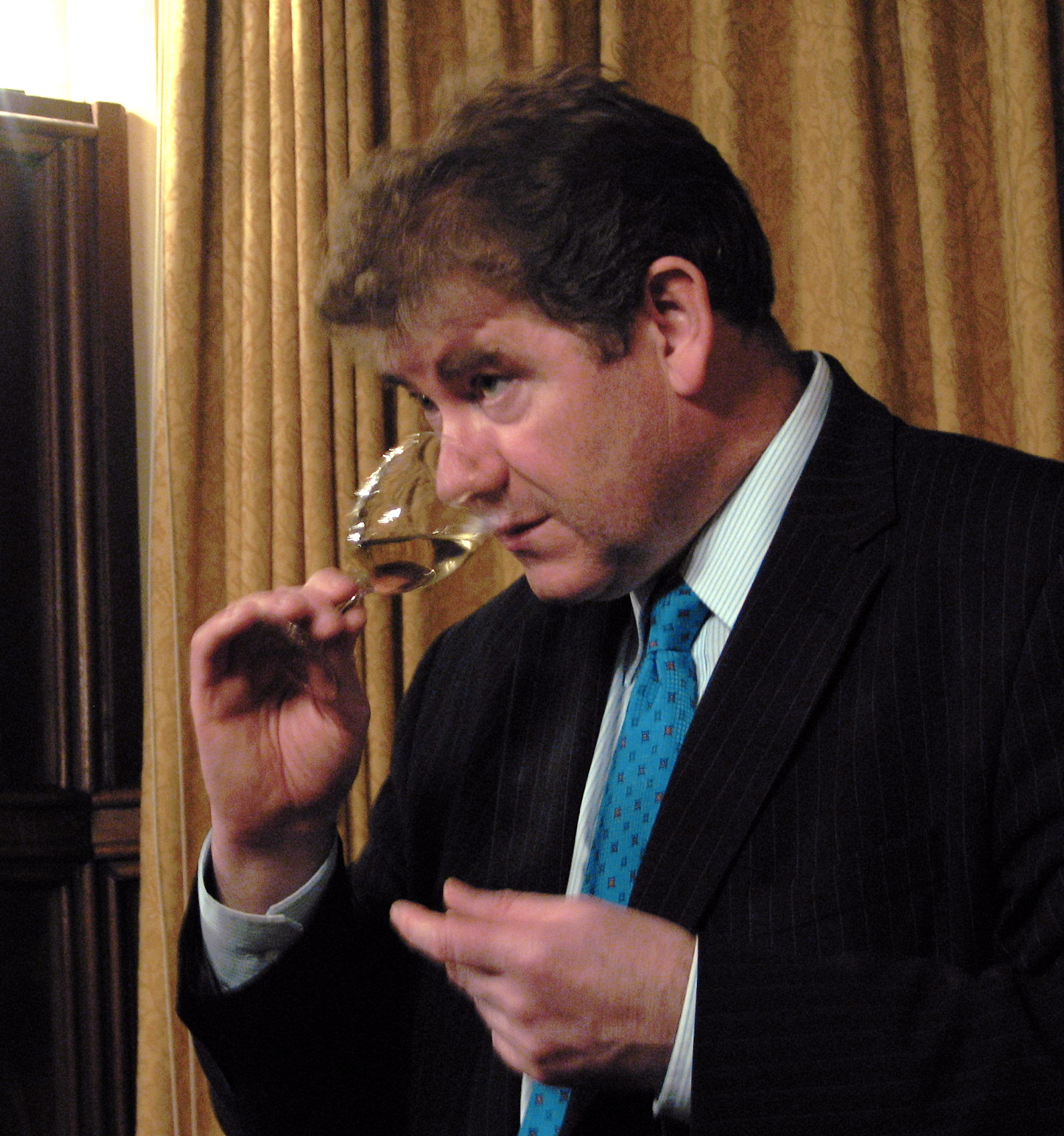
Smelling is an important part of wine tasting; it is thought that much of perceived taste is due to olfactory receptors at the back of the nasal cavity.

The aromas of wine are more diverse than its flavours. The human tongue is limited to the primary tastes perceived by taste receptors on the tongue – sourness, bitterness, saltiness, sweetness and savouriness. The wide array of fruit, earthy, leathery, floral, herbal, mineral, and woodsy flavour present in wine are derived from aroma notes sensed by the olfactory bulb. In wine tasting, wine is sometimes smelled before taking a sip in order to identify some components of the wine that may be present. Different terms are used to describe what is being smelled. The most basic term is aroma which generally refers to a "pleasant" smell as opposed to odour which refers to an unpleasant smell or possible wine fault. The term aroma may be further distinguished from bouquet which generally refers to the smells that arise from the chemical reactions of fermentation and aging of the wine.

== Aroma vs. bouquet ==
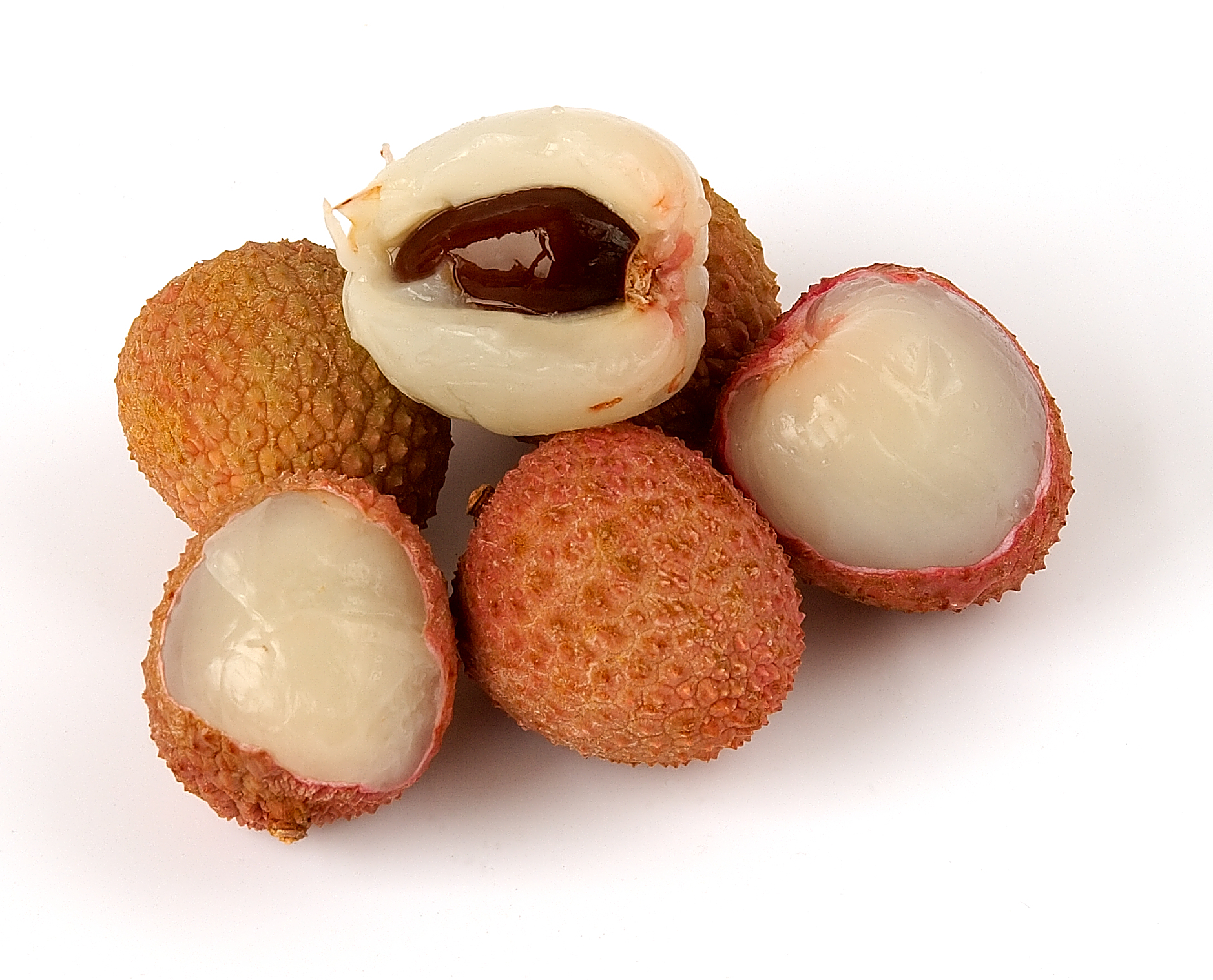
A common aroma associated with the grape variety Gewürztraminer is that of lychee fruit.

In professional wine tasting, there is generally a distinction made between "aromas" and a wine's "bouquet" while in casual wine tasting these two terms are used interchangeably. An aroma refers to the smells unique to the grape variety and are most readily demonstrated in a varietal wine – such as lychees with Gewürztraminer or black currant with Cabernet Sauvignon. These are smells that are commonly associated with a young wine. As a wine ages, chemical reactions among acids, sugars, alcohols and phenolic compounds create new smells that are known as a wine's bouquet. These can include honey in an aged Sauternes or truffles in a Pinot noir. The term bouquet can also be expanded to include the smells derived from fermentation and exposure to oak. In Burgundy, the aromas of wines are sub-divided into three categories – primary, secondary and tertiary aromas. Primary aromas are those specific to the grape variety itself. Secondary aromas are those derived from fermentation. Tertiary aromas are those that develop through either bottle or oak aging.

The technique of microoxygenation affects the aromatic bouquet.

== Components of a wine's aroma ==
Within wine there are volatile and non-volatile compounds that contribute to the make up of a wine's aroma. During the fermentation and for the first few months of a wine's existence, chemical reactions among these compounds occur frequently and a wine's aroma will change more rapidly during this period than at any other point. As a wine ages and matures, changes and developments in aroma will continue to take place but at a slower and more gradual pace. Volatile aroma compounds are present in the skin and juice of a grape berry and will vary in composition according to the individual grape variety. It is theorized that the Vitis vine developed these compounds as an evolutionary tool to aid in procreation by attracting insects to assist with pollination and birds and other animals to eat the berries and disperse the seeds. The diverse spectrum of aromas associated with individual grape varieties is a reflection of the vine's adaptation to ecological conditions and competition among other plants.

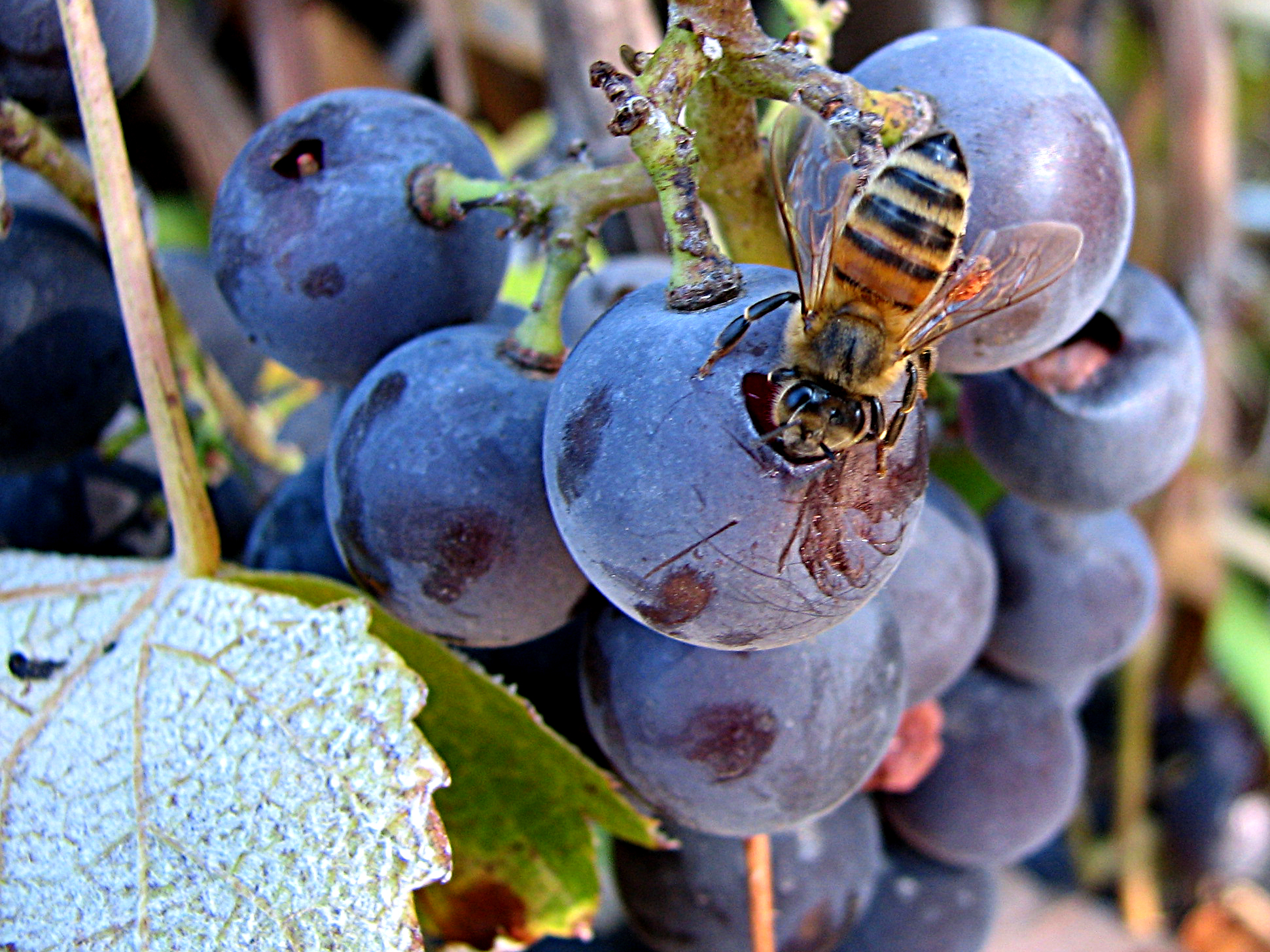
It is theorized that the grapevine developed aroma compounds as an evolutionary advancement to attract insects and animals to assist in pollination and dispersion of seeds.

The majority of volatile compounds responsible for aroma combine with sugars in the wine to form odourless glycosides. Through the process of hydrolysis, caused by enzymes or acids in the wine, they revert to an aromatic form. The act of tasting wine is essentially the act of smelling these vaporized aroma compounds. Olfactory receptors cells, each sensitive to a different aroma, pick up these compounds and transfer the information to the brain by way of the olfactory bulb. In the 1980s there was renewed focus in studying the correlation between aroma/flavor compounds in grapes and the resulting quality of wine. Scientists were able to use chromatograph – mass spectrometers to identify volatile aroma compounds in various grape varieties.

Study of the compounds responsible for aroma and flavour, as well as their correlation with a wine's quality, continues. As understanding of these compounds grows, there is concern that wines in the future could be "manipulated" through the use of chemical additives to add complexity and additional aromas to wine (such as creating a manufactured perfume). In 2004, a winery in South Africa was found to have added illegal flavouring to their Sauvignon blanc to enhance the aroma. Viticultural studies have focused on how aroma compounds develop in the grapes during the annual growth cycle of the vine and how viticultural techniques such as canopy management may contribute to developing desirable aromatics in the wine.

=== Identified aroma compounds ===
Some of the identified aroma compounds include the following:

- Methoxypyrazine – grassy, herbaceous aroma compound associated with Cabernet Sauvignon and Sauvignon blanc.
- Monoterpenes – responsible for the floral aromatics of varieties like Gewürztraminer, Muscat and Riesling. Includes geraniol, linalool and nerol.
- Norisoprenoids – Carotenoid derived aromatic compounds that includes megastigmatrienone which produces some of the spice notes associated with Chardonnay and zingerone responsible for the different spice notes associated with Syrah. Other norisoprenoids include raspberry ketone which produces some of the raspberry aromas associated with red wine, damascenone which produces some of the rose oil aromas associated with Pinot noir, and vanillin.
- Thiols/mercaptans – sulfur-containing compounds that can produce an aroma of garlic and onion that is considered a wine fault. They have also been found to contribute to some of the varietal aromas associated with Cabernet Sauvignon, Gewürztraminer, Merlot, Muscat, Petit Manseng, Pinot blanc, Pinot gris, Riesling, Scheurebe, Semillon and Sylvaner.

=== Esters ===
Some of the aromas perceived in wine are from esters created by the reaction of organic acids and alcohols in the wine. Esters can develop during fermentation, with the influence of yeast, or later during aging by a chemical reaction called esterification. The precise yeast strain used during fermentation and temperature are two of the strongest indicators of what kind of esters will develop and helps explain partially why Chardonnay grown in the same vineyard but made by two different producers could have different aromatics. During bottle aging hydrogen ions, found in higher concentration in low pH (high acid) wines, serves as a catalyst in the formation of esters from carboxylic acids and alcohols present in the wine. However, at the same time these hydrogen ions encourage esters to also split apart back into acids and alcohols. This creates many different types of carboxylic acids and alcohols at different times in the wines evolution which are then able to recombine with a different acid or alcohol. Each unique combination of alcohol and carboxylic acid produces a unique ester. During this period the ester influenced bouquet of the wine is dynamic and constantly changing. This is partly the reason why a wine will have one set of aromas at one time and other aromas later in its life.

== In wine tasting ==
The sense of smell and detecting the aromas in wine is the primary means through which wine is tasted and evaluated. Prior to tasting the wine, wine drinkers will often smell the wine in the glass. Large bowl glasses with tapered openings, some of which are specifically designed to enhance aromatics of different wines, can assist in capturing more aromatics within the glass for the drinker to detect. Wines served at warmer temperatures will be more aromatic than wine served cooler due to heat's ability to increase the volatility of aromatic compounds in the wine. Swirling, or aerating, the wine will increase available surface area, increasing the rate at which aroma molecules volatilize. Some subtle aromatics can be overwhelmed by more dominant aromatics that arise after swirling, so most professional tasters will sniff the wine briefly first before swirling. The closer the nose is to the wine, even right inside the glass, the greater chances of aromatics being captured. A series of short, quick sniffs versus one long inhale will also maximize the likelihood of aromatics being detected. The human nose starts to "fatigue" after around six seconds and so a pause may be needed between sniffs.

When wine is sipped, it is warmed in the mouth and mixes with saliva to vaporize the volatile aroma compounds. These compounds are then inhaled "retro-nasally" through the back of the mouth to where it is received by nearly five million nerve cells. The average human can be trained to distinguish thousands of smells but can usually only name a handful at a time when presented with many aromas. This phenomenon, known as the "tip of the nose phenomenon", is countered when a person is given a list of possible choices, through which they can often positively identify the aroma. Professional wine tasters will often mentally cycle through a list of potential aromas (and may use visual aids like the aroma wheel, developed by Ann C. Noble of University of California, Davis) until one choice stands out and can be identified in the wine.

Detecting an aroma is only part of wine tasting. The next step is to describe or communicate what that aroma is and it is in this step that the subjective nature of wine tasting appears. Different individuals have their own way of describing familiar scents and aromas based on their unique experiences. Furthermore, there are varying levels of sensitivity and recognition thresholds among humans of some aromatic compounds. This is why one taster may describe different aromas and flavours from another taster sampling the very same wine.

== See also ==
- Speyer wine bottle
