= Attractant =

Chemical that attracts an organism

An attractant is any chemical that attracts an organism, e.g. i) synthetic lures; ii) aggregation and sex pheromones (intraspecific interactions); and iii) synomone (interspecific interactions)

== Synomone ==
An interspecific semiochemical that is beneficial to both interacting organisms, the emitter and receiver, e.g. floral synomone of certain Bulbophyllum species (Orchidaceae) attracts fruit fly males (Tephritidae: Diptera) as pollinators. In this true mutualistic inter-relationship, both organisms gain benefits in their respective sexual reproduction - i.e. orchid flowers are pollinated and the Dacini fruit fly males are rewarded with a sex pheromone precursor or booster; and the floral synomones, also act as rewards to pollinators, are in the form of phenylpropanoids (e.g. methyl eugenol) and phenylbutanoids (e.g. raspberry ketone zingerone and anisyl acetone/a combination of the three phenylbutanoids.
