= Lomamyia fulva =

Scientific classification
- Domain: Eukaryota
- Kingdom: Animalia
- Phylum: Arthropoda
- Class: Insecta
- Order: Neuroptera
- Family: Berothidae
- Genus: Lomamyia
- Species: L. fulva

Binomial name
- Lomamyia fulva Carpenter, 1940

Species of lacewing

Lomamyia fulva is a species of beaded lacewing in the family Berothidae. It is found in North America.
