= Semiochemical =

Biological signaling substance

A semiochemical, from the Greek σημεῖον (semeion), meaning "signal", is a chemical substance or mixture released by an organism that affects the behaviors of other individuals. Semiochemical communication can be divided into two broad classes: communication between individuals of the same species (intraspecific) or communication between different species (interspecific).

It is usually used in the field of chemical ecology to encompass pheromones, allomones, kairomones, and synomones, as well as synthetic attractants and repellents.

Many insects, including parasitic insects, use semiochemicals. Pheromones are intraspecific signals that aid in finding mates, food and habitat resources, warning of enemies, and avoiding competition. Interspecific signals known as allomones and kairomones have similar functions.

== In nature ==
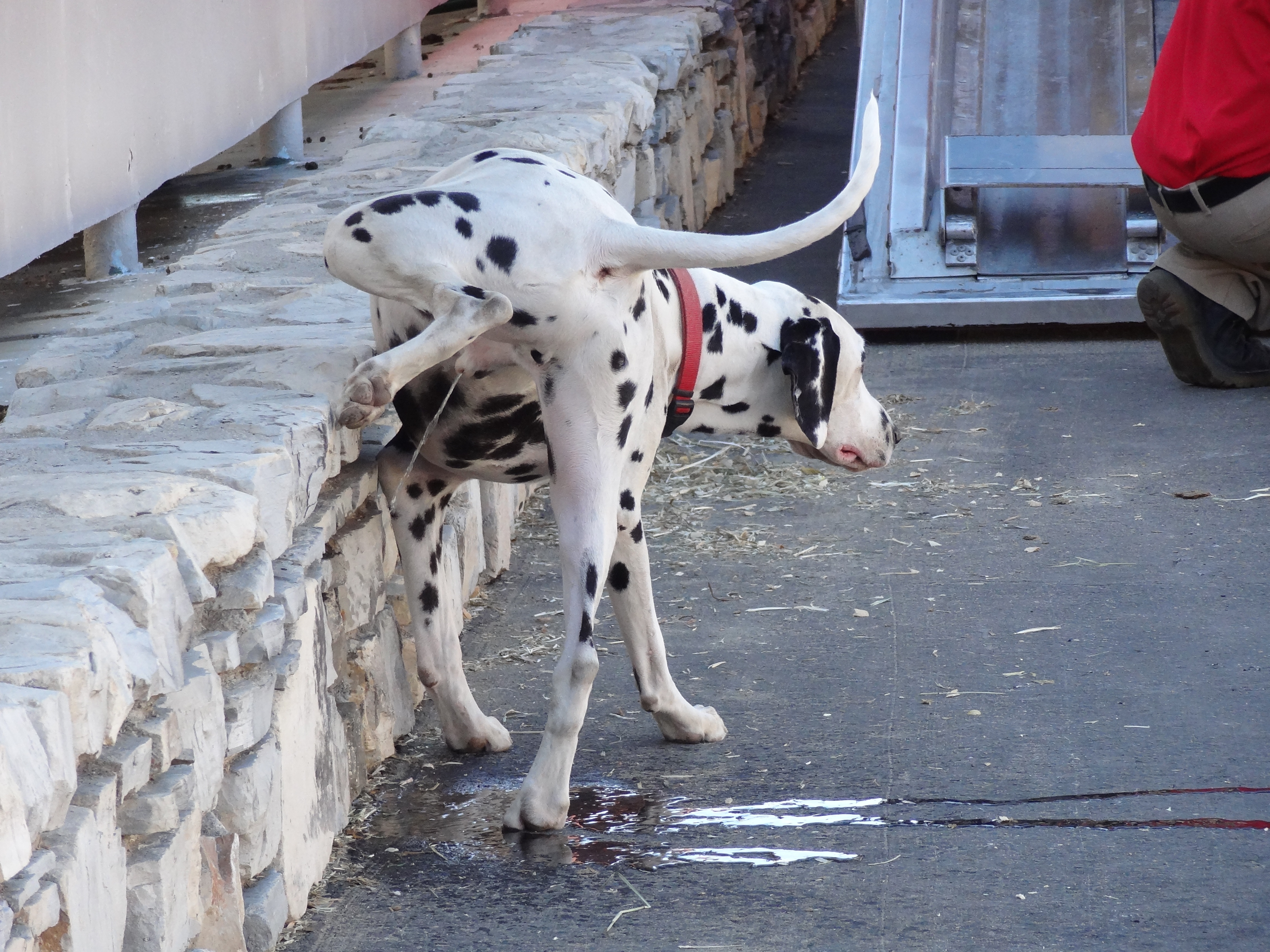
Dogs communicate with olfactory signals and mark their territories with urine.

=== Pheromone ===
A pheromone (from Greek phero "to bear" + hormone from Greek – "impetus") is a secreted or excreted chemical factor that triggers a social response in members of the same species. Pheromones are chemicals capable of acting outside the body of the secreting individual to impact the behavior of the receiving individual. There are alarm pheromones, food trail pheromones, sex pheromones, and many others that affect behavior or physiology. Their use among insects has been particularly well documented. In addition, some vertebrates and plants communicate by using pheromones. A notable example of pheromone usage to indicate sexual receptivity in insects can be seen in the female Dawson's burrowing bee, which uses a particular mixture of cuticular hydrocarbons to signal sexual receptivity to mating, and then another mixture to indicate sexual disinterest. These hydrocarbons, in association with other chemical signals produced in the Dufour's gland, have been implicated in male repulsion signaling as well.

The term "pheromone" was introduced by Peter Karlson and Martin Lüscher in 1959, based on the Greek word pherein (to transport) and hormone (to stimulate). They are also sometimes classified as ecto-hormones. German Biochemist Adolf Butenandt characterized the first such chemical, Bombykol (a chemically well-characterized pheromone released by the female silkworm to attract mates).

=== Allomone ===
An allomone is any chemical substance released by an individual of one species that affects the behavior of a member of another species to the benefit of the originator but not the receiver. Production of allomones is a common form of defense, such as by plant species against insect herbivores or prey species against predators. Sometimes species produce the sex pheromones of the organisms they exploit as prey or pollinators (such as bolas spiders and some orchids). Male sex pheromone of Dacini fruit flies, besides acting as aggregation pheromone to form lek, also acts as an allomone to deter lizard predation. The term "Allomone" was proposed by Brown, Eisner, and Whittaker to denote those substances which confer an advantage upon the emitter.

=== Kairomone ===
A kairomone is a semiochemical, emitted by an organism, which mediates interspecific interactions in a way that benefits an individual of another species which receives it, without benefitting the emitter. Two main ecological cues are provided by kairomones; they generally either indicate a food source for the receiver, or give warning of the presence of a predator. Often a pheromone may be utilized as a kairomone by a predator or parasitoid to locate the emitting organism.

=== Synomone ===
A synomone is an interspecific semiochemical that is beneficial to both interacting organisms, the emitter and receiver, e.g. floral synomone of certain Bulbophyllum species (Orchidaceae) attracts fruit fly males (Tephritidae: Diptera) as pollinators, so can be classed as an attractant. In this true symbiotic relationship, both organisms gain benefits in their respective sexual reproductive systems – i.e. orchid flowers are pollinated and the Dacini fruit fly males are rewarded with a sex pheromone precursor or booster. The floral synomone, also acts as a reward to pollinators, is either in the form of a phenylpropanoid (e.g. methyl eugenol) or a phenylbutanoid (e.g. raspberry ketone and zingerone).

Another example of a synomone is trans-2-hexenal, emitted by trees in the Mimosa / Acacia clade of the Fabaceae. These trees form distinctive hollow structures in which ants nest. When a leaf is disrupted by an herbivore, the damaged cells emit trans-2-hexenal (among other volatiles), which is detected by the ants. The ants swarm to the herbivore, biting and stinging to defend their host plant. The tree repays them in turn by providing sugary nectar and fat- and protein-rich Beltian bodies to feed the ant colony.

== Human use ==
=== Applications in pest management ===
The goals of using semiochemicals in pest control are to monitor pest populations to determine if control is warranted and to alter the behavior of the pest or its enemies to the detriment of the pest. In general, the advantages of using semiochemicals are:

1. they have adverse effects only on target pests,
2. they are relatively nontoxic and required in low amounts,
3. they are nonpersistent and environmentally safe,
4. they appear difficult for insects to develop resistance against. Monitoring of pest populations with pheromones is often integrated in management programs.

These properties have been demonstrated in several field applications. Pheromone-baited traps are commonly used to detect the arrival of invasive insect species; for example, a five-component pheromone lure developed for the invasive fruit pest spotted wing drosophila (Drosophila suzukii) enabled its first detection in South Africa in 2022, and subsequent monitoring networks using the same lure have since tracked its spread across the country.

Pheromones can also be used for mating disruption, in which synthetic pheromone is released throughout a crop to prevent males from locating females, reducing successful mating without directly killing insects. This technique has been shown to be effective against tortricid moth pests such as the false codling moth (Thaumatotibia leucotreta) in stone fruit and table grape orchards.

Identifying the chemical structure of a species' pheromone is often the first step toward developing such monitoring or disruption tools. For example, chemical and electrophysiological analysis confirmed that pine emperor moth populations in South Africa, previously treated as two separate species (Nudaurelia cytherea and N. clarki), share the same primary sex pheromone component, (Z)-dec-5-en-1-yl-3-methylbutanoate, opening the possibility of a single pheromone-based monitoring or mating-disruption tool for both populations.

Studies assessing the environmental safety of semiochemical lures have generally supported these low-toxicity claims: a study of a five-component volatile-organic-compound lure used to monitor African bollworm (Helicoverpa armigera) in South African tomato fields found no significant influence of the lure's constituent compounds on the naturally occurring background volatile organic compounds already present in the crop.
