= Paradol =

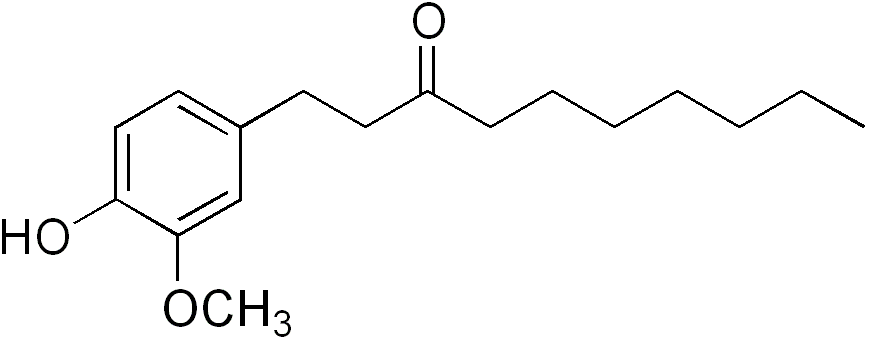

Names
- Preferred IUPAC name 1-(4-Hydroxy-3-methoxyphenyl)decan-3-one
- Other names [6]-Paradol

Identifiers
CAS Number	27113-22-0
3D model (JSmol)	Interactive image
ChemSpider	85173
ECHA InfoCard	100.043.829
EC Number	248-228-1
KEGG	C10482
MeSH	C421614
PubChem CID	94378
UNII	BO24ID7E9U
CompTox Dashboard (EPA)	DTXSID90181574
- InChI: InChI=1S/C17H26O3/c1-3-4-5-6-7-8-15(18)11-9-14-10-12-16(19)17(13-14)20-2/h10,12-13,19H,3-9,11H2,1-2H3 Key: CZNLTCTYLMYLHL-UHFFFAOYSA-N; InChI=1/C17H26O3/c1-3-4-5-6-7-8-15(18)11-9-14-10-12-16(19)17(13-14)20-2/h10,12-13,19H,3-9,11H2,1-2H3 Key: CZNLTCTYLMYLHL-UHFFFAOYAE
- SMILES: CCCCCCCC(=O)CCC1=CC(=C(C=C1)O)OC

Properties
Chemical formula	C_{17}H_{26}O_{3}
Molar mass	278.39 g/mol
- Except where otherwise noted, data are given for materials in their standard state (at 25 °C [77 °F], 100 kPa). verify (what is ?) Infobox references

Paradol is the active flavor constituent of the seeds of Guinea pepper (Aframomum melegueta or grains of paradise). It is also found in ginger. Paradol has been found to have antioxidant and antitumor promoting effects in a mouse model.

It is used in flavors as an essential oil to give spiciness.

== See also ==
- Gingerol
- Shogaol
