= Lomamyia latipennis =

Scientific classification
- Domain: Eukaryota
- Kingdom: Animalia
- Phylum: Arthropoda
- Class: Insecta
- Order: Neuroptera
- Family: Berothidae
- Genus: Lomamyia
- Species: L. latipennis

Binomial name
- Lomamyia latipennis Carpenter, 1940

Species of insect

Lomamyia latipennis is a species of insect in the family Berothidae. The larvae feed on termites which they subdue with an aggressive allomone. The first instar approaches termites and waves the tip of its abdomen near the termites' head. The termite becomes immobile after 1 to 3 minutes, and completely paralyzed very soon after this, although it may live for up to 3 hours. The berothid then feeds on the paralyzed prey. The later instars feed in a similar manner and are able to paralyze multiple termites at the same time. Contact between the termite and the berothid is not necessary for subduing, and other insects present are not affected by the allomone. Adult berothid lacewings are not predatory and feed on nectar like most lacewings. However, female berothids lay egg clusters on logs, stumps or trees infested with termites. The tiny, newly hatched larvae crawl across the wood seeking cracks and crevices that will lead to the termites within.
