= Lomamyia longicollis =

Scientific classification
- Kingdom: Animalia
- Phylum: Arthropoda
- Class: Insecta
- Order: Neuroptera
- Family: Berothidae
- Genus: Lomamyia
- Species: L. longicollis

Binomial name
- Lomamyia longicollis (Walker, 1853)

Species of insect

Lomamyia longicollis is a species of beaded lacewing in the family Berothidae. It is found in North America.
