= Lomamyia squamosa =

Scientific classification
- Domain: Eukaryota
- Kingdom: Animalia
- Phylum: Arthropoda
- Class: Insecta
- Order: Neuroptera
- Family: Berothidae
- Genus: Lomamyia
- Species: L. squamosa

Binomial name
- Lomamyia squamosa Carpenter, 1940

Species of lacewing

Lomamyia squamosa is a species of beaded lacewing in the family Berothidae. It is found in North America.
