= Chemical mimicry =

Biological mimicry using chemicals

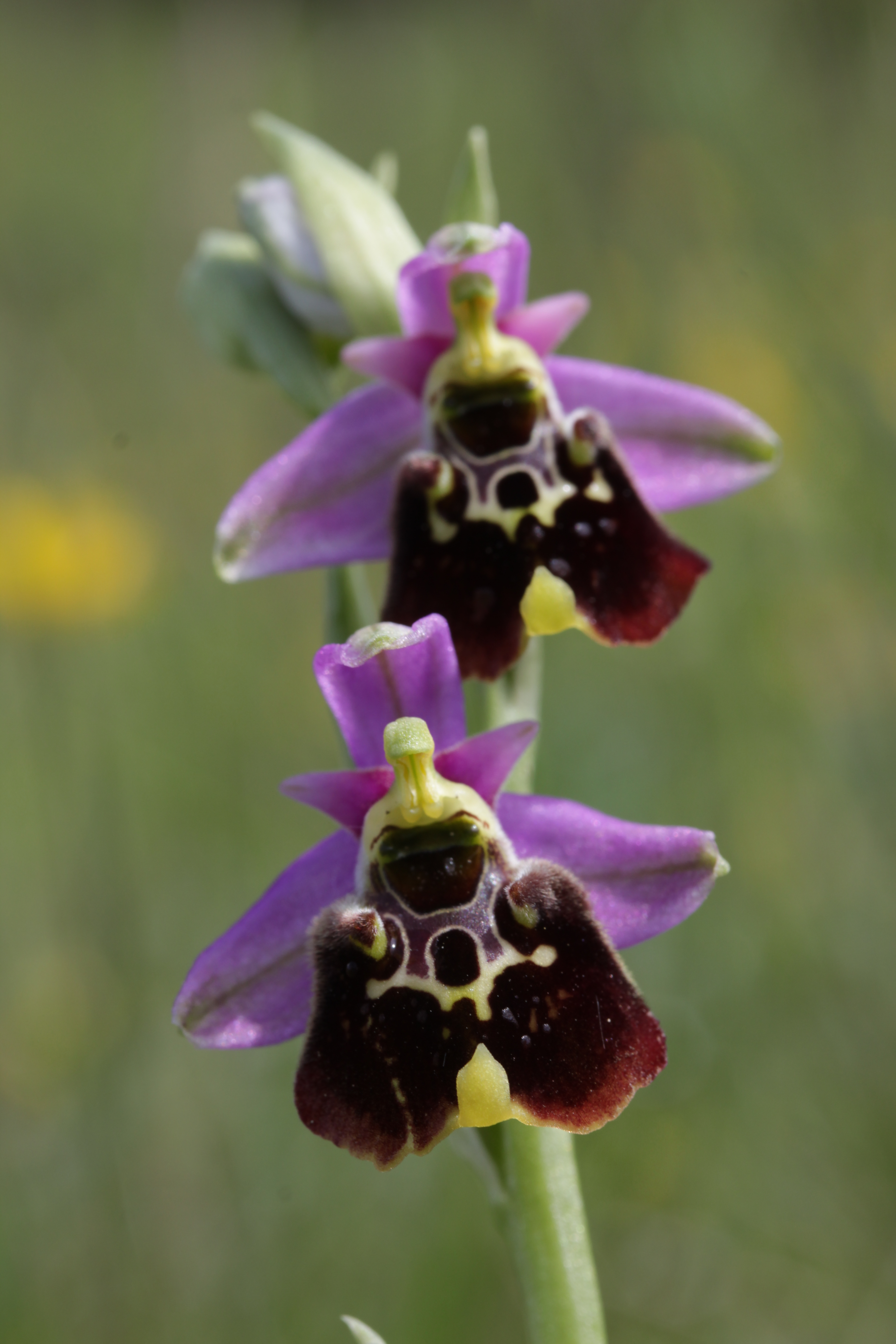
Spider orchids mimic the odours of female mining bees

Chemical mimicry (or molecular mimicry) is a type of biological mimicry involving the use of chemicals to dupe an operator.

A chemical mimic dupes an operator (e.g. a predator) by showing an adaptive chemical resemblance to an object of its environment and as a consequence receives selective advantage. In all cases of chemical mimicry it has been found that the mimicking species is the only species to benefit from the reaction with either costs or no effect on the duped species.

This is by adapting to produce chemicals (ex: allomones, pheromones, odours, etc.) that will cause a desirable behavioural reaction in the species being deceived and a selective advantage to the mimic, as in ant mimicry. Chemical mimicry exists within many of the different forms of mimicry such as aggressive, protective, Batesian, and Müllerian mimicry and can involve a number of different senses.

Mimicking semiochemicals make up some of the most widely used forms of chemical mimicry, but is less apparent than more visual forms. As a result, this topic has been relatively neglected in research and literature.

Two examples of organisms displaying chemical mimicry are the mimicking of Noctuid pheromones by bolas spiders to lure prey and the duping of insects within their own nests by mimicking their odours in order to enter and hide within the nest undetected.

== Classification ==
Chemical mimicry exists in many forms and for a variety of uses. It may be classified by the function it performs for the mimicking species and the effect that the mimic will have on the species that is deceived. It can be used for such functions as deterring predators, drawing prey, to allow a parasite to deceive a host species, or to help assist in the reproduction of an organism.

=== Aggressive mimicry ===
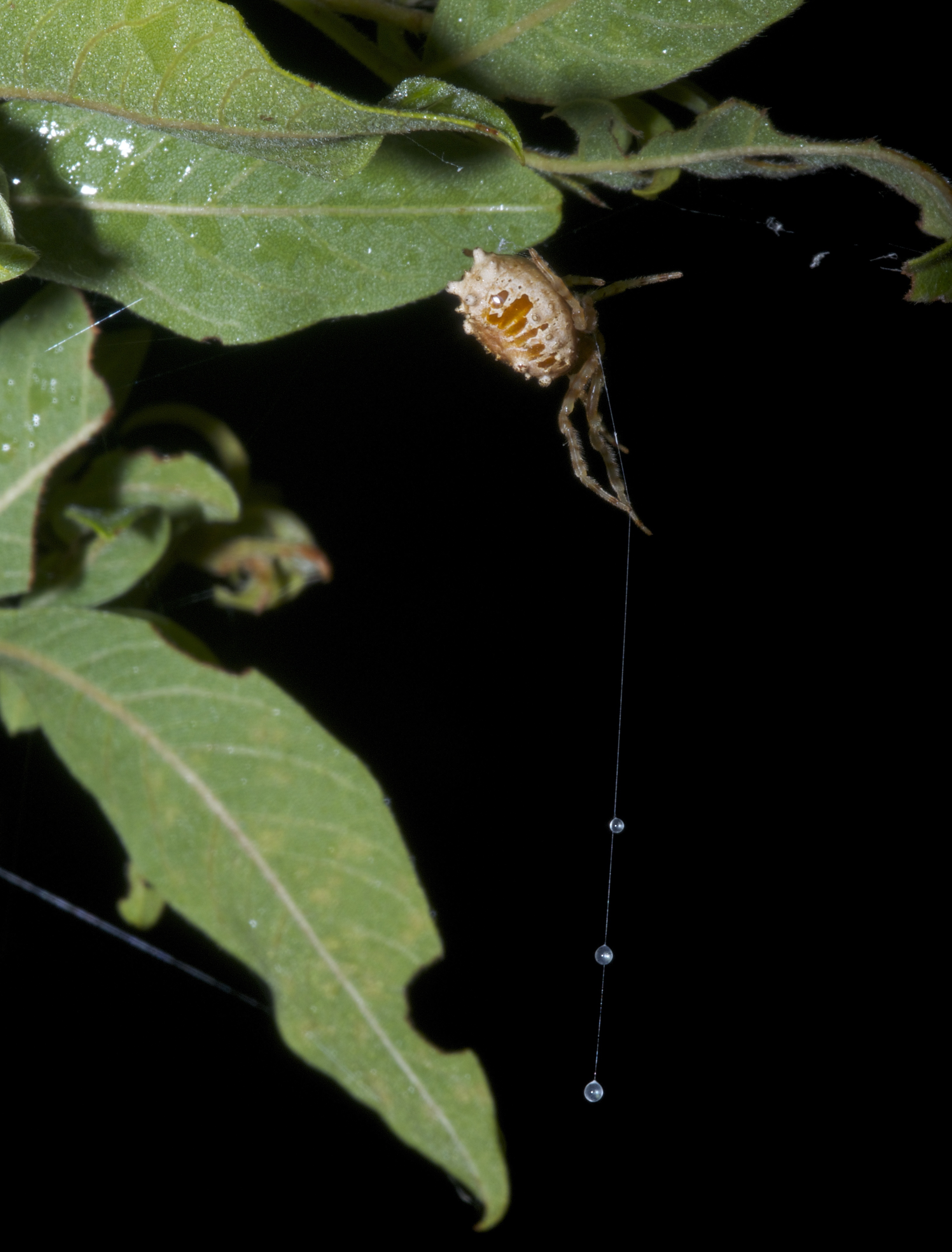
Bolas spiders emit chemicals to attract prey (Noctuid moths)

Aggressive mimicry through the use of chemicals is used among a wide variety of animals. It functions to either lure the deceived organism to the deceiver or it allows for the organism to accept the presence of a parasite. The chemical mimicry used by parasites allows for the deceived organism to accept the presence of the deceiver while they benefit from either taking up food supplies or directly preying on the host species from within their nest.

==== Predator ====
Chemical mimicry of an organism's pheromones allows predators with this ability to draw select prey to them, rather than spend their energy finding and attempting to capture these organisms with varied success. The pheromones are typically used by the prey species to attract members of their own species as potential mates. In the case of predatory chemical mimicry, the predator has evolved to emit chemicals that are structurally similar and will cause the same behavioural reactions to be displayed by the prey. However, the mimicked pheromones will draw the animal toward the predator rather than a potential mate.

One group of organisms that use this method are Bolas spiders (genus: Mastophora). Bolas spiders emit chemicals that attract their prey, noctuid moths. These spiders have replaced the need to spin elaborate webs to capture prey by mimicking the pheromones emitted by female moths to attract males of the species effectively. In studies conducted on this spider it has been found that the moths only approach from downwind of the spider and that all of the moths captured were, in fact, male.

==== Parasites ====
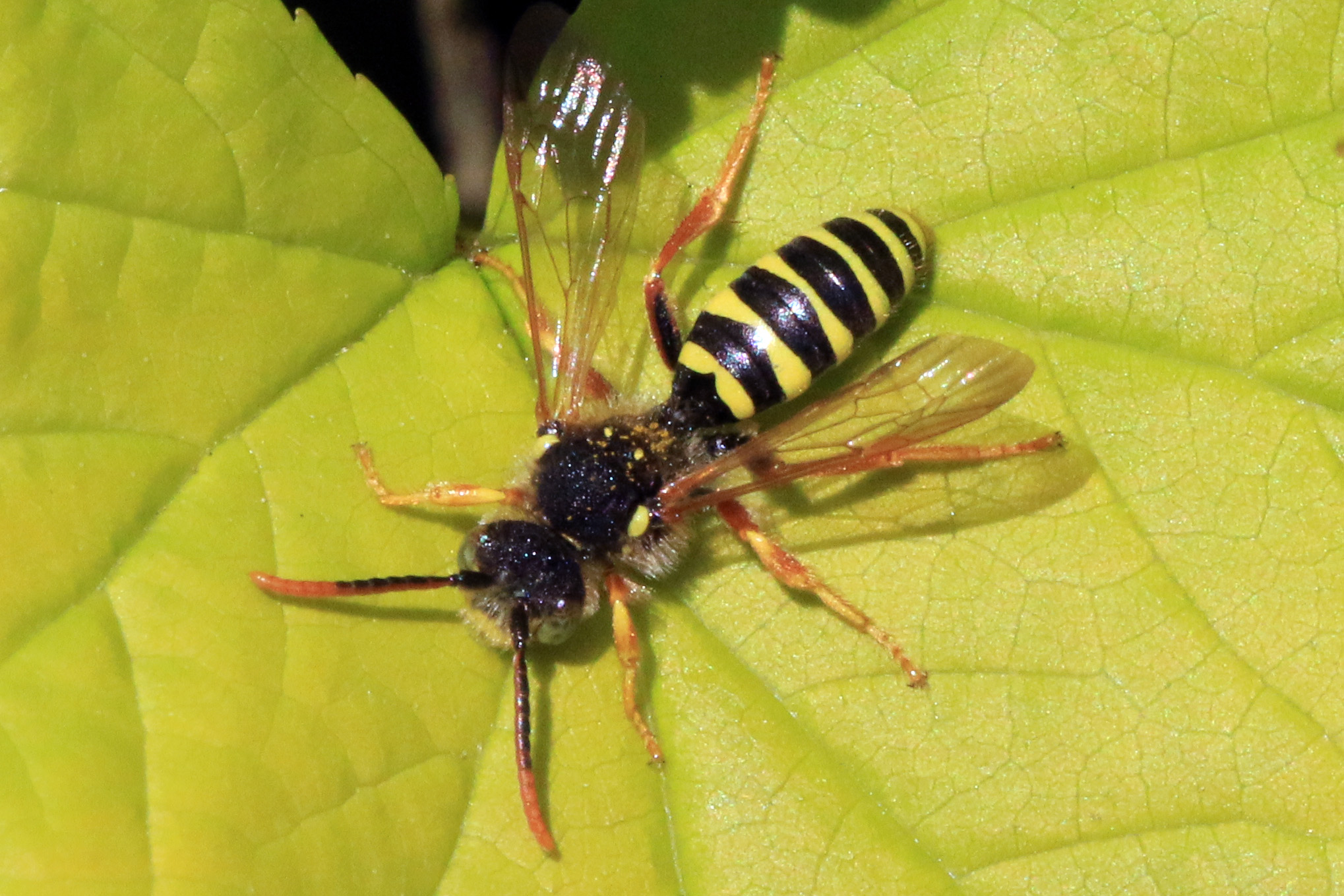
Cuckoo bees mimic the eggs of other bee species and shift parental care onto hosts

Parasitic use of chemical mimicry involves the invasion of the nest of a duped species, which may consist of an individual or a colony. By emitting mimics of the chemicals that create the host's familiar odours the invader is able to conceal themselves efficiently within the nest without alerting the host.

One example of a group of insects that uses this method of chemical mimicry would be cuckoo bees (genus: Nomada). Cuckoo bees will parasitize bees of the families Melittidae and Andrenidae. Cuckoo bee males will produce chemicals that are similar in structure to the volatile lipids secreted by host females and these chemicals are transferred to cuckoo females so that they may camouflage their eggs within the host's nest. This would allow the females to pass off the care of her eggs and larvae onto the host, benefiting the parasite and burdening the host.

=== Protective ===
Protective forms of chemical mimicry work to benefit the mimicking species by preventing harm. In most cases this achieved by acting as a deterrent to other organisms by mimicking the chemicals emitted by another species that has a mechanism to deter predators. This can be either Batesian Mimicry or Müllerian mimicry.

==== Batesian Mimicry ====
In Batesian mimicry, potential prey organisms will mimic chemicals emitted by an organism that poses a greater risk to the predator in order to deter attack. Most commonly this form of chemical mimicry is seen in plant species through the release of mimicked defense chemicals. The organism being mimicked may contain noxious chemicals used to deter predators from consuming them as it will lead to the predator becoming ill. By using Batesian mimicry the operator will mimic a chemical aspect, such as “defense signals" used by plants, in order to deceive the herbivore or predator into avoiding an edible organism.

=== Reproductive ===
Chemical mimicry can also have benefits on the reproductive success of the operator. This form is used primarily by flowers in order to deceive pollinators. There are two main types, the first being pseudocopulation which involves attracting male pollinators by mimicking the pheromones of females of the species. The second type involves female plants mimicking the chemical signals of males of the same species. By doing this the female plant is able to draw more pollinators despite not producing the pollen that the animal is looking for.

==== Pseudocopulation ====
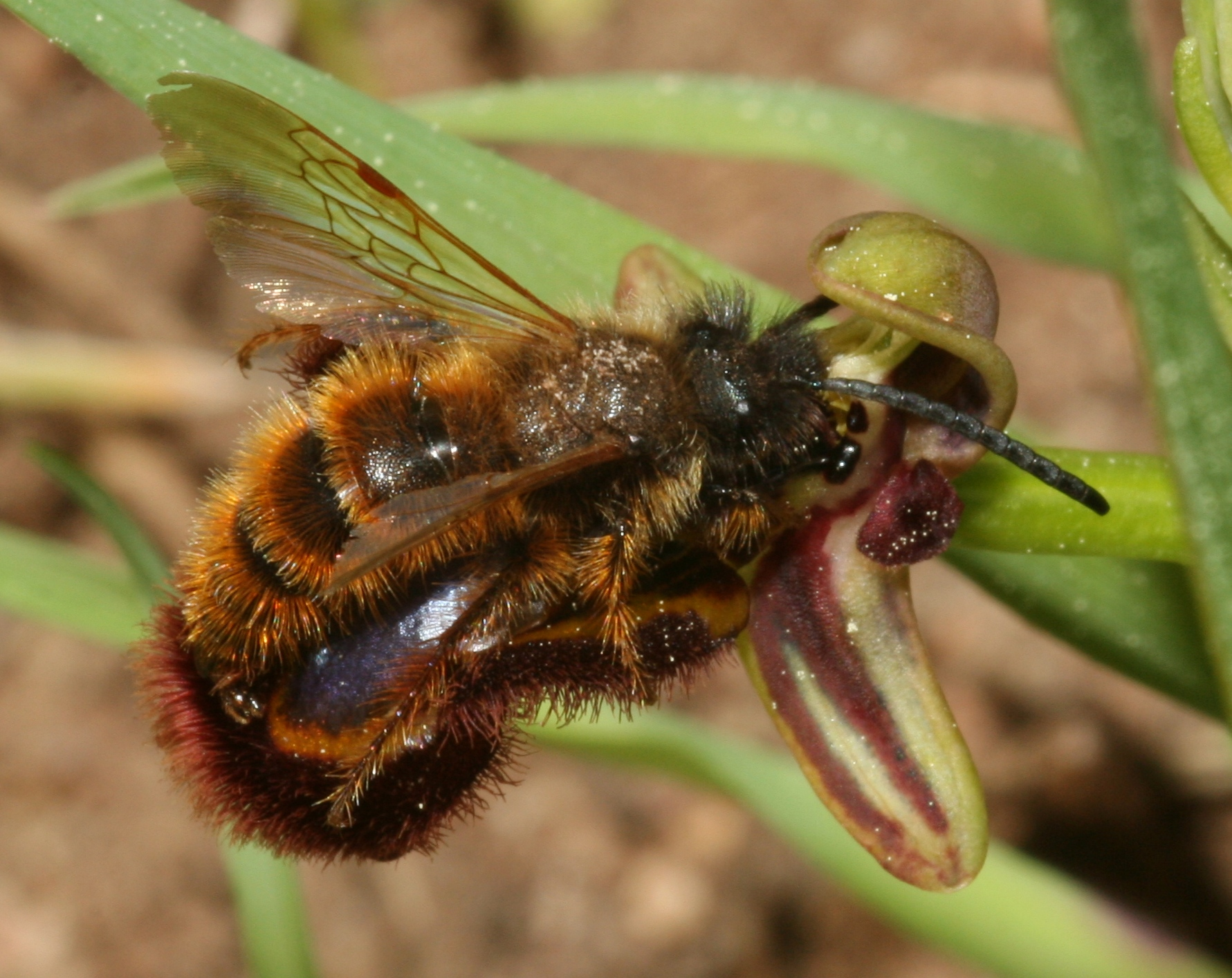
A scoliid wasp pseudo-copulating with orchid

Pseudocopulation is achieved when a flower successfully mimics the appearance and the pheromones emitted by the female of an insect species. The chemicals emitted by the mimicking species work to draw these pollinators to the plant and increase the number of visits to and time spent on the flower. This increases the chances that pollen will efficiently stick to the organism or that pollen already stuck to it is transferred to the plant.

In one study on mining bees (Andrena nigroaenea) and spider orchids (Ophrys sphegodes Mill.) it was found that unpollinated spider orchids emitted odours that consisted of hydrocarbons that were an exact match for the odours released by virgin female bees. As a result, male mining bees are extremely attracted to the flowers of the spider orchid, triggering more quick visits to the flower and in some cases the male bees attempt copulation, either getting themselves sufficiently covered in pollen or successfully transferring it to another plant.

== See also ==
- Allomone
- Pollination
