= Lomamyia flavicornis =

Scientific classification
- Kingdom: Animalia
- Phylum: Arthropoda
- Clade: Pancrustacea
- Class: Insecta
- Order: Neuroptera
- Family: Berothidae
- Genus: Lomamyia
- Species: L. flavicornis

Binomial name
- Lomamyia flavicornis (Walker, 1853)

Synonyms
- Lomamyia nearctica Navás, 1913

Species of lacewing

Lomamyia flavicornis is a species of beaded lacewing in the family Berothidae. It is found in North America.
