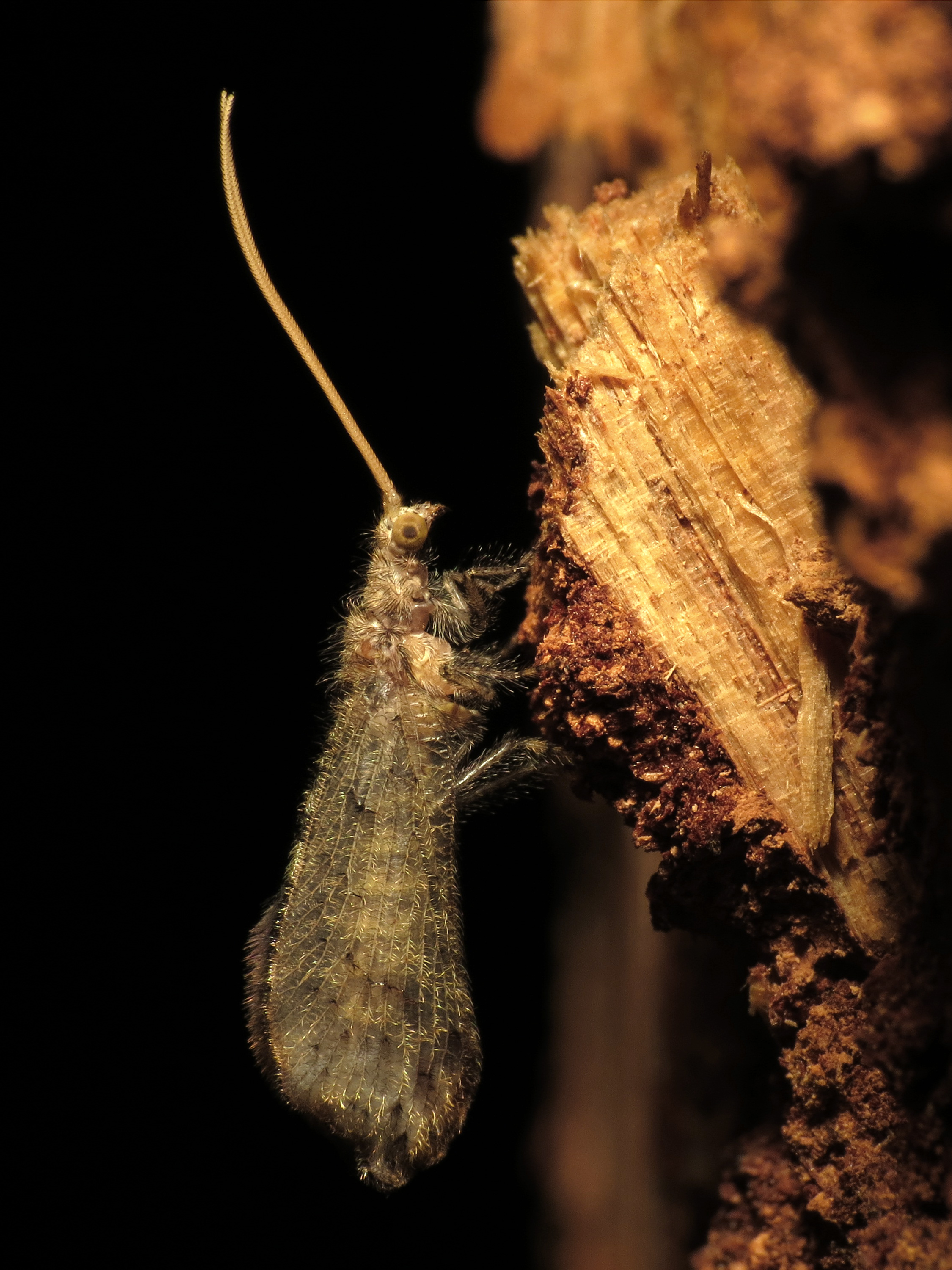

Scientific classification
- Kingdom: Animalia
- Phylum: Arthropoda
- Clade: Pancrustacea
- Class: Insecta
- Order: Neuroptera
- Family: Berothidae
- Subfamily: Berothinae
- Genus: Lomamyia; Banks, 1904

= Lomamyia =

Genus of lacewings

Lomamyia is a genus of beaded lacewings in the family Berothidae. There are about 11 described species in Lomamyia.

== Biology ==
Larvae of Lomamyia are predatory upon termites, and they have been shown to incapacitate their prey using a chemical sprayed from their anus.

== Species ==
These 11 species belong to the genus Lomamyia:

- Lomamyia banksi Carpenter, 1940
- Lomamyia flavicornis (Walker, 1853)
- Lomamyia fulva Carpenter, 1940
- Lomamyia hamata (Walker, 1853)
- Lomamyia latipennis Carpenter, 1940
- Lomamyia longicollis (Walker, 1853)
- Lomamyia occidentalis (Banks in Baker, 1905)
- Lomamyia squamosa Carpenter, 1940
- Lomamyia tenuis Carpenter, 1940
- Lomamyia texana (Banks, 1897)
- Lomamyia trombetensis Penny, 1985
