= Dehydrozingerone =

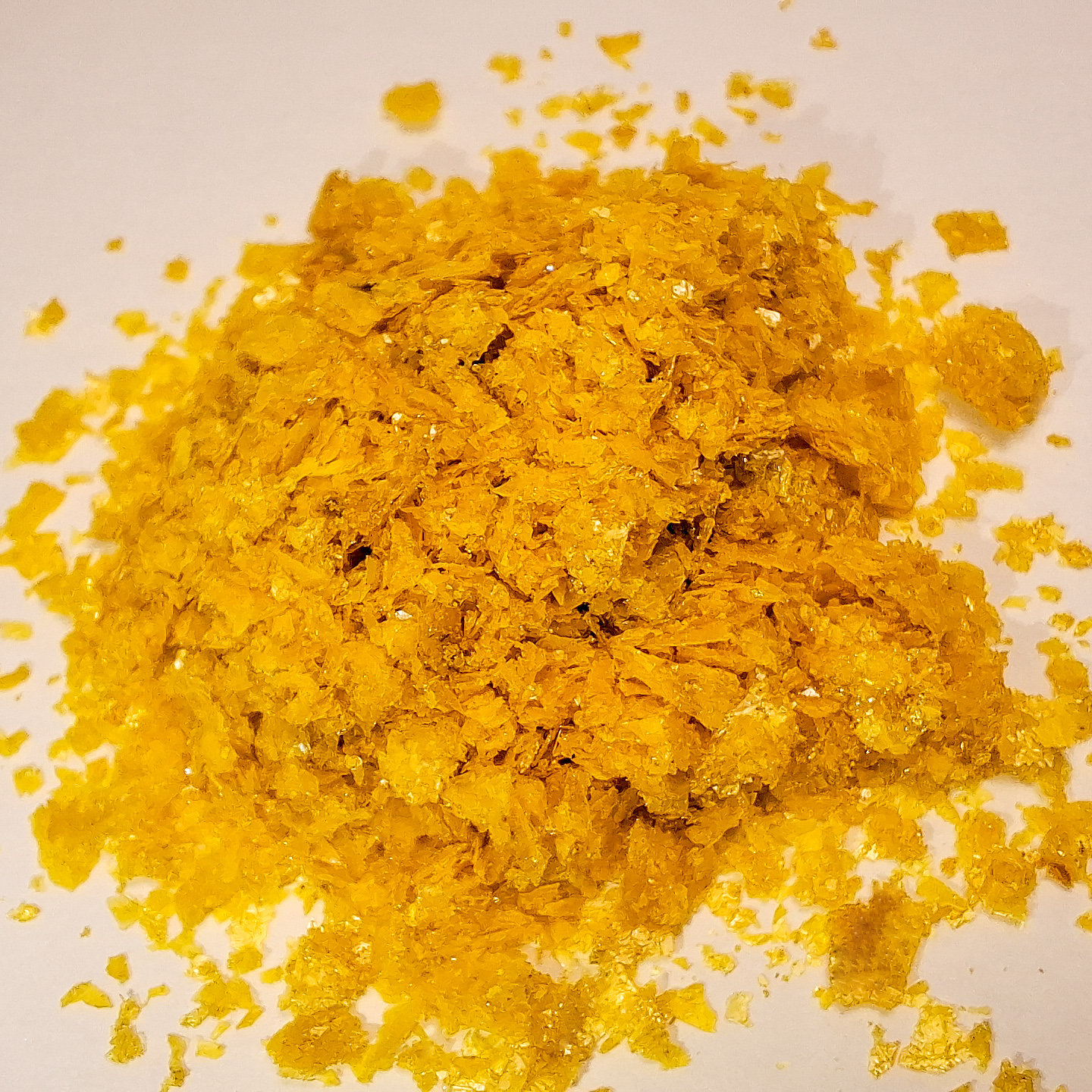

Names
- IUPAC name (E)-4-(4-Hydroxy-3-methoxyphenyl)but-3-en-2-one
- Other names: Vanillylidene acetone; Vanillidene acetone; Vanillylidenacetone; Vanillalacetone; Dehydrogingerone

Identifiers
CAS Number	1080-12-2
3D model (JSmol)	Interactive image
ChEBI	CHEBI:81361
ChEMBL	ChEMBL106509
ChemSpider	4510464
EC Number	214-096-9
KEGG	C17840
PubChem CID	5354238
UNII	8CJX5I27B7
- InChI: InChI=1S/C11H12O3/c1-8(12)3-4-9-5-6-10(13)11(7-9)14-2/h3-7,13H,1-2H3/b4-3+ Key: AFWKBSMFXWNGRE-ONEGZZNKSA-N
- SMILES: CC(=O)/C=C/C1=CC(=C(C=C1)O)OC

Properties
Chemical formula	C_{11}H_{12}O_{3}
Molar mass	192.214 g·mol^{−1}
Appearance	Yellow-orange solid
Density	1.15 g/cm^{3}
Melting point	129-130 °C
Solubility in water	Practically insoluble in water. Soluble in Dimethyl Sulfoxide and Ethanol
- Except where otherwise noted, data are given for materials in their standard state (at 25 °C [77 °F], 100 kPa). Infobox references

Dehydrozingerone is a phenolic α,β-unsaturated ketone found in ginger (Zingiber officinale). It is studied for its antioxidant, antimicrobial and anti-inflammatory properties.

== Production ==
Dehydrozingerone is typically prepared by a base-catalyzed Claisen–Schmidt condensation of vanillin with acetone:

C_{8}H_{8}O_{3} + C_{3}H_{6}O → C_{11}H_{12}O_{3} + H_{2}O

== Uses ==
The preparative transformation is selective reduction to produce the saturated ketone zingerone:

C_{11}H_{12}O_{3} + H_{2} → C_{11}H_{14}O_{3}
