= Shogaol =

[6]-Shogaol

Names
- Preferred IUPAC name (4E)-1-(4-Hydroxy-3-methoxyphenyl)dec-4-en-3-one
- Other names: [6]-Shogaol; (E)-[6]-Shogaol; Enexasogaol

Identifiers
CAS Number	23513-13-5; 555-66-8 (non-specific)
3D model (JSmol)	Interactive image
ChEMBL	ChEMBL25948
ChemSpider	4445106
PubChem CID	5281794
UNII	83DNB5FIRF
- InChI: InChI=1S/C17H24O3/c1-3-4-5-6-7-8-15(18)11-9-14-10-12-16(19)17(13-14)20-2/h7-8,10,12-13,19H,3-6,9,11H2,1-2H3/b8-7+ Key: OQWKEEOHDMUXEO-BQYQJAHWSA-N; InChI=1/C17H24O3/c1-3-4-5-6-7-8-15(18)11-9-14-10-12-16(19)17(13-14)20-2/h7-8,10,12-13,19H,3-6,9,11H2,1-2H3/b8-7+ Key: OQWKEEOHDMUXEO-BQYQJAHWBO
- SMILES: CCCCCC=CC(=O)CCC1=CC(=C(C=C1)O)OC

Properties
Chemical formula	C_{17}H_{24}O_{3}
Molar mass	276.376 g·mol^{−1}
- Except where otherwise noted, data are given for materials in their standard state (at 25 °C [77 °F], 100 kPa). verify (what is ?) Infobox references

Shogaol
- Heat: Very hot (chemical)
- Scoville scale: 160,000 SHU

Shogaols are pungent constituents of ginger similar in chemical structure to gingerol. The most common of the group is [6]-shogaol. Like zingerone, it is produced when ginger is dried or cooked. Moreover, shogaol (and gingerol) are converted to other constituents when heat is applied over time, which is why ginger loses its spiciness as it is cooked.

The name shogaol is derived from the Japanese name for ginger (生姜、shōga).

Shogaol is rated 160,000 SHU on the Scoville scale. When compared to other pungent compounds, shogaol is moderately more pungent than piperine, but 100 times less than capsaicin.

Compound	Scoville Heat Units (SHU)
Capsaicin	16,000,000
[6]-Shogaol	160,000
Piperine	100,000
[6]-Gingerol	60,000

== Shogaols group ==
[4]-Shogaol, [8]-shogaol, [10]-shogaol, and [12]-shogaol (all found in ginger) together constitute the group shogaols. There also exist in ginger cultivars methylated shogaols: methyl [6]-shogaol and methyl [8]-shogaol, respectively.

Shogaols are artifacts formed during storage or through excess heat, probably created by a dehydration reaction of the gingerols. The ratio of shogaols to gingerols sometimes is taken as an indication of product quality.

[8]-shogaol

[10]-shogaol

== Synthesis ==
A possible synthesis starts with a Claisen condensation of vanillin and acetone, producing dehydrozingerone. Afterwards the product reacts in an aldol condensation with hexanal in tetrahydrofurane to 6-dehydroshogaol and 6-dehydrogingerol. Latter can be hydrogenated to [6]-gingerol by a catalyst. In the last step hydrochloric acid is added to get the desired [6]-shogaol.

Possible synthesis of [6]-shogaol starting from vanillin
