= Gingerol =

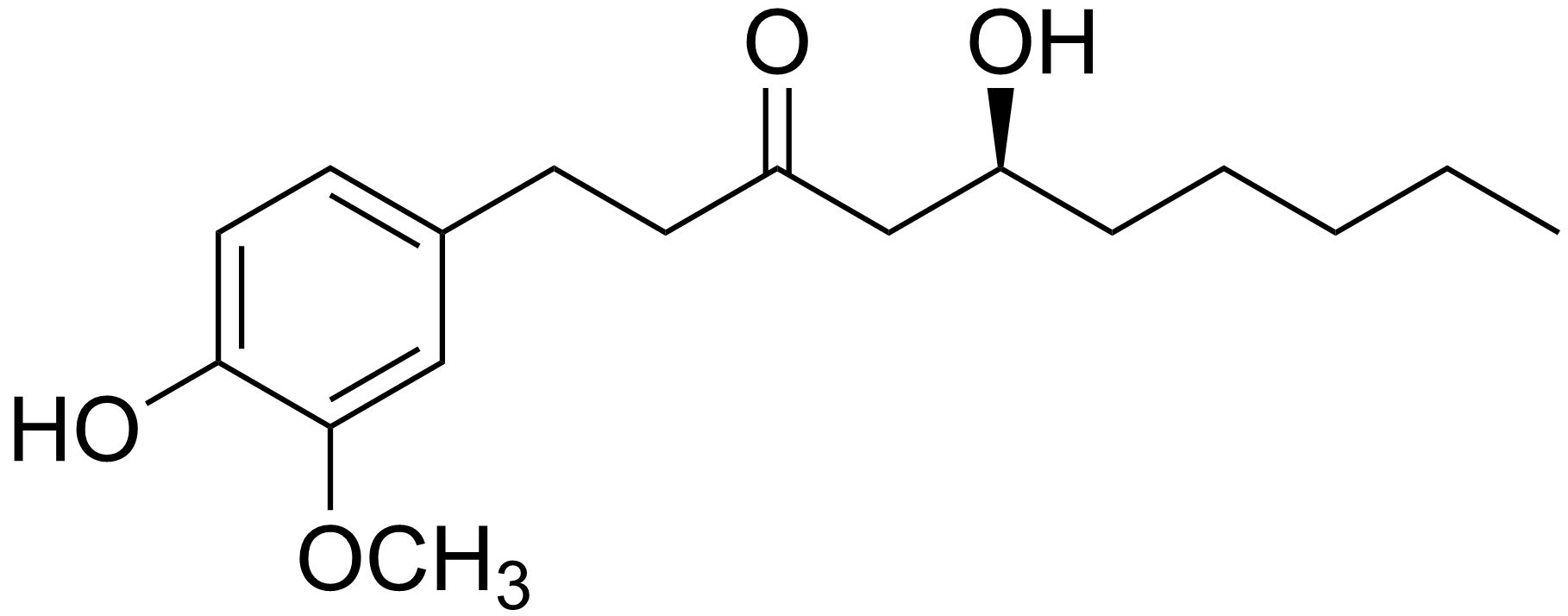
- Gingerol

Names
- Preferred IUPAC name (5S)-5-Hydroxy-1-(4-hydroxy-3-methoxyphenyl)decan-3-one
- Other names [6]-Gingerol; 6-Gingerol

Identifiers
CAS Number	23513-14-6
3D model (JSmol)	Interactive image
ChEBI	CHEBI:10136
ChEMBL	ChEMBL402978
ChemSpider	391126
ECHA InfoCard	100.131.126
KEGG	C10462
PubChem CID	442793
UNII	925QK2Z900
CompTox Dashboard (EPA)	DTXSID3041035
- InChI: InChI=1S/C17H26O4/c1-3-4-5-6-14(18)12-15(19)9-7-13-8-10-16(20)17(11-13)21-2/h8,10-11,14,18,20H,3-7,9,12H2,1-2H3/t14-/m0/s1 Key: NLDDIKRKFXEWBK-AWEZNQCLSA-N; InChI=1/C17H26O4/c1-3-4-5-6-14(18)12-15(19)9-7-13-8-10-16(20)17(11-13)21-2/h8,10-11,14,18,20H,3-7,9,12H2,1-2H3/t14-/m0/s1 Key: NLDDIKRKFXEWBK-AWEZNQCLBF
- SMILES: O=C(C[C@@H](O)CCCCC)CCc1cc(OC)c(O)cc1

Properties
Chemical formula	C_{17}H_{26}O_{4}
Molar mass	294.38 g/mol
Melting point	30 to 32 °C (86 to 90 °F; 303 to 305 K)
- Except where otherwise noted, data are given for materials in their standard state (at 25 °C [77 °F], 100 kPa). verify (what is ?) Infobox references

Gingerol
- Heat: Very hot (chemical)
- Scoville scale: 60,000 SHU

Gingerol ([6]-gingerol) is a phenolic phytochemical compound found in fresh ginger that activates heat receptors on the tongue. It is normally found as a pungent yellow oil in the ginger rhizome, but can also form a low-melting crystalline solid. This chemical compound is found in all members of the Zingiberaceae family and is high in concentrations in the grains of paradise as well as an African Ginger species.

Cooking ginger transforms gingerol via a reverse aldol reaction into zingerone, which is less pungent and has a spicy-sweet aroma. When ginger is dried or mildly heated, gingerol undergoes a dehydration reaction forming shogaols, which are about twice as pungent as gingerol. This is why dried ginger is more pungent than fresh ginger.

Ginger also contains [8]-gingerol, [10]-gingerol, and [12]-gingerol, collectively deemed gingerols.

== Physiological potential ==
In a pre-clinical meta-analysis of gingerol compounds anticancer, anti-inflammatory, anti-fungal, antioxidant, neuroprotective and gastroprotective properties were reported, which include studies in-vitro and in-vivo. A few in-vivo studies have proposed that gingerols facilitate healthy glucose regulation for diabetics. Many studies have been around the effects of gingerols on a wide range of cancers including leukemia, prostate, breast, skin, ovarian, lung, pancreatic and colorectal. There has not been much clinical testing to observe gingerols physiological impacts in humans.

While many of the chemical mechanisms associated with the effects of gingerols on cells have been thoroughly studied, few have been in a clinical setting. This is due to the high variability in natural phytochemicals and the lack of efficacy in research. Most herbal medicine, which include gingerols, are under the restrictions of the Food and Drug Administration in the United States and experimental methods have not held up to scrutiny which has decreased the value in phytochemical research. Herbal medicine is untested for quality assurance, potency and effectiveness in clinical settings due to a lack of funding in eastern medical research. Most research on [6]-Gingerol has been on either mouse subjects (in-vivo) or on cultured human tissue (in-vitro) and may be used in the future to discuss possible applications for multi-target disease control.

An investigation scrutinizing gingerol's anti-fungal capabilities remarked that an African species of ginger tested higher in both gingerol and shogaol compounds than the more commonly cultivated Indonesian relative. When tested for the anti-fungal properties the African ginger combated against 13 human pathogens and was three times more effective than the commercial Indonesian counterpart. It is thought that gingerol compounds work in tandem with the other phytochemicals present including shogaols, paradols and zingerone.

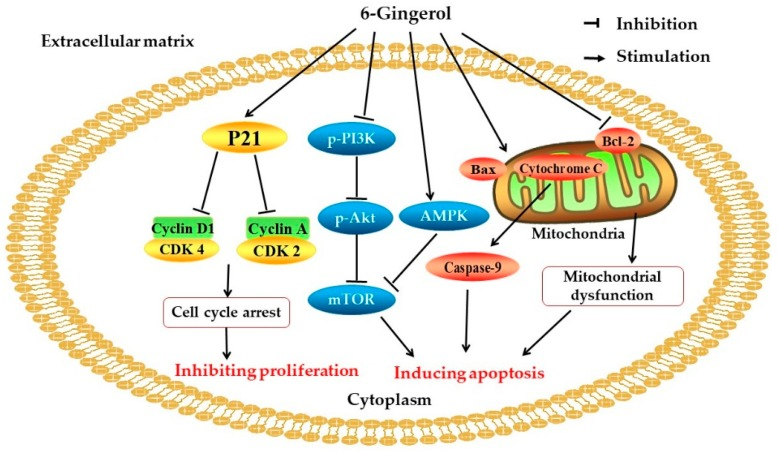
A few established cellular pathways effected by [6]-gingerol that result in apoptosis of a cancerous cell. ABBREVIATIONS: CDK: Cyclin-dependent kinase; PI3K: Phosphoinositide 3-kinase; Akt: Protein kinase B; mTOR: Mammalian target of rapamycin; AMPK: 5’adenosine monophosphate-activated protein kinase; Bax: Bcl-2-associated X protein; Bcl-2: B-cell lymphoma 2.

In a meta analysis looking at many different phytochemical effects on prostate cancer, two specific studies using mice observed [6]-gingerol compounds induced apoptosis in cancer cells by interfering with the mitochondrial membrane. There were also observed mechanisms associated with the disruption of G1 phase proteins to stop the reproduction of cancer cells which is also an associated benefit of other relevant anticancer studies. The main mechanism by which gingerol phytochemicals act on cancer cells seems to be protein disruption. The anti-carcinogenic activity of [6]-gingerol and [6]-paradol was analysed in a study observing the cellular mechanisms associated with mouse skin cancer which targeted the activator proteins associated with tumor initiation. Gingerol compounds inhibited the transformation of normal cells into cancer cells by blocking AP-1 proteins and when cancer did develop paradol encouraged apoptosis due to its cytotoxic activity. [6]-Gingerol exhibits cell cycle arrest capabilities, apoptotic action and enzyme-coupled cell signaling receptor degradation in cancer cells. Gingerol has been observed to stop proliferation through inhibiting the translation of Cyclin proteins necessary for replication during G1 and G2 phase of cell division. To promote apoptosis in cancer cells Cytochrome C is ejected from the mitochondria which ceases ATP production leaving a dysfunctional mitochondria. The Cytochrome C assembles an apoptosome which activates the Caspase-9 and initiates an executioner Caspase cascade, effectively breaking down DNA into histones and promoting apoptosis. [6]-Gingerol also inhibits the anti-apoptotic Bcl-2 proteins on the surface of mitochondria, which in turn increases the capabilities for the pro-apoptotic Bcl-2 proteins to initiate cell death. Cancer cells exhibit high amounts of growth hormone activator proteins that are expressed through enzyme-coupled signaling pathways. By halting the phosphorylation of PI-3-Kinase the Akt protein cannot bind with its PH domain, effectively deactivating the downstream signal. Successively keeping Bad proteins bound to anti-apoptotic proteins which keeps them from promoting cell growth, consequently, a double negative cellular signaling pathway to promote apoptosis.

Cultured human breast cancer cells were subjected to various concentrations of [6]-gingerol to determine the impacts on live cells. These concentration dependent results concluded that there was no impact at 5 μM but a reduction of 16% occurred at 10 μM. [6]-gingerol targeted three specific proteins in breast cancer cells that promote metastasis and while adhesion remained relatively unchanged, [6]-gingerol inhibited the cancer cells from invading and increasing in size. This study suggests the mechanism by which cancer cell growth was impacted was due to a reduction in specific mRNA that transcribes for extracellular degrading enzymes called matrix metalloproteinases (MMP's). An examination using human cells in-vitro displayed gingerols capabilities in combating oxidative stress. The results concluded that gingerol had anti-inflammatory effects though shogaol showed the most promising effects combating free radicals. There was an inverted dose- concentration response and as dosage concentration increased the amount of free radicals in cells decreased.

Cisplatin is a chemotherapy drug that if used in high dosages causes renal failure which is considered a limiting factor for this life saving drug. By using [6]-gingerol it prevented the occurrence of renal failure in rats. [6]-gingerol improved glutathione production in dose-dependent results which suggested that the higher a dosage the more of an effect [6]-gingerol had.

Gingerol compounds are thought to help in diabetic patients because of increases in glutathione, a cellular toxin regulatory factor. Anti-hyperglycaemic effects were studied in diabetic and severely obese mice. Gingerol compounds increased glucose uptake in cells without the need of a synthetic insulin activator, while also decreasing fasting glucose and increasing glucose tolerance. In a different study the exact metabolic mechanisms associated with the physiological benefits of gingerol phytochemicals concluded that there was increased enzyme activity (CAT) and glutathione production while decreasing lipoprotein cholesterol and improving glucose tolerance in mice. Cardio-arrhythmia is a common side effect of diabetic patients and the anti-inflammatory effects of gingerol suppressed the risks by lowering blood glucose levels in-vivo.

The anti-oxidant properties of [6]-gingerol has been considered as a defense against Alzheimer’s. A study observed the molecular mechanisms responsible for the protection against DNA fragmentation and mitochondrial membrane potential deterioration of cells which suggests a neuroprotective support of gingerol. This study indicates that ginger up-regulates glutathione production in cells, including nerve cells, through anti-oxidative properties which decreases the risk of Alzheimer's in human neuroblastoma cells and mouse hippocampal cells.

While many studies suggest the low risk of using ginger phytochemicals to combat oxidation damage to cells, there are a few studies that suggest potential genotoxic effects. In one study too high of a dose to human hepatoma cells resulted in DNA fragmentation, chromosomal damage and organelle membrane instability which could result in apoptotic behavior. There are some pro-oxidant behaviors to gingerol compounds when the concentration reaches high levels although also considered, in normal conditions these phytochemicals observed have anti-inflammatory and anti-oxidant qualities. In another study [6]-Gingerol notably inhibited the metabolic rate of rats when given an intraperitoneal injection which induced a hypothermic reaction though, when consumed orally in excess there were no changes in body temperature.

== Biosynthesis ==
Both ginger (Zingiber officinale) and turmeric (Curcuma longa) had been suspected to utilize phenylpropanoid pathway and produce putative type III polyketide synthase products based on the research of 6-gingerol biosynthesis by Denniff and Whiting in 1976 and by Schröder's research in 1997. 6-Gingerol is the major gingerol in ginger rhizomes and it possesses some interesting pharmacological activities like analgesic effect. While the biosynthesis of 6-gingerol is not fully elucidated, plausible pathways are presented here.

Proposed gingerol biosynthesis

In the proposed biosynthetic pathway, Scheme 1, L-Phe (1) is used as the starting material. It is converted into Cinnamic acid (2) via phenylalanine ammonia lyase (PAL). Then it is turned into p-Coumaric acid (3) with use of cinnamate 4-hydroxylase (C4H). 4-coumarate:CoA ligase (4CL) is then used to get p-Coumaroyl-CoA (5). P-Coumaroyl shikimate transferase (CST) is the enzyme that is responsible for the bonding of shikimic acid and p-Coumaroyl-CoA. The complexed (5) is then selectively oxidized at C3 by p-coumaroyl 5-O-shikimate 3'-hydroxylase (CS3'H) to alcohol. With another action of CST, shikimate is broken off from this intermediate, thereby yielding Caffeoyl-CoA (7). In order to get desired substitution pattern on the aromatic ring, caffeoyl-CoA O-methyltransferase (CCOMT) converts the hydroxyl group at C3 into methoxy as seen in Feruloyl-CoA (8). Up until this step, according to Ramirez-Ahumada et al., the enzyme activities are very active. It is speculated that some polyketide synthases (PKS) and reductases are involved in final synthesis of 6-Gingerol (10).

Alternative proposed pathway

Because it is unclear whether the methoxy group addition is performed before or after the condensation step of the polyketide synthase, alternative pathway is shown in Scheme 2, where methoxy group is introduced after PKS activity. In this alternative pathway, the enzymes involved are likely to be cytochrome p450 hydroxylases, and S-adenosyl-L-methionine-dependent O-methyltransferases (OMT). There are three possibilities for the reduction step by Reductase: directly after PKS activity, after PKS and Hydroxylase activity, or in the end after PKS, Hydroxylase, and OMT activity.
