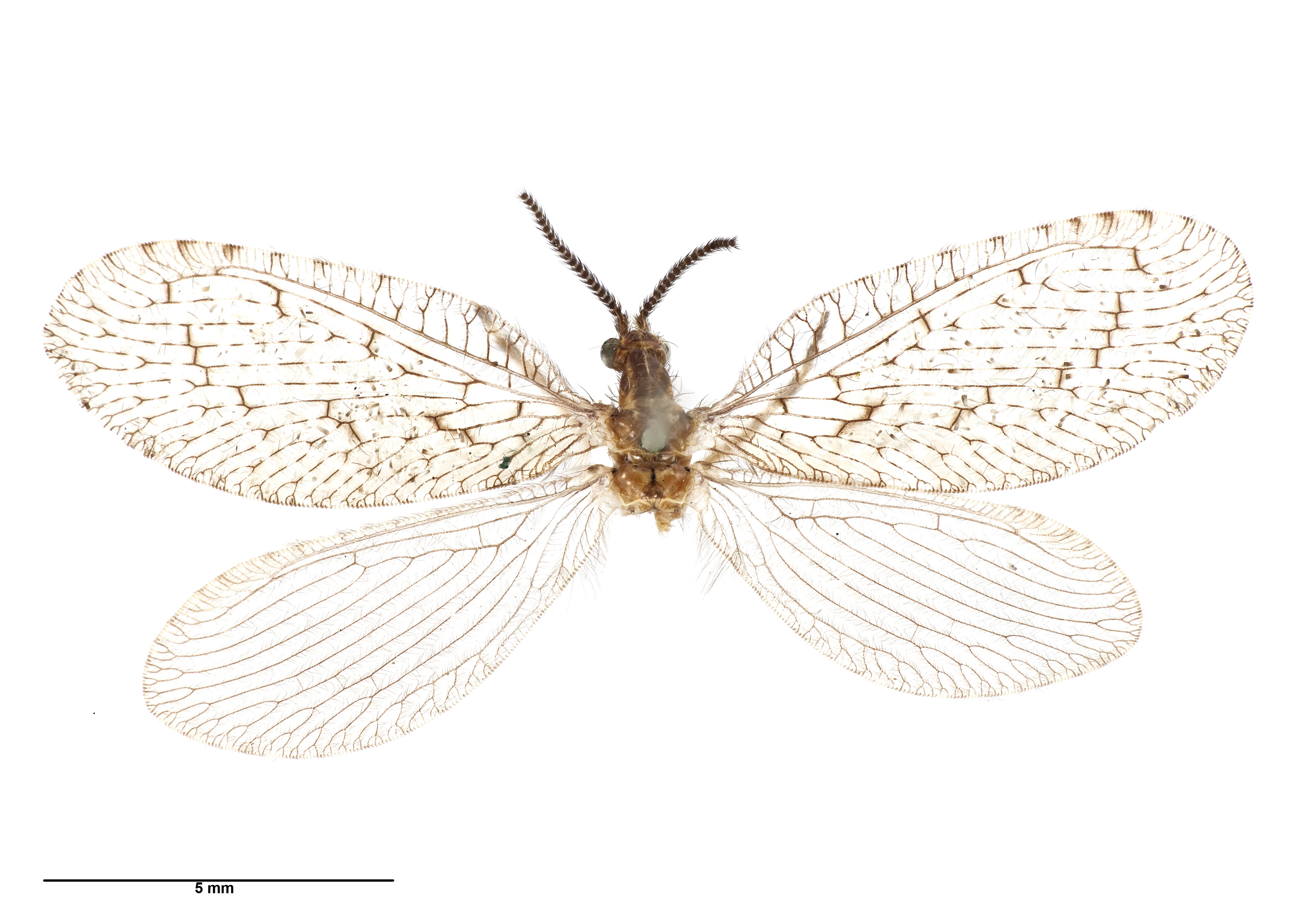

Scientific classification
- Domain: Eukaryota
- Kingdom: Animalia
- Phylum: Arthropoda
- Class: Insecta
- Order: Neuroptera
- Family: Berothidae
- Genus: Protobiella
- Species: P. zelandica

Binomial name
- Protobiella zelandica (Tillyard, 1923)

= Protobiella =

Species of insect

Protobiella zelandica is a species of New Zealand beaded lacewing in the family Berothidae that was first described by Robert John Tillyard in 1923. It is the sole known species in the genus Protobiella, and the only berothid endemic to New Zealand. No subspecies are noted in the Catalogue of Life.

== Description and ecology ==
The species is small and brown, and can be identified by the interrupted stripe of yellow-brown markings present on the head and thorax. The species' antenna appear to differ between sexes, with male lacewings having fewer than 40 flagellomeres on their antenna, compared to females who have more than 40.

The species has been documented predating on pine adelgidae.

== Distribution and habitat ==
Protobiella zelandica is found throughout the North Island and South Island.
