= Allomone =

Chemical communication between species that benefits the first but not the second

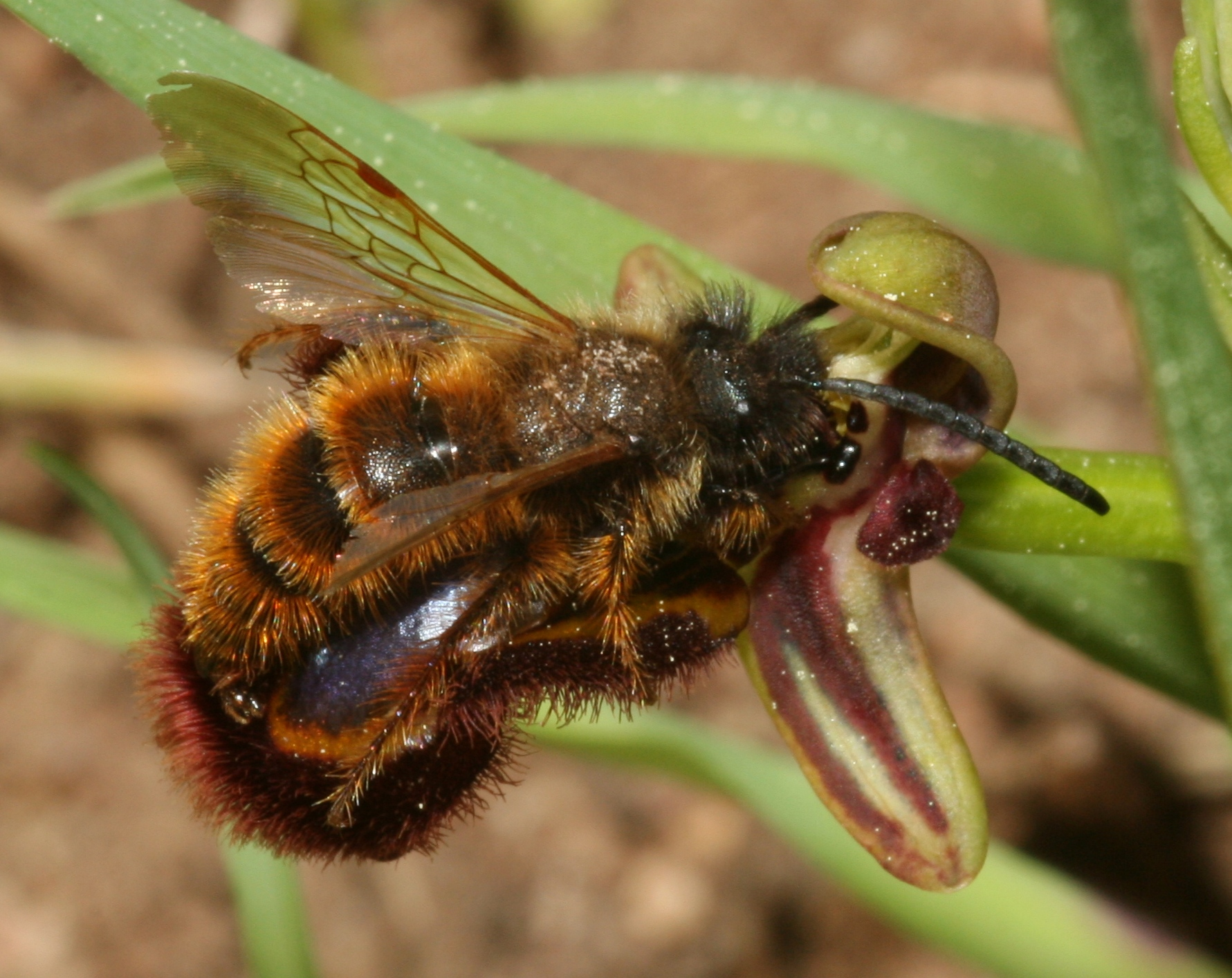
Dasyscolia ciliata on the flowers of Ophrys speculum

An allomone (from Ancient Greek ἄλλος allos "other" and pheromone) is a type of semiochemical produced and released by an individual of one species that affects the behaviour of a member of another species to the benefit of the originator but not the receiver. Production of allomones is a common form of defense against predators, particularly by plant species against insect herbivores. In addition to defense, allomones are also used by organisms to obtain their prey or to hinder any surrounding competitors.

Many insects have developed ways to defend against these plant defenses (in an evolutionary arms race). One method of adapting to allomones is to develop a positive reaction to them; the allomone then becomes a kairomone. Others alter the allomones to form pheromones or other hormones, and yet others adopt them into their own defensive strategies, for example by regurgitating them when attacked by an insectivorous insect.

A third class of allelochemical (chemical used in interspecific communication), synomones, benefit both the sender and receiver.

"Allomone was proposed by Brown and Eisner (Brown, 1968) to denote those substances which convey an advantage upon the emitter. Because Brown and Eisner did not specify whether or not the receiver would benefit, the original definition of allomone includes both substances that benefit the receiver and the emitter, and substances that only benefit the emitter. An example of the first relationship would be a mutualistic relationship, and the latter would be a repellent secretion."

== Examples ==
- Antibiotics

Disrupt growth and development and reduce longevity of adults e.g. toxins or digestibility reducing factors.

- Antixenotics

Disrupt normal host selection behaviour e.g. Repellents, suppressants, locomotory excitants.

=== Plants producing allomones ===
- Desmodium (tick-trefoils)

=== Insects producing allomones ===
- The larvae of the berothid lacewing Lomamyia latipennis feed on termites which they subdue with an aggressive allomone. The first instar approaches a termite and waves the tip of its abdomen near the termite's head. The termite becomes immobile after 1 to 3 minutes, and completely paralysed very soon after this, although it may live for up to 3 hours. The berothid then feeds on the paralysed prey. The third instar feeds in a similar manner and may kill up to six termites at a time. Contact between the termite and the berothid is not necessary for subduing, and other insects present are not affected by the allomone.
- Bark beetles communicate via pheromones to announce a new food resource (i.e. dead trees, roots, living trees, etc.) ultimately resulting in the accumulation of a large concentration of bark beetles. Select species of bark beetles have the capability to emit pheromones that can negatively affect the behavioral response of another competing species of bark beetles when both species are attempting to inhabit the loblolly pine tree. A certain molecular compound within the released pheromone of one species can interfere with a competing species' ability to respond its own species' pheromone in the environment. This interaction aides the emitter by decreasing its local bark beetle competition. A competitive interaction occurring between two species of bark beetles is seen when the pheromones of G. sulcates interferes with the behavioral feedback of G. retusus. The impact of interactions between competing species fighting for food and space within an environment is seen when observing the California I. pini. The I. pinihave two receptors in which one is used to receive the pheromone of their own species and the other receptor receives the pheromone of their competing species. The presence of these two receptors makes sure that pheromones from their own species, I. pini, are not being interrupted by their competing species, I. paraconfusus.
- Arthropods that travel alone, like beetles and cockroaches, have evolved to emit pheromones when in the presence of ants in which the emitted pheromone is identical to the ant's alarm pheromone. The alarm pheromone of the worker ants causes the ants to stop what they are doing and to return to their nest till the alarm pheromone ceases in their environment. This release of an ant alarm pheromone by an arthropod causes the ants to go into alarm and allows the arthropod to escape its predators before the ants are able to recruit more workers.

== See also ==
- Allelopathy
- Chemical mimicry
