= Raspberry ketone =

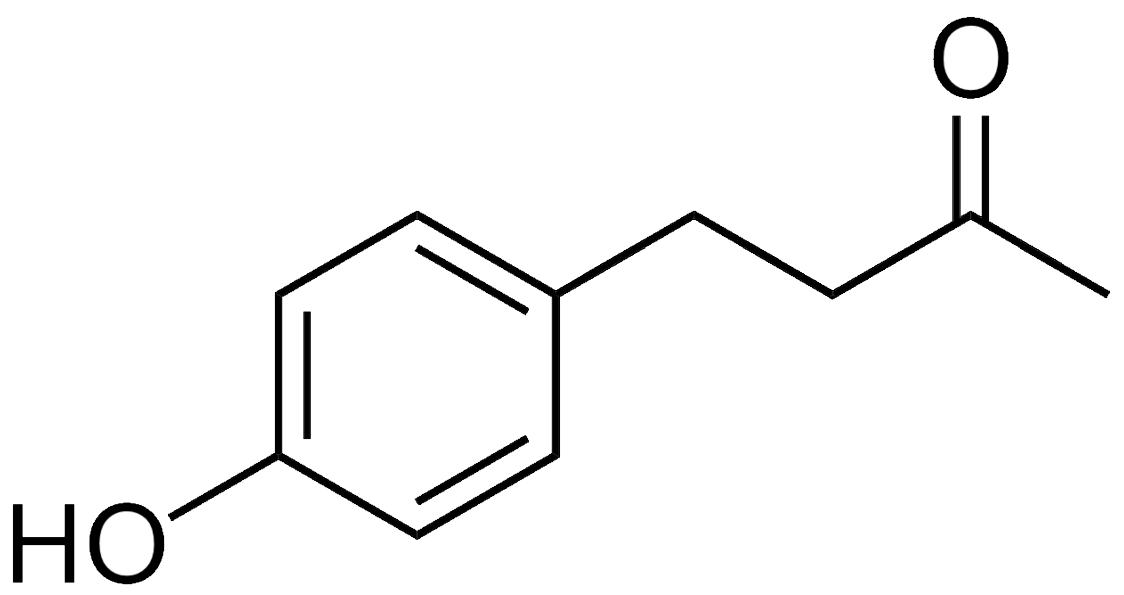

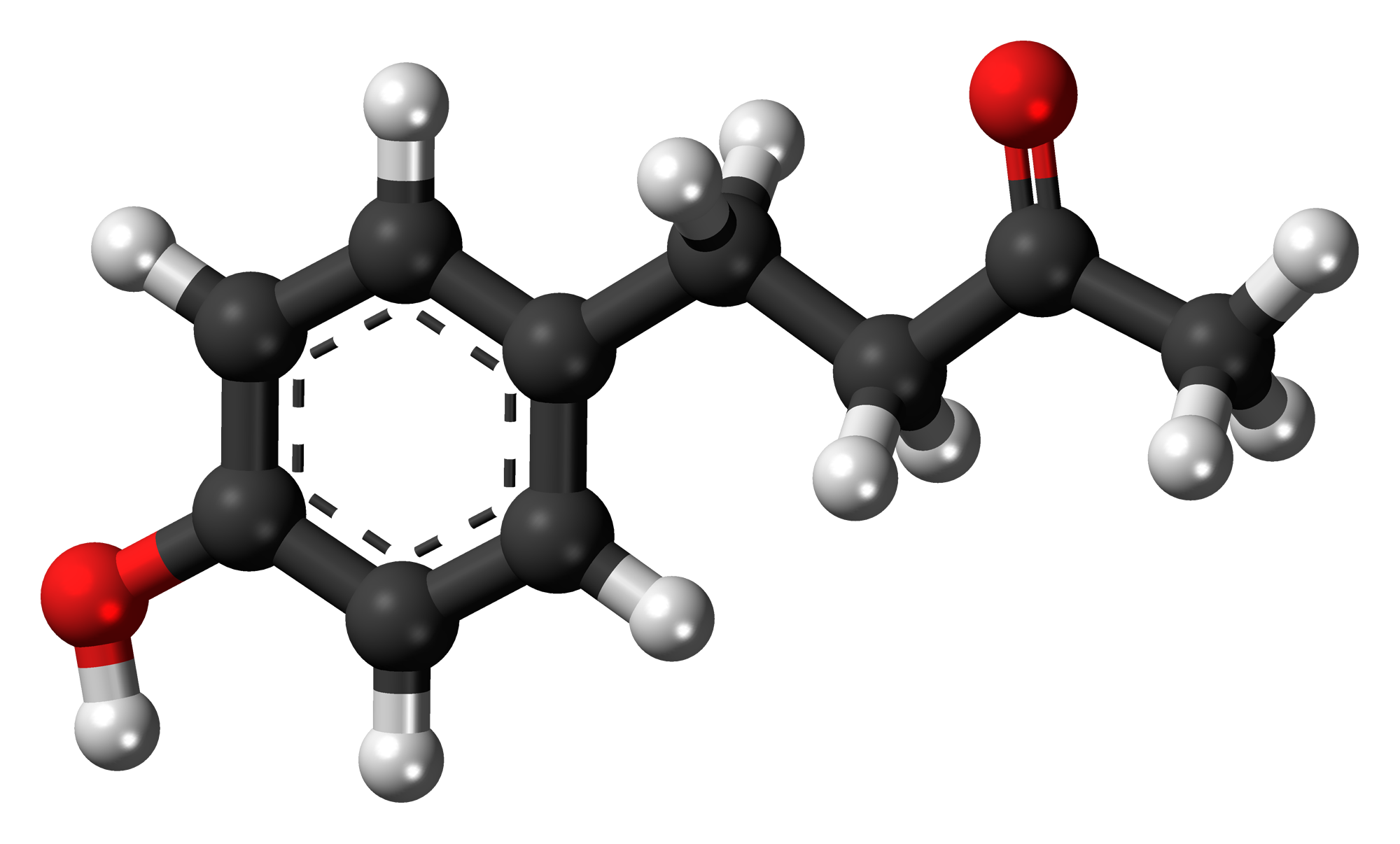

Names
- Preferred IUPAC name 4-(4-Hydroxyphenyl)butan-2-one
- Other names p-Hydroxybenzyl acetone; 4-(p-Hydroxyphenyl)-2-butanone; Frambinone; Oxyphenylon; Rheosmin; Rasketone

Identifiers
CAS Number	5471-51-2
3D model (JSmol)	Interactive image
Abbreviations	RK
ChEBI	CHEBI:68656
ChEMBL	ChEMBL105912
ChemSpider	20347
ECHA InfoCard	100.024.370
EC Number	226-806-4
PubChem CID	21648
UNII	7QY1MH15BG
CompTox Dashboard (EPA)	DTXSID5044495
- InChI: InChI=1S/C10H12O2/c1-8(11)2-3-9-4-6-10(12)7-5-9/h4-7,12H,2-3H2,1H3 Key: NJGBTKGETPDVIK-UHFFFAOYSA-N; InChI=1/C10H12O2/c1-8(11)2-3-9-4-6-10(12)7-5-9/h4-7,12H,2-3H2,1H3 Key: NJGBTKGETPDVIK-UHFFFAOYAT
- SMILES: O=C(CCc1ccc(O)cc1)C

Properties
Chemical formula	C_{10}H_{12}O_{2}
Molar mass	164.204 g·mol^{−1}
Appearance	White needles
Melting point	82 to 84 °C (180 to 183 °F; 355 to 357 K)
Boiling point	140 to 146 °C (284 to 295 °F; 413 to 419 K) at 0.5 mmHg

Hazards
- GHS labelling
Pictograms	(GHS07: Exclamation mark)
Signal word	Warning
Hazard statements	H302
Precautionary statements	P264, P270, P301+P312, P330, P501
- Except where otherwise noted, data are given for materials in their standard state (at 25 °C [77 °F], 100 kPa). verify (what is ?) Infobox references

Raspberry ketone is a naturally occurring phenolic compound that is the primary aroma compound of red raspberries.

== Occurrence ==
Raspberry ketone occurs in a variety of fruits, including raspberries, cranberries, and blackberries. It is released by orchid flowers, e.g. Dendrobium anosmum (syn D. superbum), and several Bulbophyllum species to attract raspberry ketone-responsive male Dacini fruit flies. It is biosynthesized from coumaroyl-CoA. It can be extracted from the fruit, yielding about 1–4 mg per kg of raspberries.

== Preparation ==
Since the natural abundance of raspberry ketone is low, it is prepared industrially by a variety of methods from chemical intermediates. One of the ways this can be done is through a Claisen–Schmidt condensation followed by catalytic hydrogenation. First, acetone is condensed with 4-hydroxybenzaldehyde to form an α,β-unsaturated ketone. Then the alkene part is reduced to the alkane. This two-step method produces raspberry ketone in 99% yield. There is a less expensive hydrogenation catalyst, nickel boride, which also demonstrates high selectivity towards hydrogenation of the double bond of enone.

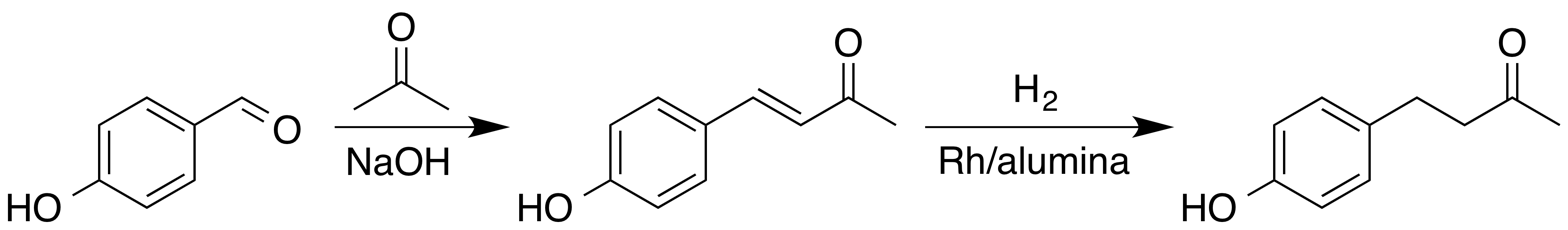

== Uses ==
Raspberry ketone is sometimes used in perfumery, in cosmetics, and as a food additive to impart a fruity odor. It is one of the most expensive natural flavor components used in the food industry. The natural compound can cost as much as $20,000 per kg.

== Marketing ==
Although products containing this compound are marketed for weight loss, there is no clinical evidence for this effect in humans. They are called "ketones" because of the ketone (acetone) group at their end, which is shared with ketone bodies.

== Safety ==
Little is known about the long-term safety of raspberry ketone supplements in humans. Toxicological models indicate potential for cardiotoxicity and effects on reproduction and fetal development. No international regulatory authority has approved raspberry ketone as a weight loss supplement or established whether it is safe to use.

In 1965, the US Food and Drug Administration classified raspberry ketone as generally recognized as safe (GRAS) for the small quantities used to flavor foods.

== See also ==
- Raspberry ellagitannin
- Zingerone
