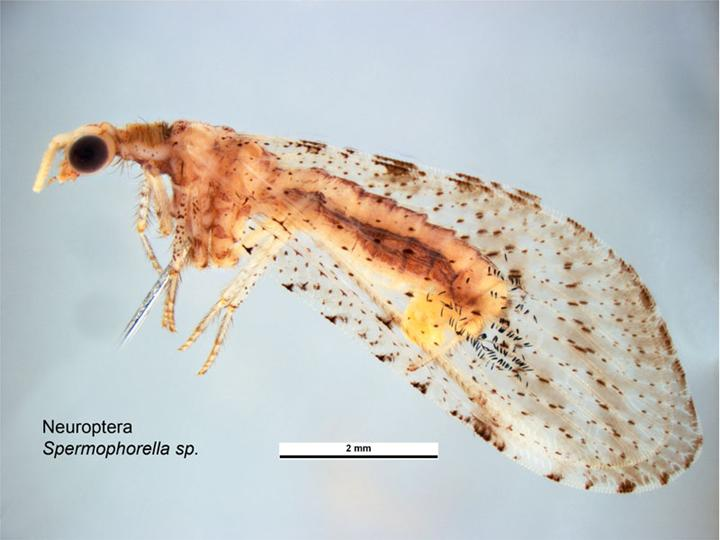
- Spermophorella sp.

Scientific classification
- Kingdom: Animalia
- Phylum: Arthropoda
- Clade: Pancrustacea
- Class: Insecta
- Order: Neuroptera
- Clade: Euneuroptera
- Superfamily: Mantispoidea
- Family: Berothidae; Handlirsch, 1906

Subfamilies
- See text

= Berothidae =

Berothidae Temporal range: Late Jurassic–Recent

Family of insects

The Berothidae are a family of winged insects of the order Neuroptera. They are known commonly as the beaded lacewings. The family was first named by Anton Handlirsch in 1906. The family consists of 24 genera and 110 living species distributed discontinuously worldwide, mostly in tropical and subtropical regions. Numerous extinct species have also been described. Their ecology is poorly known, but in the species where larval stages have been documented, the larvae are predators of termites.

== Systematics ==
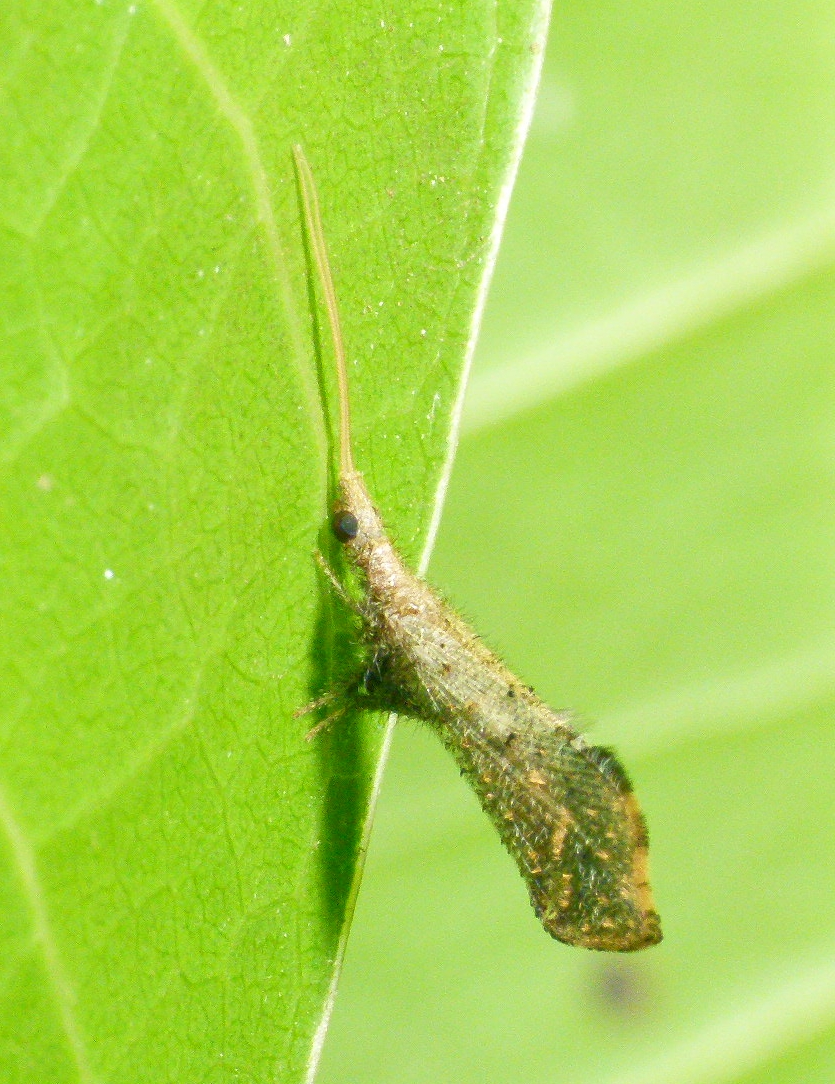
Typical posture in life

A considerable fossil diversity of beaded lacewings is known from the Late Jurassic onwards, containing numerous genera which are likewise basal or incertae sedis.

Subfamily Berothimerobiinae

- Berothimerobius Monserrat & Deretsky, 1999

Subfamily Berothinae

- Asadeteva Aspöck & Aspöck, 1981
- Barrowiella Smithers, 1984
- Berlekrumyia Aspöck & Aspöck, 1988
- Berotha Walker, 1860
- †Elektroberotha Makarkin & Ohl 2015 Eocene (Lutetian); Baltic amber, northern Europe
- Isoscelipteron Costa, 1863
- Lekrugeria Navás, 1929
- Lomamyia Banks, 1904
- Nodalla Navás, 1926
- Podallea Navás, 1936
- Quasispermophorella Aspöck & Aspöck, 1986
- Spermophorella Tillyard, 1916
- Spiroberotha Adams, 1990
- Stenobiella Tillyard, 1916
- †Xenoberotha Makarkin 2017 Green River Formation, United States, Eocene

Subfamily Cyrenoberothinae

- †Aggregataberotha Wang et al., 2023 (Cenomanian, Burmese amber, Myanmar)
- †Araripeberotha Martins-Neto & Vulcano 1990 Cretaceous (Aptian); Crato Formation, Brazil
- †Caririberotha Martins-Neto & Vulcano 1990 Cretaceous (Aptian); Crato Formation, Brazil
- Cyrenoberotha MacLeod & Adams, 1968
- Manselliberotha Aspöck & Aspöck, 1988
- †Microberotha Archibald & Makarkin 2004 (Eocene (Ypresian), Hat Creek amber, Canada)
- Ormiscocerus Blanchard, 1851
- †Protoberotha Huang et al., 2019 (Cenomanian, Burmese amber, Myanmar)
- †Sibelliberotha Azar & Nel 2013 (Barremian, Lebanese amber)
- Speleoberotha Machado et al., 2022

Subfamily †Mesithoninae Panfilov, 1980

- †Mesithone Panfilov 1980 Callovian/Oxfordian; Karabastau Formation, Kazakhstan; Aptian; Zaza Formation, Turga Formation, Russia
- †Oloberotha Ren & Guo 1996 Aptian; Yixian Formation, China

Subfamily Nosybinae

- †Banoberotha Whalley 1980 Cretaceous (Barremian); Lebanese amber, Lebanon
- Naizema Navás, 1919
- Nosybus Navás, 1910
- Tanzanberotha Aspöck & Hynd, 1995

Subfamily Nyrminae

- Nyrma Navás, 1933

Subfamily Protobiellinae

- Austroberothella Aspöck & Aspöck, 1985
- Protobiella Tillyard, 1923

Subfamily Trichomatinae

- Trichoberotha Handschin, 1935
- Trichoma Tillyard, 1916

Subfamily Incertae sedis

- †Ansoberotha Yang et al., 2019 Cenomanian; Burmese amber, Myanmar
- †Berothone Khramov 2015 Callovian/Oxfordian; Karabastau Formation, Kazakhstan
- †Cantabroberotha Pérez-de la Fuente et al., 2021 Cretaceous (Albian); Spanish amber, Spain
- †Cornoberotha Yang et al., 2019 Cenomanian; Burmese amber, Myanmar
- †Dasyberotha Engel & Grimaldi 2008 Cenomanian; Burmese amber, Myanmar
- †Epimesoberotha Jepson et al., 2012 Cretaceous (Berriasian); Lulworth Formation, United Kingdom
- †Ethiroberotha Engel & Grimaldi 2008 Cenomanian; Burmese amber, Myanmar
- †Haploberotha Engel & Grimaldi 2008 Cenomanian; Burmese amber, Myanmar
- †Iceloberotha Engel & Grimaldi 2008 Cenomanian; Burmese amber, Myanmar
- †Jersiberotha Grimaldi 2000 Cenomanian; Burmese amber, Myanmar; Cretaceous (Turonian); New Jersey amber, United States
- †Krokhathone Khramov 2015 Jurassic (Callovian/Oxfordian); Karabastau Formation, Kazakhstan
- †Maculaberotha Yuan et al., 2016 Cenomanian; Burmese amber, Myanmar
- †Magniberotha Yuan et al., 2016 Cenomanian; Burmese amber, Myanmar
- †Nascimberotha Grimaldi 2000 Turonian; New Jersey amber, United States
- †Plesiorobius Klimaszewski & Kevan, 1986 Cretaceous (Campanian); Canadian amber, Canada; Campanian; Taymyr amber, Russia; Cenomanian, unknown formation, Russia
- †Proberotha Krüger, 1923 Lutetian, Baltic Amber, northern Europe
- †Osmyloberotha Khramov 2021 Cenomanian; Burmese amber, Myanmar
- †Sinosmylites Hong 1983 Daohugou, Haifanggou Formation, China, Callovian, Karabastau Formation, Kazakhstan, Callovian/Oxfordian, Ulaan-Ereg Formation, Mongolia, Late Jurassic (Tithonian)
- †Systenoberotha Engel & Grimaldi 2008 Cenomanian; Burmese amber, Myanmar
- †Telistoberotha Engel & Grimaldi 2008 Cenomanian; Burmese amber, Myanmar
- †Xiaoberotha Shi et al., 2019 Cenomanian; Burmese amber, Myanmar

=== Formerly included taxa ===
Subfamily Paraberothinae (now included in Rhachiberothidae)

- †Acanthoberotha Nakamine et al., 2020 Cenomanian; Burmese amber, Myanmar
- †Alboberotha Nel et al., 2005 Cretaceous (Albian); Charentense amber, France
- †Astioberotha Nakamine et al., 2020 Cenomanian; Burmese amber, Myanmar
- †Chimerhachiberotha Nel et al., 2005 Barremian; Lebanese amber, Lebanon
- †Creagroparaberotha Makarkin, 2015 Cenomanian; Burmese amber, Myanmar
- †EorhachiberothaEngel, 2004 Cenomanian; Burmese amber, Myanmar
- †Kujiberotha Nakamine & Yamamoto, 2018 Cretaceous (Santonian); Kuji amber, Japan
- †Micromantispa Shi et al., 2015 Cenomanian; Burmese amber, Myanmar
- †Paraberotha Whalley, 1980 Barremian; Lebanese amber, Lebanon
- †Pseudosisyra Makarkin, 1999 Aptian; Zaza Formation, Russia
- †Raptorapax Petrulevicius et al., 2010 Barremian; Lebanese amber, Lebanon
- †Retinoberotha Schlüter, 1978 Cenomanian; Bezonnais amber, France,
- †Rhachibermissa Grimaldi, 2000 Turonian; New Jersey amber, United States
- †Scoloberotha Engel & Grimaldi, 2008 Cenomanian; Burmese amber, Myanmar
- †Spinoberotha Nel et al., 2005 Cenomanian; Burmese amber, Myanmar
- †Stygioberotha Nakamine et al, 2020 Cenomanian; Burmese amber, Myanmar
- †Uranoberotha Nakamine et al, 2020 Cenomanian; Burmese amber, Myanmar
