= Zingerone =

- Zingerone

Names
- Preferred IUPAC name 4-(4-Hydroxy-3-methoxyphenyl)butan-2-one

Identifiers
CAS Number	122-48-5
3D model (JSmol)	Interactive image
ChEBI	CHEBI:68657
ChEMBL	ChEMBL25894
ChemSpider	28952
ECHA InfoCard	100.004.136
PubChem CID	31211
UNII	4MMW850892
CompTox Dashboard (EPA)	DTXSID8047420
- InChI: InChI=1S/C11H14O3/c1-8(12)3-4-9-5-6-10(13)11(7-9)14-2/h5-7,13H,3-4H2,1-2H3 Key: OJYLAHXKWMRDGS-UHFFFAOYSA-N; InChI=1/C11H14O3/c1-8(12)3-4-9-5-6-10(13)11(7-9)14-2/h5-7,13H,3-4H2,1-2H3 Key: OJYLAHXKWMRDGS-UHFFFAOYAN
- SMILES: O=C(C)CCc1cc(OC)c(O)cc1

Properties
Chemical formula	C_{11}H_{14}O_{3}
Molar mass	194.22 g/mol
Melting point	40 to 41 °C (104 to 106 °F; 313 to 314 K)
Boiling point	187 to 188 °C (369 to 370 °F; 460 to 461 K) at 14 mmHg
Solubility in water	Insoluble
Solubility	Miscible in ether
- Except where otherwise noted, data are given for materials in their standard state (at 25 °C [77 °F], 100 kPa). verify (what is ?) Infobox references

Zingerone, also called vanillylacetone, is a major flavor component of ginger, providing the sweet flavor of cooked ginger. Zingerone is a crystalline solid that is sparingly soluble in water and soluble in ether.

Zingerone is similar in chemical structure to other flavor chemicals such as vanillin and eugenol. It is used as a flavor additive in spice oils and in perfumery to introduce spicy aromas.

Fresh ginger does not contain zingerone, but it is produced by cooking or drying of the ginger root, which causes a reverse aldol reaction on gingerol.

== Production ==
=== History ===
Zingerone was first isolated from the ginger root in 1917 by Hiroshi Nomura, a chemistry professor at Tokyo Imperial University. Nomura named the compound and determined its empirical formula as part of his studies at the laboratory of the Agricultural College. He initially identified it as the chemical component contributing pungency to ginger, something further work has disproven.

=== Current methods ===
Nomura developed and later patented a method for the synthesis of zingerone, in which vanillin and acetone react by a Claisen–Schmidt condensation to form dehydrozingerone in about 95% yield. This reaction is followed by catalytic hydrogenation of the intermediate compound in order to form zingerone, again in high yield.

== Biological effects ==
Ginger compounds have been shown to be active against enterotoxigenic Escherichia coli heat-labile enterotoxin-induced diarrhea. This type of diarrhea is the leading cause of infant death in developing countries. Zingerone is likely the active constituent responsible for the antidiarrheal efficacy of ginger.

Zingerone is recognized as being a particularly efficient free radical scavenger. It is able to scavenge and degrade free radicals and reactive oxygen species in the body, and inhibits enzymes involved in the generation of these reactive oxygen species.

It is used by some flowers to attract pollinating fruit flies by mimicking the sex pheromone of the fly.

== See also ==
- Raspberry ketone
