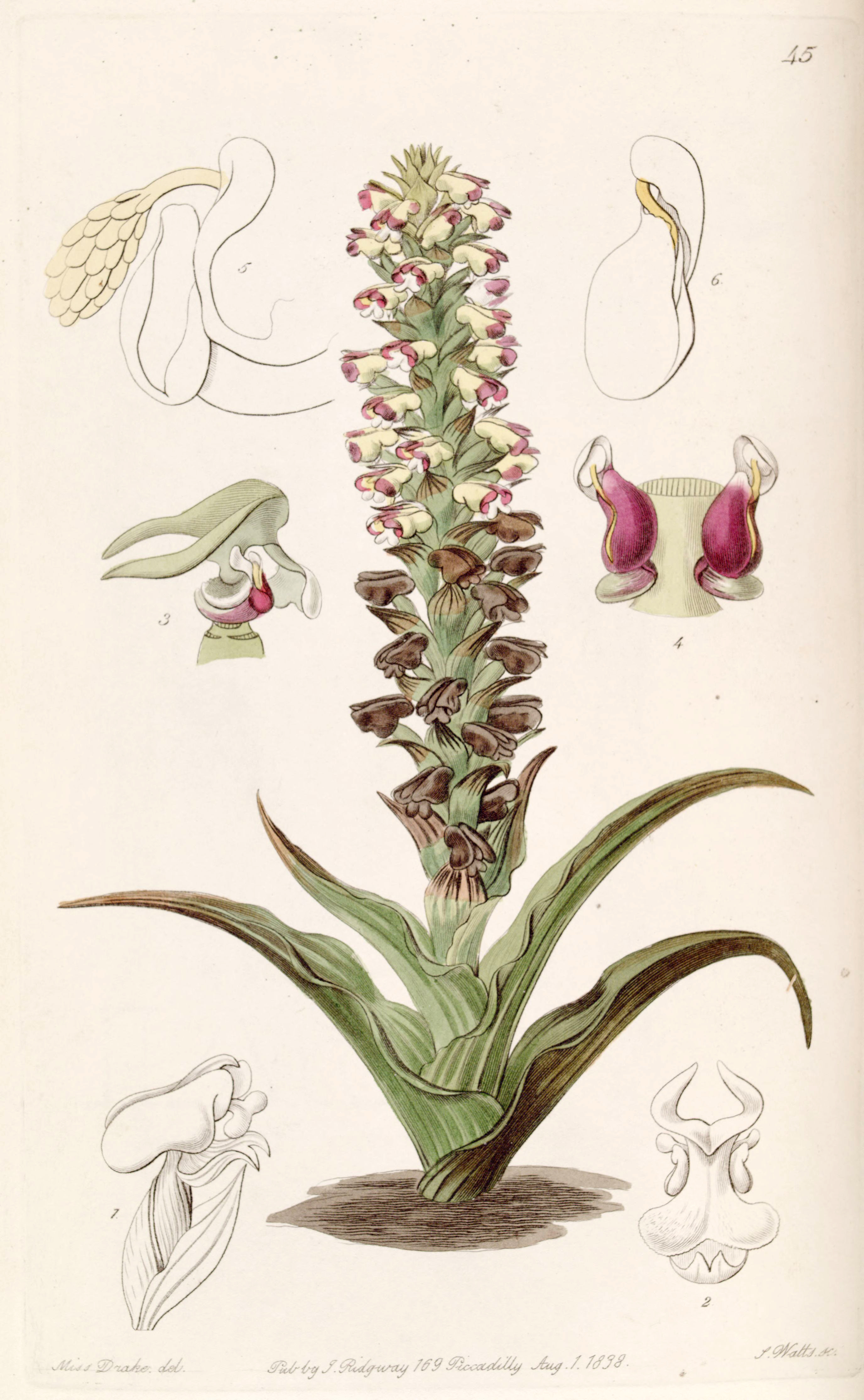
- Corycium orobanchoides 1838 illustration from Edwards's Botanical Register

Scientific classification
- Kingdom: Plantae
- Clade: Tracheophytes
- Clade: Angiosperms
- Clade: Monocots
- Order: Asparagales
- Family: Orchidaceae
- Subfamily: Orchidoideae
- Tribe: Orchideae
- Subtribe: Coryciinae
- Genus: Corycium; Sw.

= Corycium =

Monkshood orchids

Genus of flowering plants in the orchid family

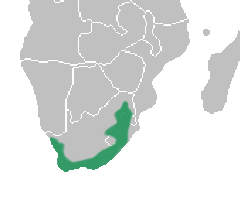
Corycium range map

Corycium is a genus of terrestrial orchids comprising some 14 species in Eastern and Southern Africa including 10 species native to the fynbos. In South Africa they are called monkshood orchids.

Their resting stage is a tuber and when growing they have many leaves scattered along the stem but concentrated near the base. The dense spikes of flowers are not particularly striking and are often brown, green or purple. The uppermost 3 tepals are connivent into a hood whilst the lateral sepals are almost united. The lip is joined to the column bearing an appendage that covers the anthers

== Species ==
- Corycium alticola Parkman & Schelpe - South Africa, Lesotho
- Corycium bicolorum (Thunb.) Sw. - South Africa
- Corycium bifidum Sond. - South Africa
- Corycium carnosum (Lindl.) Rolfe in W.H.Harvey - South Africa
- Corycium crispum (Thunb.) Sw. - South Africa
- Corycium deflexum (Bolus) Rolfe in W.H.Harvey - South Africa
- Corycium dracomontanum Parkman & Schelpe - South Africa, Lesotho, Swaziland, Malawi
- Corycium excisum Lindl. - South Africa
- Corycium flanaganii (Bolus) Kurzweil & H.P.Linder - South Africa, Lesotho
- Corycium ingeanum E.G.H.Oliv. - South Africa
- Corycium microglossum Lindl. - South Africa
- Corycium nigrescens Sond. - South Africa, Lesotho, Swaziland, Tanzania
- Corycium orobanchoides (L.f.) Sw. - South Africa
- Corycium tricuspidatum Bolus - South Africa
