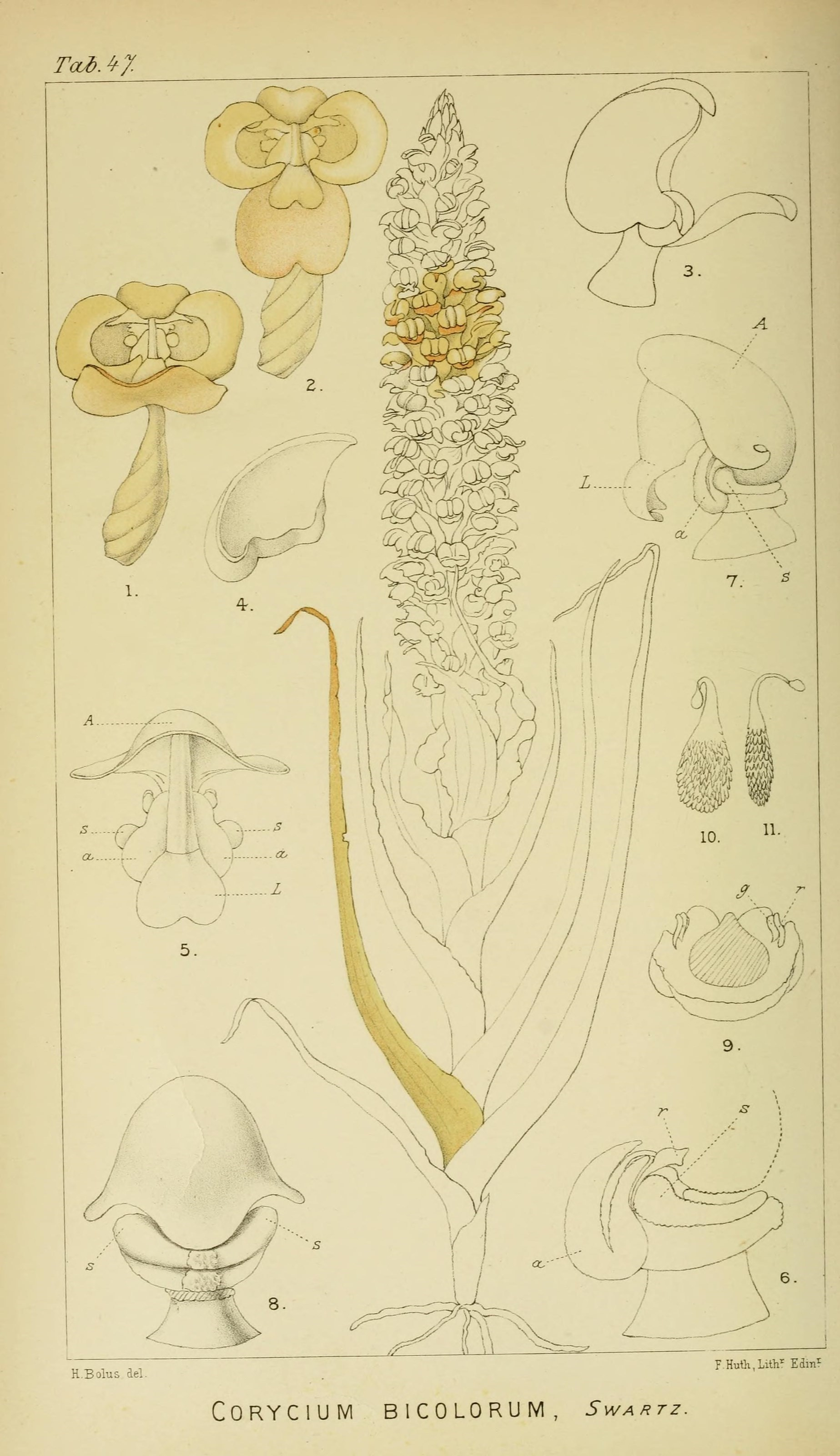

Scientific classification
- Kingdom: Plantae
- Clade: Tracheophytes
- Clade: Angiosperms
- Clade: Monocots
- Order: Asparagales
- Family: Orchidaceae
- Subfamily: Orchidoideae
- Genus: Corycium
- Species: C. bicolorum

Binomial name
- Corycium bicolorum (Thunb.) Sw.

= Corycium bicolorum =

Species of orchid

Corycium bicolorum is a species of orchid native to South Africa.
