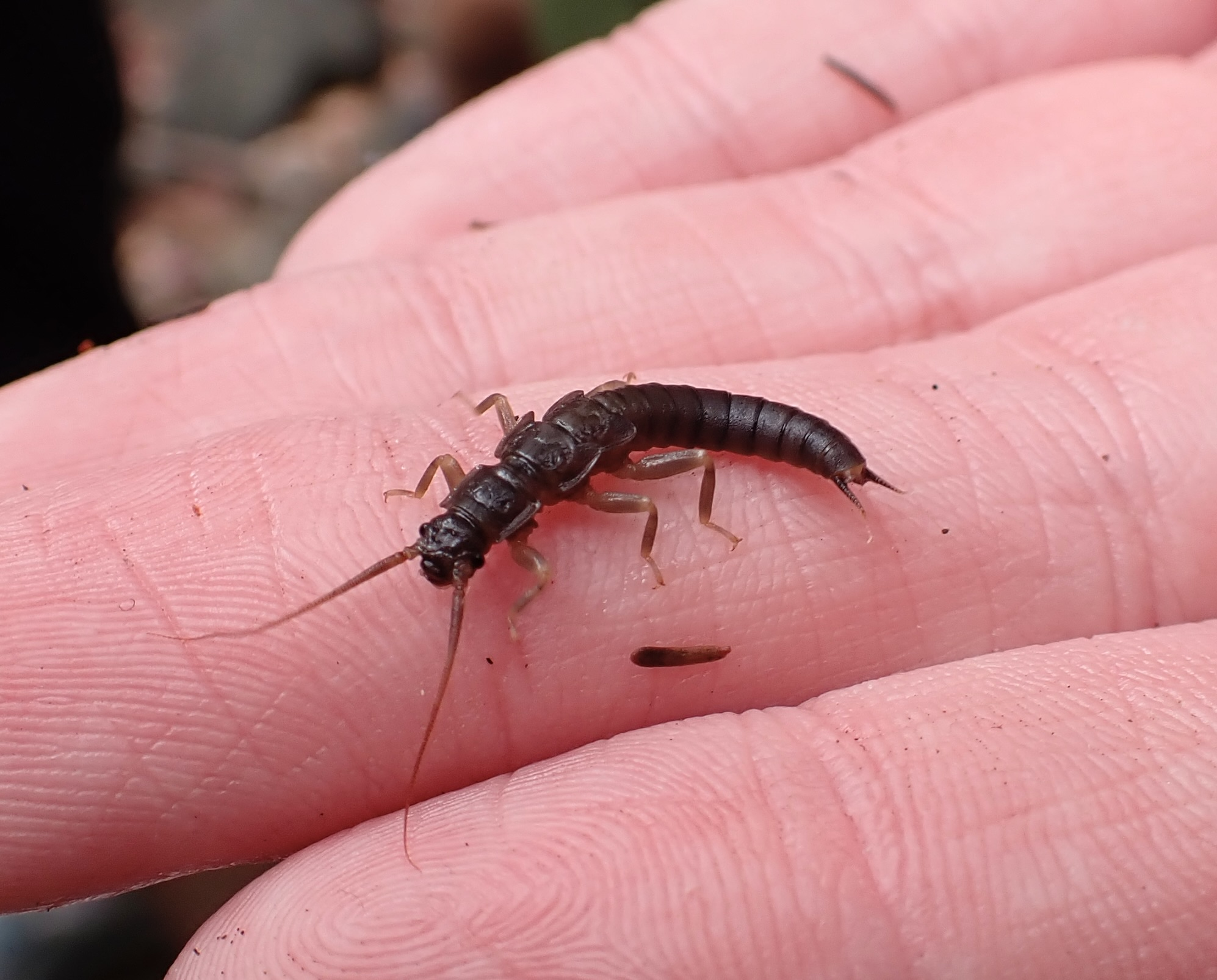
- Nymph at Humphries Rivulet, Hobart

Scientific classification
- Kingdom: Animalia
- Phylum: Arthropoda
- Class: Insecta
- Order: Plecoptera
- Family: Austroperlidae
- Genus: Tasmanoperla
- Species: T. larvalis

Binomial name
- Tasmanoperla larvalis (Illies, 1969)

= Tasmanoperla larvalis =

Species of stonefly

Tasmanoperla larvalis is a species of stonefly belonging to the family Austroperlidae. This species is endemic to Tasmania, Australia, and is one of only two species in the genus Tasmanoperla. The species was first described by Joachim Illies in 1969.

== Phylogeny ==
Tasmanoperla larvalis belongs to the family Austroperlidae, a group of stoneflies endemic to the Southern Hemisphere. Within this family, Tasmanoperla shares close evolutionary ties with genera Austroheptura, Austroperla, and Austropentura. Austroperlidae belongs to the suborder Antarctoperlaria, a group characterised by their ancient Gondwanaland origins and adaptions to the cold.

== Life cycle and characteristics ==
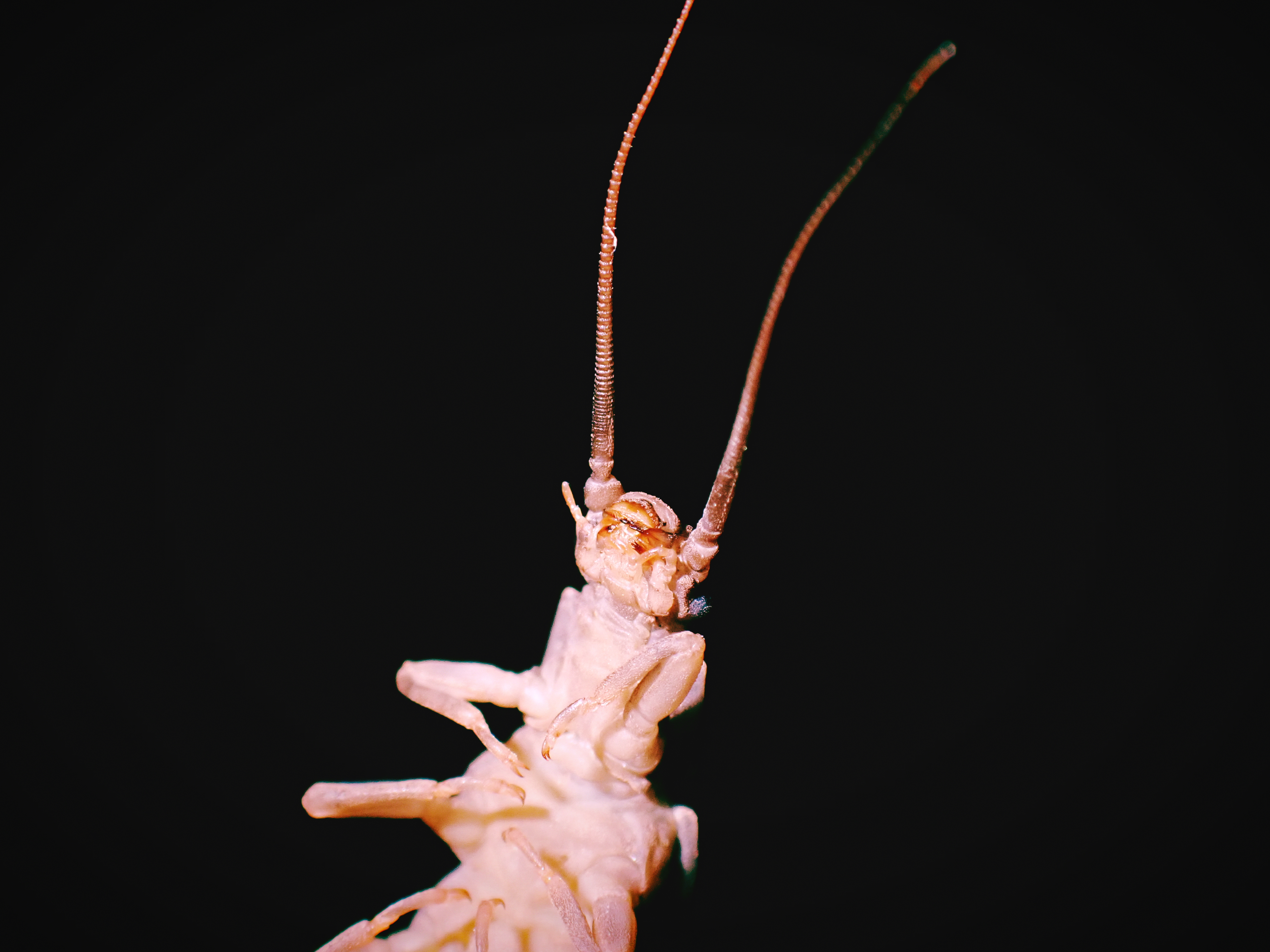
Nymph head

As a nymph, T. larvalis is primarily a detritivore, feeding on detritus, rotting wood, algae and moss. They inhabit the benthic zone of still and moving freshwater environments - such as stony lakeshores, logs and rocks under stone, gravel with leaf packs or other stony substrata. Their presence can be used as an indicator of good water quality, as they are sensitive to pollution and require high levels of dissolved oxygen, which they absorb through their five anal gills. They possess elongated, paired cerci extending from their abdomen, aiding in sensory perception. Robust legs, tipped with two claws, facilitating movement across stony substrates. Distinctive features include the absence of a terminal abdominal spine and fringed bristles on their cerci, differentiating them from closely related species Tasmanoperla thalia.

After three-four weeks, they go through series of moults to mature as an adult.

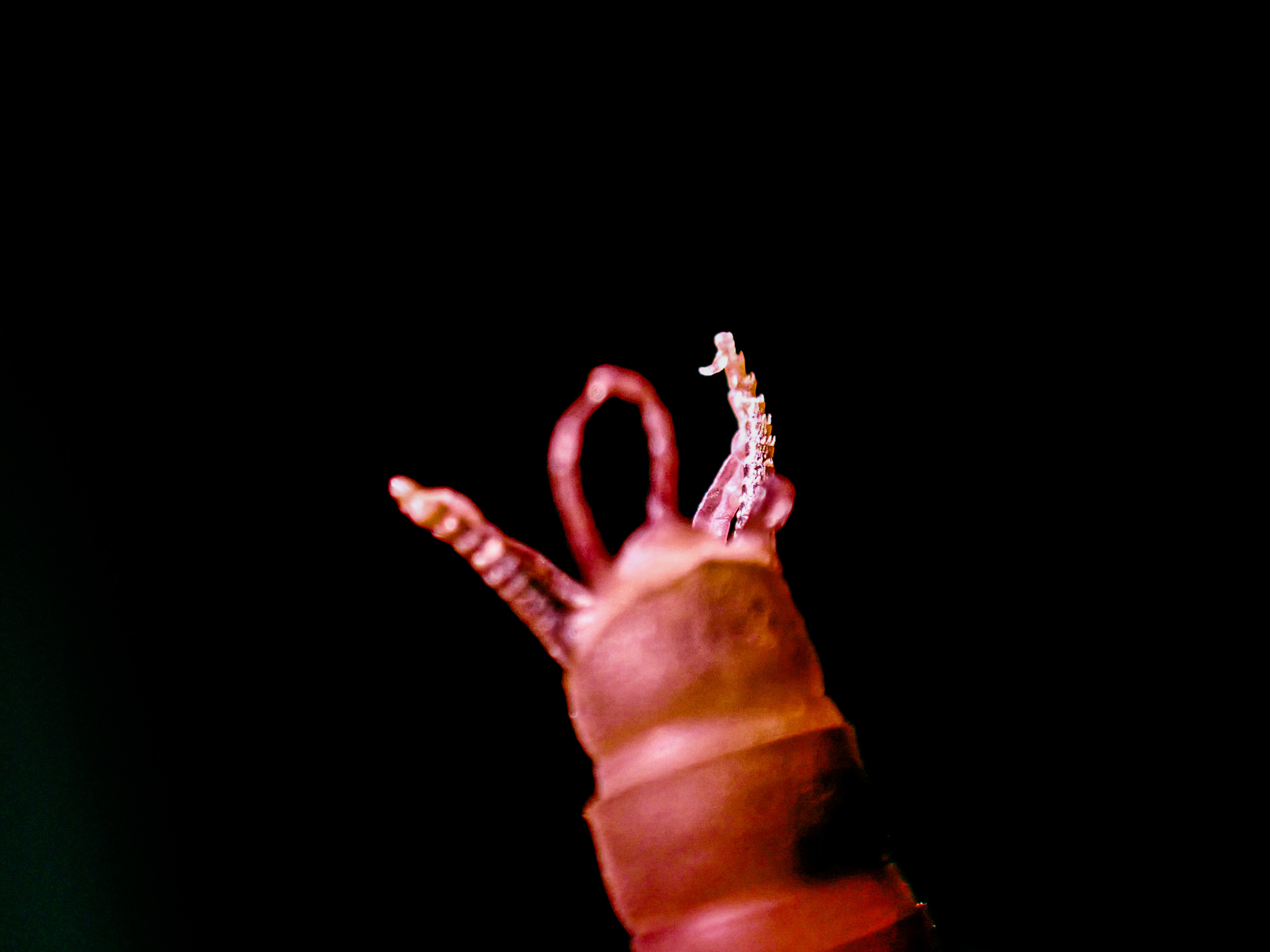
Nymph abdomen

Adult Austroperlidae stoneflies, including T. larvalis, possess elongated, flattened bodies with distinct head, thorax, and abdomen segments. They feature sensory antennae and cerci, and a robust, dark, heavily sclerotised exoskeleton. Adults typically range from 20 to 50mm in wingspan.

They are usually brown or yellow in colouration, with dark brown spots on the forewings that serve as camouflage within their habitat. They may retain short gill remnants from their larval stage, have ten abdominal tergeum and two long cerci. A key characteristic is the presence of two apical spurs on their tibiae, aiding in locomotion and mating.
