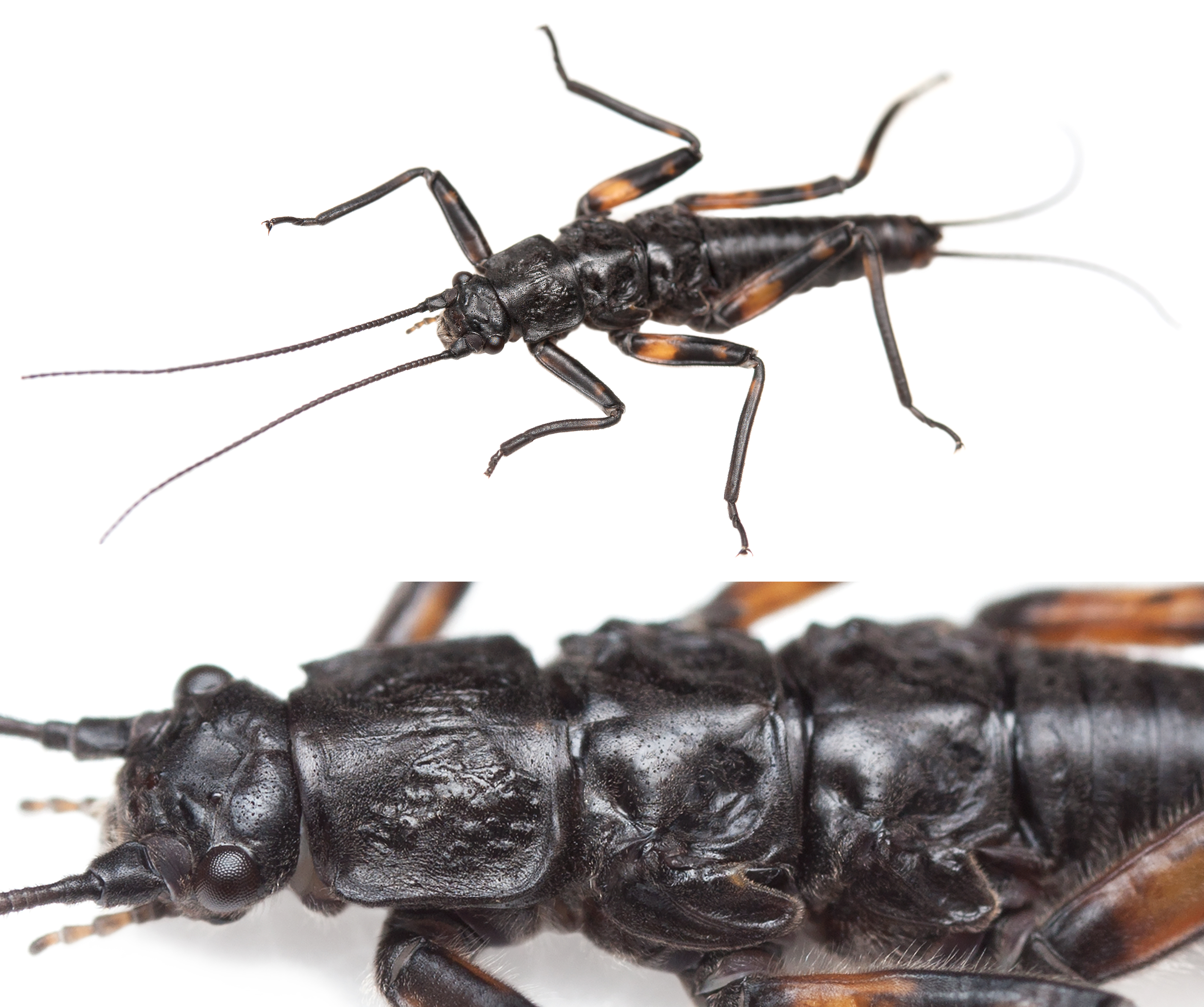

Scientific classification
- Domain: Eukaryota
- Kingdom: Animalia
- Phylum: Arthropoda
- Class: Insecta
- Order: Plecoptera
- Family: Gripopterygidae
- Genus: Zelandoperla
- Species: Z. maungatuaensis

Binomial name
- Zelandoperla maungatuaensis Foster in Foster, McCulloch & Waters, 2019

= Zelandoperla maungatuaensis =

Species of stonefly

Zelandoperla maungatuaensis, commonly known as the Maungatua stonefly, is a species of flightless stonefly so far known only from a single mountainside in Otago, New Zealand.

== History ==
The species was first discovered in 2017 by Professor Jon Waters, below the summit of Mt Maungatua, a mountain which overlooks Dunedin Airport. Researchers from the University of Otago returned to collect more, but only found nymphs, from which they were able to rear a single male to adulthood in the laboratory. The species was formally described by PhD student Brodie Foster in 2019 following DNA analysis.

== Description ==
Adult males of the species are 2 cm in length with a dark brown to black body. Legs are striped with a yellow to light brown colour. Its wings are reduced and dark brown in colour with a small yellow spot. Nymphs at the final instar stage are between 13.2 and 17.6 mm in length. They are thick-set with a finely serrated notum. No adult females of the species have yet been observed.

== Distribution ==
The Maungatua stonefly has only been found in subalpine streams along the eastern side of the Maungatua Range near Dunedin in Otago. Its ancestors are thought to have been blown into the area around 2 million years ago, and the species since lost its wings in response to the cold and windy environment.
