= Melanosis =

Dark coloration of tissue due to excess melanin

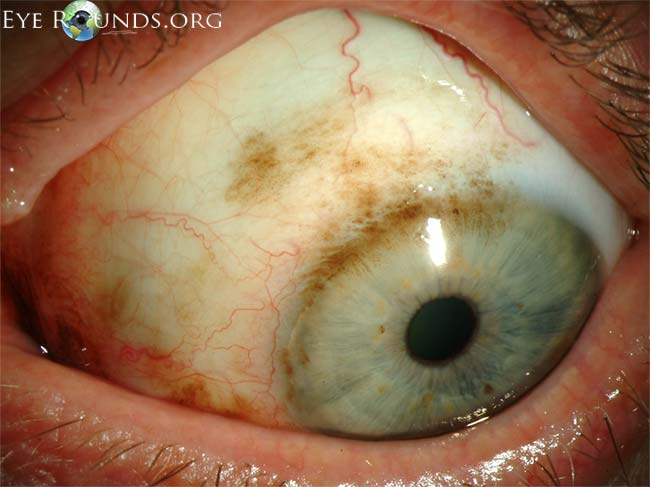
- A light brown, patchy appearance of primary acquired melanosis (PAM).
- Specialty: Dermatology

Melanosis is a form of hyperpigmentation associated with increased melanin.

It can also refer to:

- Melanism
- Ocular melanosis
- Smoker's melanosis
- Oral melanosis
- Riehl melanosis

== See also ==
- List of cutaneous conditions
