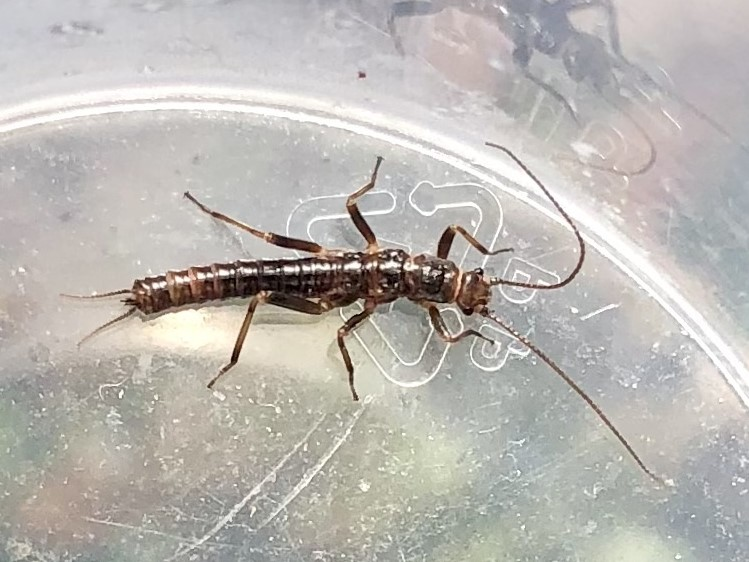

Conservation status
- Critically Endangered (IUCN 3.1)

Scientific classification
- Kingdom: Animalia
- Phylum: Arthropoda
- Class: Insecta
- Order: Plecoptera
- Family: Gripopterygidae
- Genus: Riekoperla
- Species: R. darlingtoni

Binomial name
- Riekoperla darlingtoni (Illies, 1968)

= Riekoperla darlingtoni =

Species of stonefly

Riekoperla darlingtoni, the Mount Donna Buang wingless stonefly, is a species of stonefly in the family Gripopterygidae that is endemic to Australia.

== Distribution ==
Riekoperla darlingtoni is found on Mount Donna Buang, a mountain peak in the Victorian Central Highlands which lies in one of the oldest and highest areas of dissected Palaeozoic rocks (formed approximately 500 million years ago) in the vicinity. The area is also popular tourist attraction throughout the year and the summit is a Scenic Reserve.

== Habitat ==
The area providing habitat for Riekoperla darlingtoni supports tall sclerophyll forest dominated by alpine ash (Eucalyptus delegatensis) with myrtle beech (Nothofagus cunninghamii) as a dominant understory tree species. The surrounding forest is dominated by mountain ash (Eucalyptus regnans). The stonefly apparently occurs only in the area within 1 kilometre (0.62 mi) of the summit of Mount Donna Buang, particularly on the southern slopes, and is restricted to the small temporary streams that flow through forest dominated by alpine ash.

The adult stonefly lives within rolled pieces of alpine ash bark suspended in low vegetation along natural drainage courses and in the vicinity of streams. The aquatic nymphs live under stones and in silty gravel in the drainage lines. Of particular scientific interest is the species' ability to survive the annual drying of its habitat, both in the egg stage and by burrowing down to a damper level, and also its seasonal flexibility in growth and emergence times, which enhances survival during the extremes of climate experienced on mountain tops.

The species has not been discovered in other similar areas despite deliberate searches.

== Relatives ==
The small brown, wingless stonefly is one of the only two wingless stoneflies in Australia, and the species was first collected by Darlington in 1931 from the Mount Donna Buang area. A distinguishing feature of the species is its long antennae, up to 100% of its body length.

== Threats ==
The Mount Donna Buang Wingless Stonefly has a very small home range, thought to be only 2–4 km. This area is protected within the Yarra Ranges National Park, but threats still remain. Fuel or herbicide spillages, changes in hydrology, and a proposed Mountain Bike Track called the Warburton Mountain Bike Destination allegedly threaten Mount Donna Buang Stonefly. The Mount Donna Buang Stonefly has recently been reassessed as Critically Endangered under Victorian State legislation, the Flora and Fauna Guarantee Act 1988.
