= Melanism =

Congenital high level of melanin in an organism resulting in dark pigment

Melanism is a congenital high level of melanin in an organism resulting in dark pigmentation. In contrast with albinism, which is generally caused by a mutation which is harmful to overall survival, melanistic morphs coexist stably with others in many species, such as squirrels and leopards.

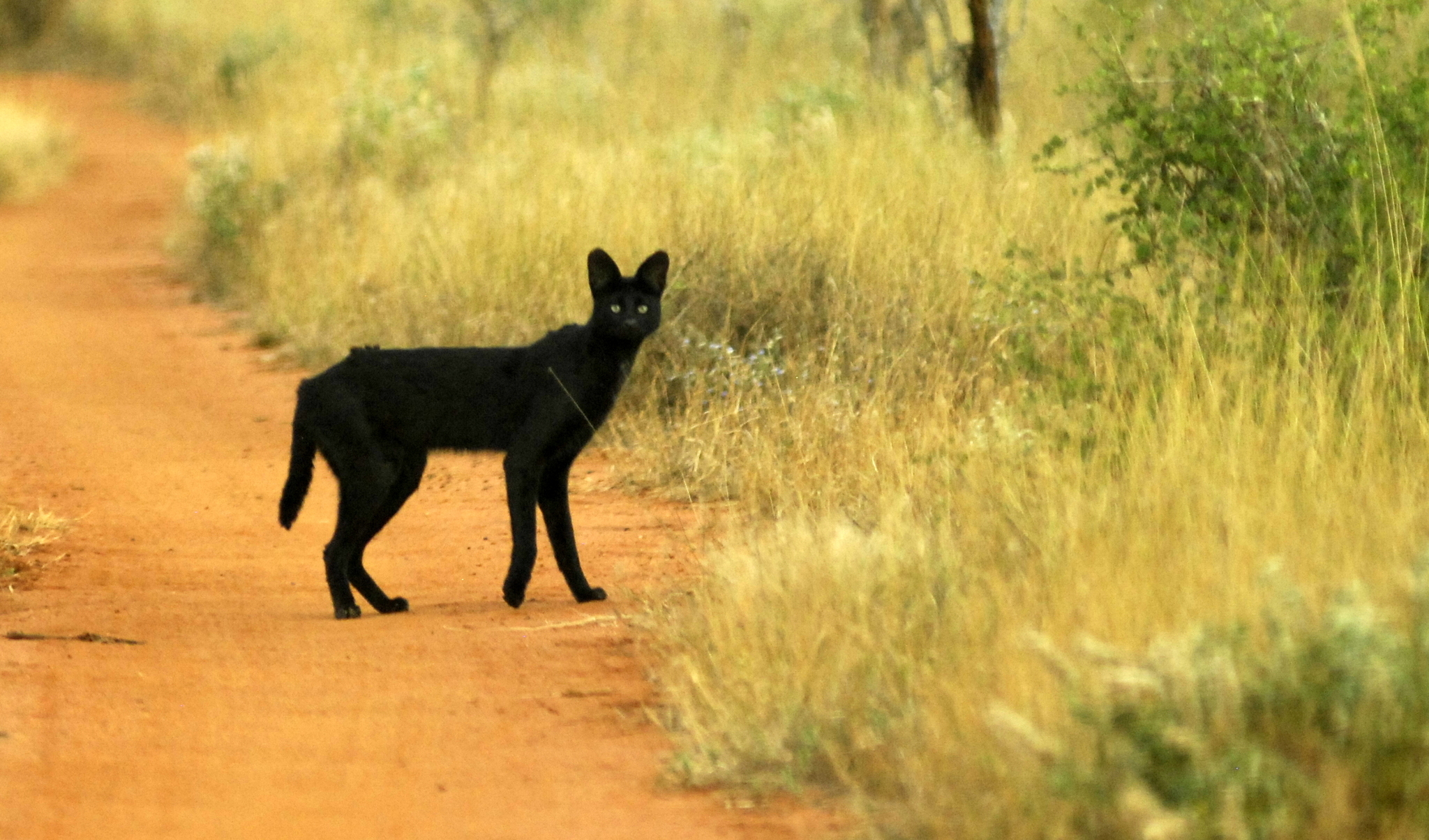
Black serval (Leptailurus serval)

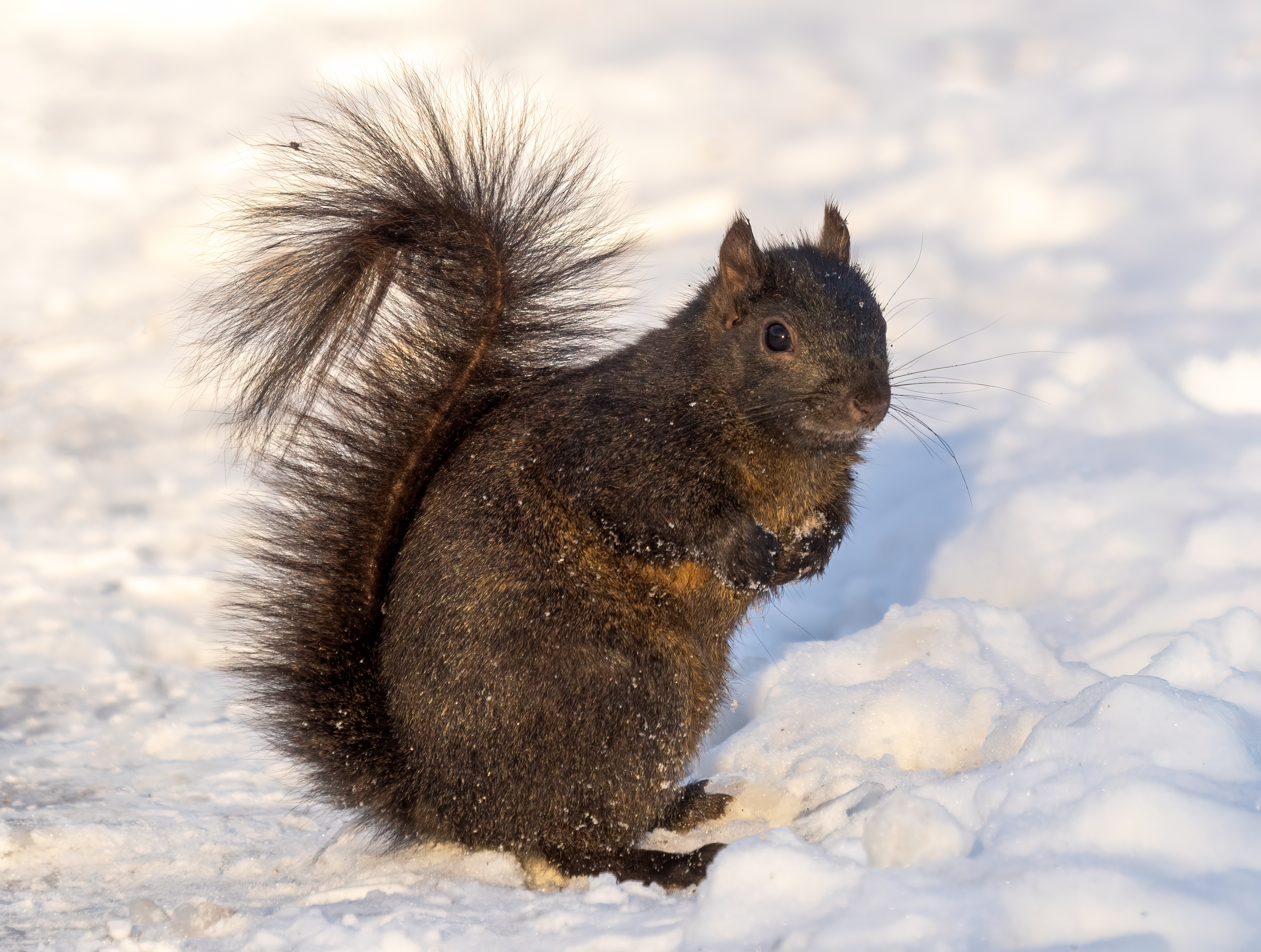
Black eastern grey squirrel (Sciurus carolinensis)

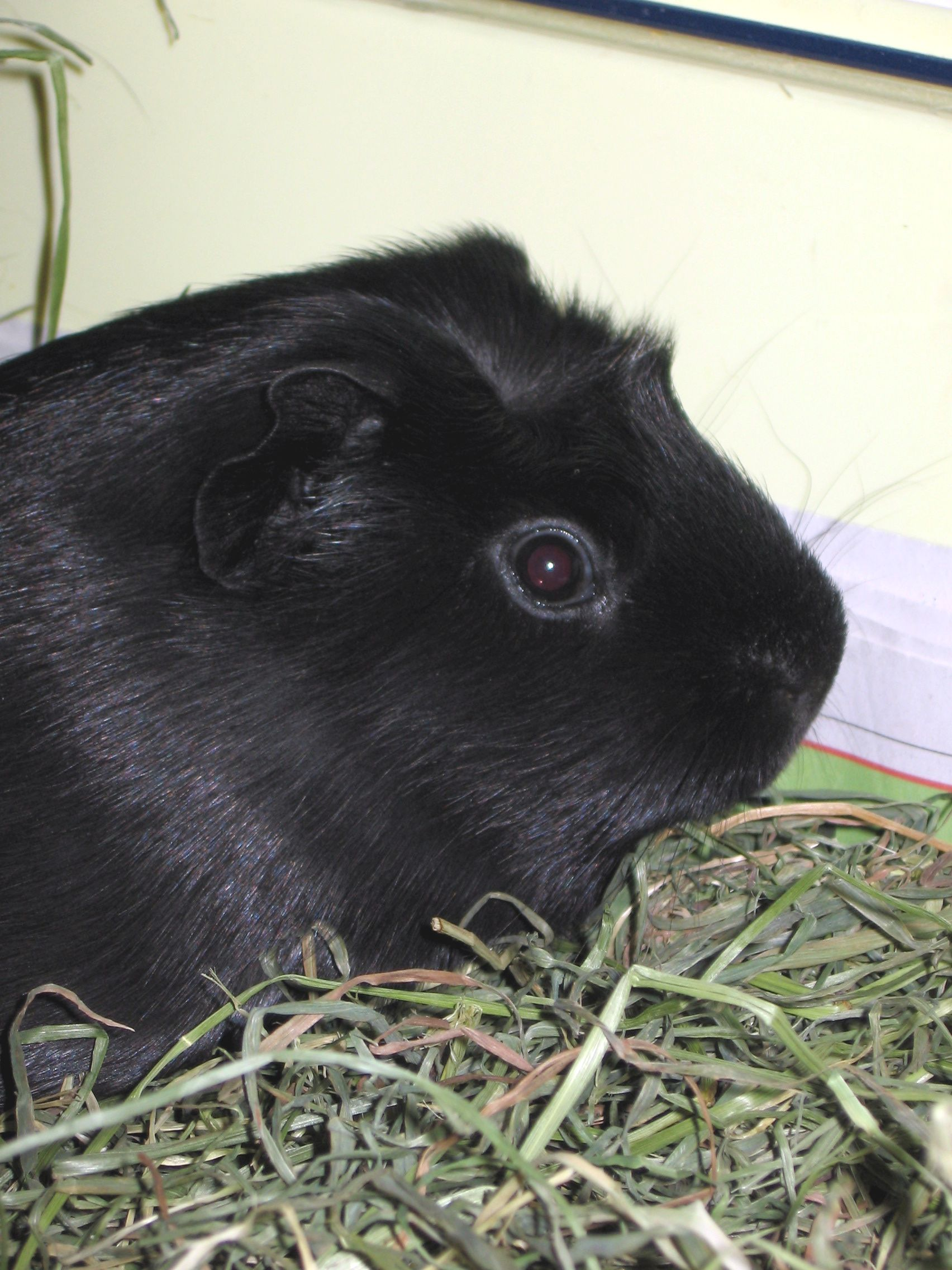
Melanistic guinea pigs (Cavia porcellus) are rare, and are used in rituals by Andean curanderos.

Pseudomelanism, also called abundism, is another variant of pigmentation, identifiable by dark spots or enlarged stripes, which cover a large part of the body of an animal, making it appear melanistic.

Melanosis is hyperpigmentation associated with increased melanin, which occurs as part of a number of conditions, some are benign (like freckles). Others are (or can become) malignant. Some conditions are congenital and others are acquired.

== Adaptation ==
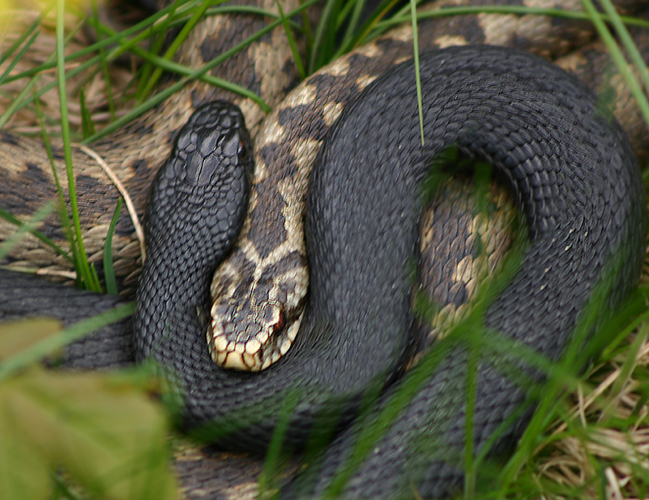
A melanistic European adder (Vipera berus) compared to a normal-colored adder

Melanism related to the process of adaptation is called adaptive melanism. Most commonly, dark individuals become fitter to survive and reproduce in their environment as they are better camouflaged. This makes some species less conspicuous to predators, while others, such as leopards, use it as a foraging advantage during night hunting. Typically, adaptive melanism is heritable: A dominant allele, which is entirely or nearly entirely expressed in the phenotype, is responsible for the excessive amount of melanin. By contrast, adaptive melanism associated with Batesian mimicry in Zelandoperla fenestrata stoneflies is controlled by a recessive allele at the ebony locus.

A more replicated example of human-induced shifts in melanism has arisen from repeated selection against melanic Zelandoperla fenestrata stonefly phenotypes following widespread deforestation in New Zealand.

=== Industrial melanism ===
Industrial melanism is an evolutionary effect in insects such as the peppered moth, Biston betularia in areas subject to industrial pollution. Darker pigmented individuals are favored by natural selection, apparently because they are better camouflaged against polluted backgrounds. When pollution was later reduced, lighter forms regained the advantage and melanism became less frequent. Other explanations have been proposed, such as that the melanin pigment enhances function of immune defences, or a thermal advantage from the darker coloration.

== In mammals ==
Melanistic morphs are common in many mammal species. One example is black squirrels, which can refer to a melanistic morph of either the Eastern gray squirrel or the fox squirrel.

=== In felines ===
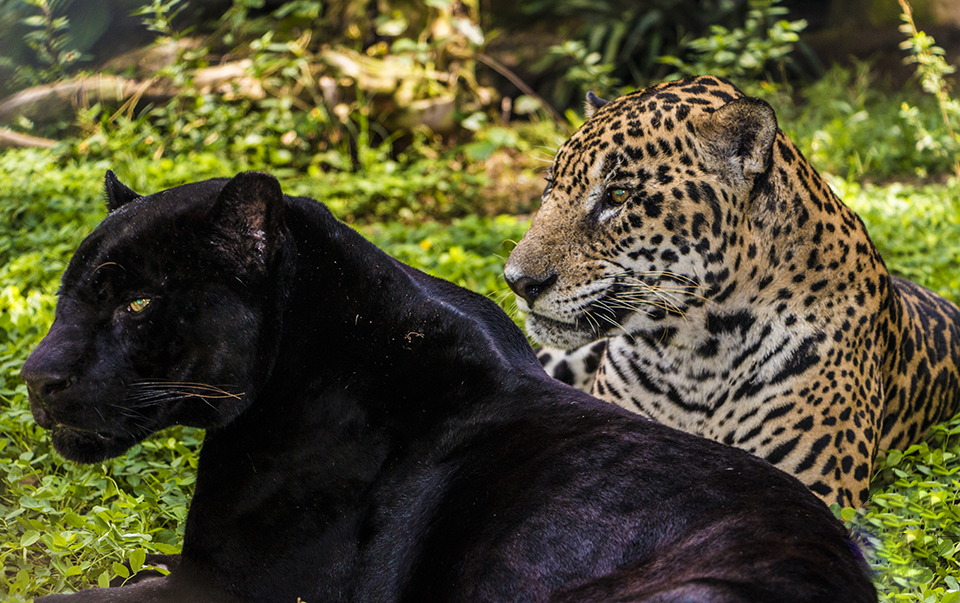
Melanistic and normally coloured jaguars

Many species of the cat family exhibit melanistic morphs, particularly those in which the coat is usually spotted. Melanistic leopards and jaguars are referred to as black panthers.

In 1938 and 1940, two melanistic bobcats were trapped alive in sub-tropical Florida.

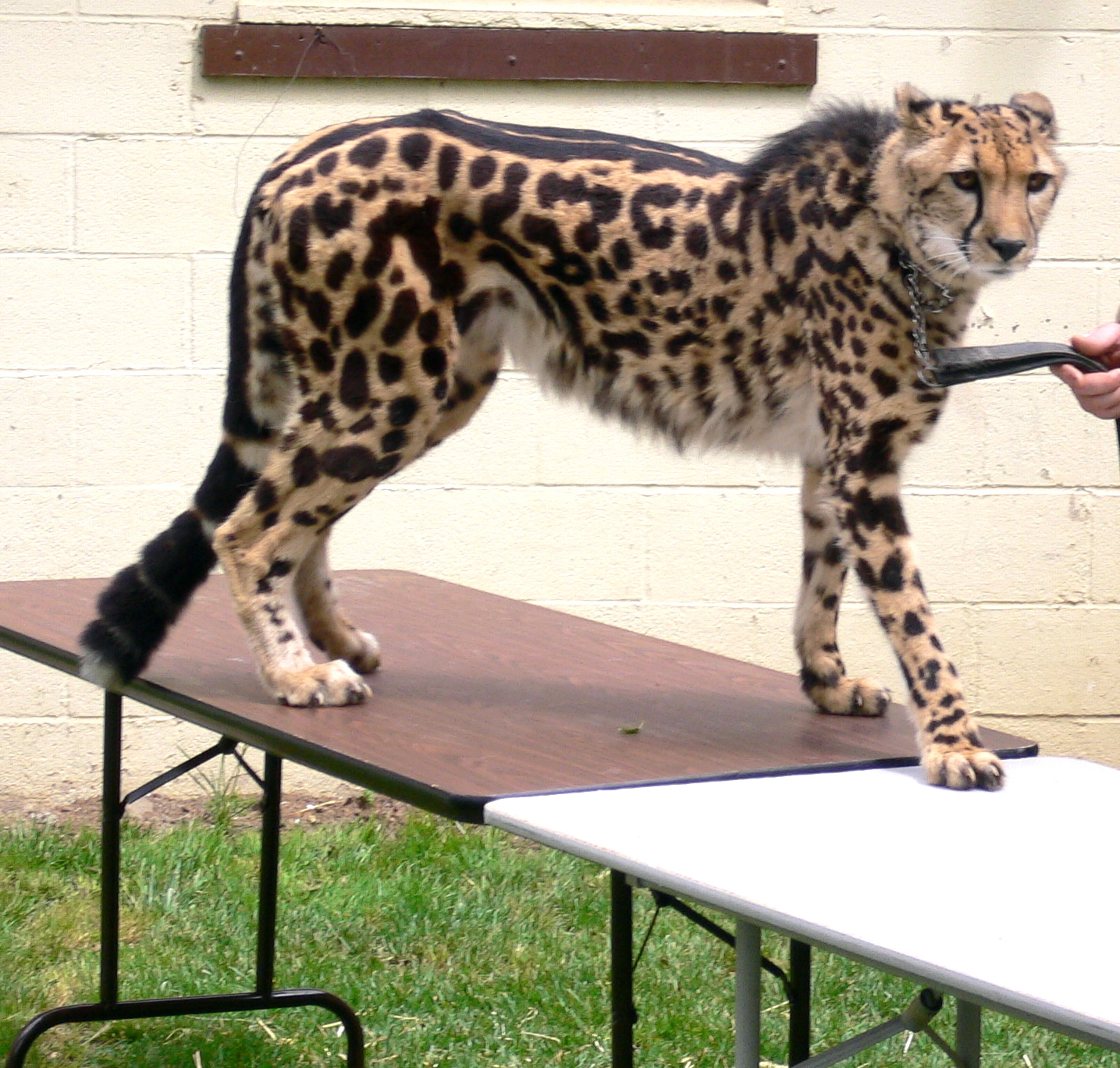
Pseudomelanism on a cheetah, resulting in blotchy, irregular spotting

In 2003, the dominant mode of inheritance of melanism in jaguars was confirmed by performing phenotype-transmission analysis in a 116-individual captive pedigree. Melanistic animals were found to carry at least one copy of a mutant MC1R sequence allele, bearing a 15-base pair inframe deletion. Ten unrelated melanistic jaguars were either homozygous or heterozygous for this allele. A 24-base pair deletion causes the incompletely dominant allele for melanism in the jaguarundi. Sequencing of the agouti signalling peptide in the agouti gene coding region revealed a 2-base pair deletion in black domestic cats. These variants were absent in melanistic individuals of Geoffroy's cat, oncilla, pampas cat and Asian golden cat, suggesting that melanism arose independently at least four times in the cat family.

Melanism in leopards is inherited as a Mendelian, monogenic recessive trait relative to the spotted form. Pairings of black animals have a significantly smaller litter size than other possible pairings. Between January 1996 and March 2009, Indochinese leopards were photographed at 16 sites in the Malay Peninsula in a sampling effort of more than 1000 trap nights. Of 445 photographs of melanistic leopards, 410 were taken south of the Kra Isthmus, where the non-melanistic morph was never photographed. These data suggest the near fixation of the dark allele in the region. The expected time to fixation of this recessive allele due to genetic drift alone ranged from about 1,100 years to about 100,000 years. Melanism in leopards has been hypothesized to be causally associated with a selective advantage for ambush. Other theories are that genes for melanism in felines may provide resistance to viral infections, or a high-altitude adaptation, since black fur absorbs more light for warmth.

== In birds ==
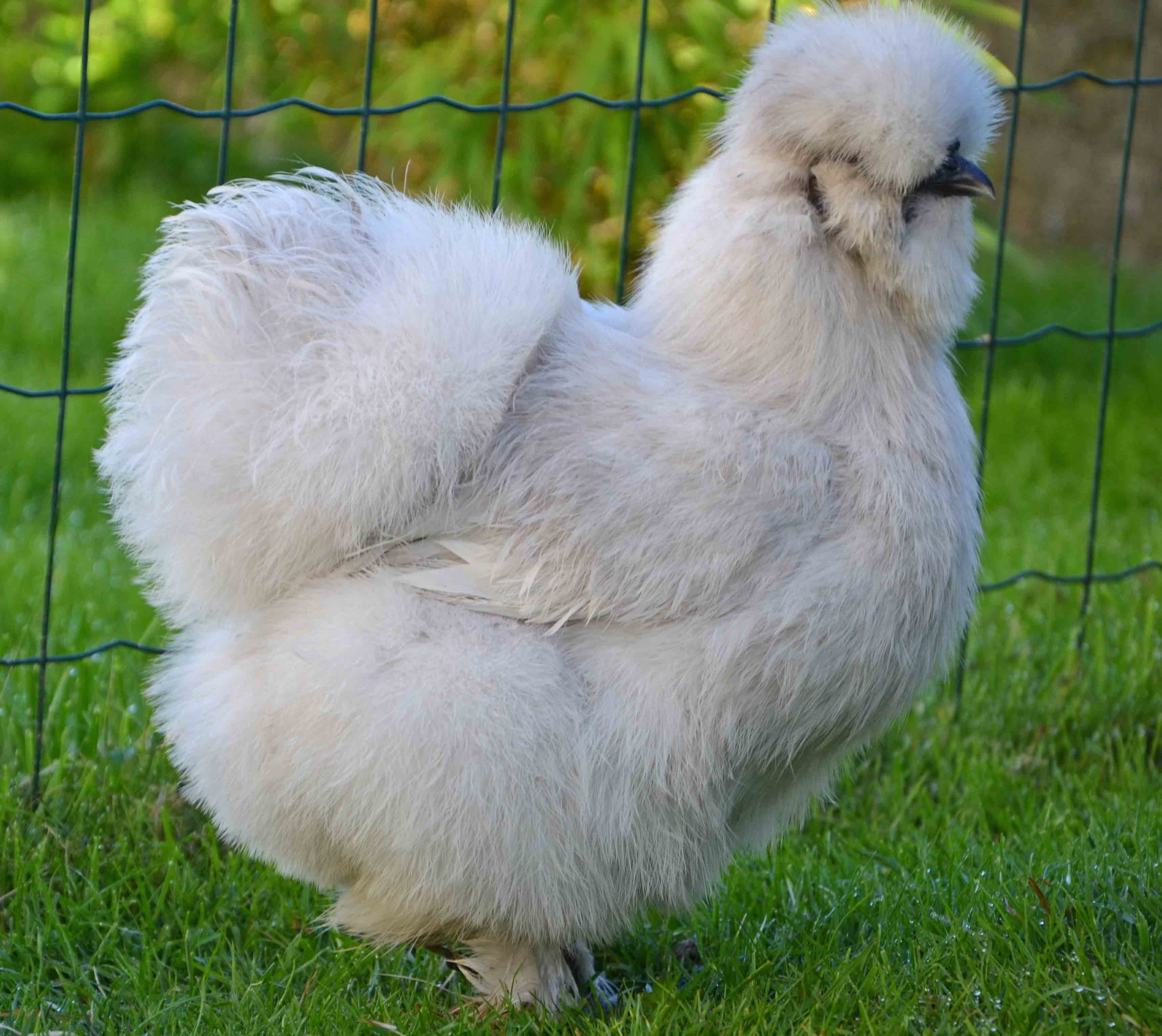
White Silkie rooster

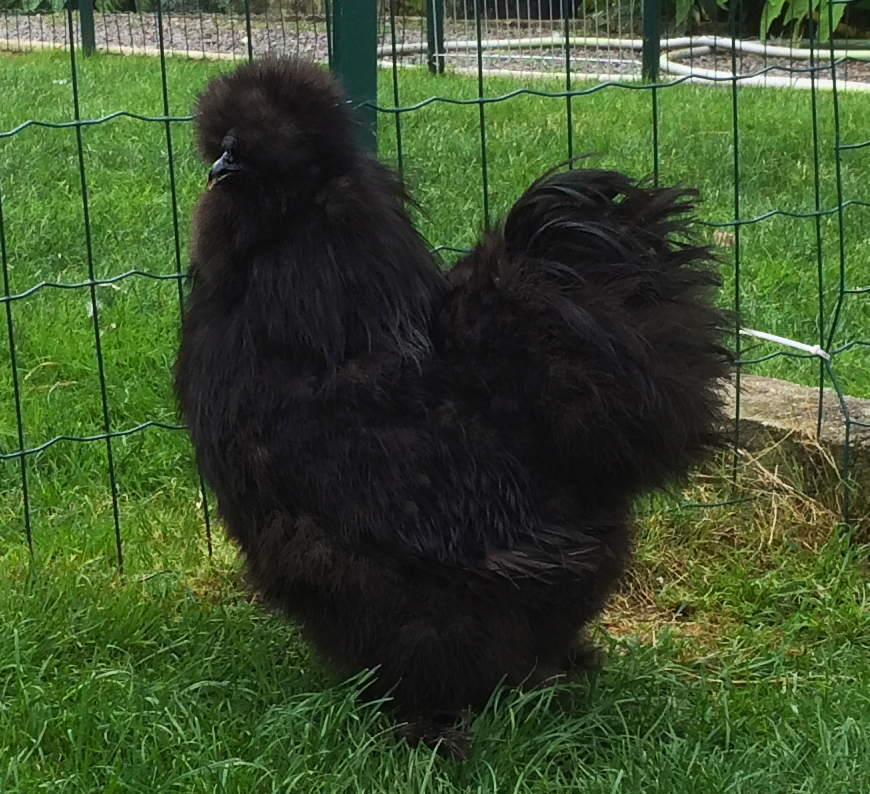
Black Silkie rooster

The chicken breeds Silkie and Ayam Cemani commonly exhibit this trait. Ayam Cemani is an uncommon and relatively modern breed of chicken from Indonesia. They have a dominant gene that causes hyperpigmentation (Fibromelanosis), making the chicken entirely black; including feathers, beak, and internal organs. Melanistic common pheasants are intentionally bred and released as game birds.

Melanism in feral rock doves is quite common, especially if the species is abundant in the area. The amount of pigmentation varies, from a slightly darker pigmentation in the pigeon’s wings, to being almost completely black.

In April 2015, an extremely rare black flamingo was spotted on the Mediterranean island of Cyprus.

Melanism is observed rarely in a number of penguin species.

== In amphibians ==
The alpine salamander, Salamandra atra, has one subspecies (S. atra atra) that is completely black. The pigment comes from a specific cell called a melanophore, which produce the compound melanin.

There are four other subspecies of this salamander, and they have varying levels of melanin pigmentation. The subspecies have yellow spots in different concentrations or proportions. The pigment-producing cells that contribute to the yellow spots of some sub-species are called xanthophores. It appears that the fully-black phenotypes do not ever develop these xanthophores. Alpine salamanders produce a toxin from their skin, and both fully melanistic, black salamanders and spotted individuals produce the compound.

Studies done that traced DNA histories have suggested that the original alpine salamander phenotype was black with some yellow spots, meaning that the fully black color evolved over time and was thus selected for over many generations.

Also, eastern tree frogs, Hyla orientalis, living within the Chornobyl Exclusion Zone have a remarkably darker dorsal skin coloration than frogs from outside the Zone. The observed differences do not seem to be due to short-term changes in skin coloration, or caused by adjustments to background color. This suggest that exposure to high levels of ionizing radiation may have selected for dark skin coloration in Chornobyl tree frogs.

== In humans ==
Melanism, meaning a mutation that results in completely dark skin, does not exist in humans. In humans, the amount of melanin is determined by three dominant alleles (AABBCC), and different ethnicities have varying amounts.

=== Peutz–Jeghers syndrome ===
This rare genetic disorder is characterized by the development of macules with hyperpigmentation on the lips and oral mucosa (melanosis), as well as benign polyps in the gastrointestinal tract.

== Socio-politics ==
The term melanism has been used on Usenet, internet forums and blogs to mean an African-American social movement holding that dark-skinned humans are the original people from which those of other skin color originate. The term melanism has been used in this context as early as the mid-1990s and was promoted by some Afrocentrists, such as Frances Cress Welsing.

== See also ==
- Albinism
  - Albino and white squirrels
- Amelanism, lack of melanin
- Erythrism, reddish pigmentation
- Isabellinism, lowered melanin
- Heterochromia iridum
- Leucism, a partial loss of pigmentation that results in animals with pale or white skin, hair and/or feathers
- Melanosis, hyperpigmentation via increased melanin
  - Ocular melanosis
- Peutz–Jeghers syndrome, dark patches on the lips etc.
- Piebaldism, patchy absence of melanin-producing cells
- Vitiligo, a skin condition which causes areas of the skin to lose its colour
- Xanthochromism, an unusual yellow colouration in animals
- Zelandoperla fenestrata, a stonefly exhibiting a Batesian mimicry melanic polymorphism

== Bibliography ==
- David Attenborough (2002). The Life of Mammals (TV-Series and book). United Kingdom: BBC.
- Kettlewell, Bernard (1973). The Evolution of Melanism. Clarendon Press. ISBN 0-19-857370-7.
- Majerus, Michael (1998). Melanism: Evolution in Action. Oxford University Press. ISBN 0-19-854982-2.
- Melanism and disease resistance in insects
- Fryer, G. 2013. How should the history of industrial melanism in moths be interpreted? The Linnean. 29 (2): 15 - 22.
