= Batesian mimicry =

Bluffing imitation of a species with strong defenses

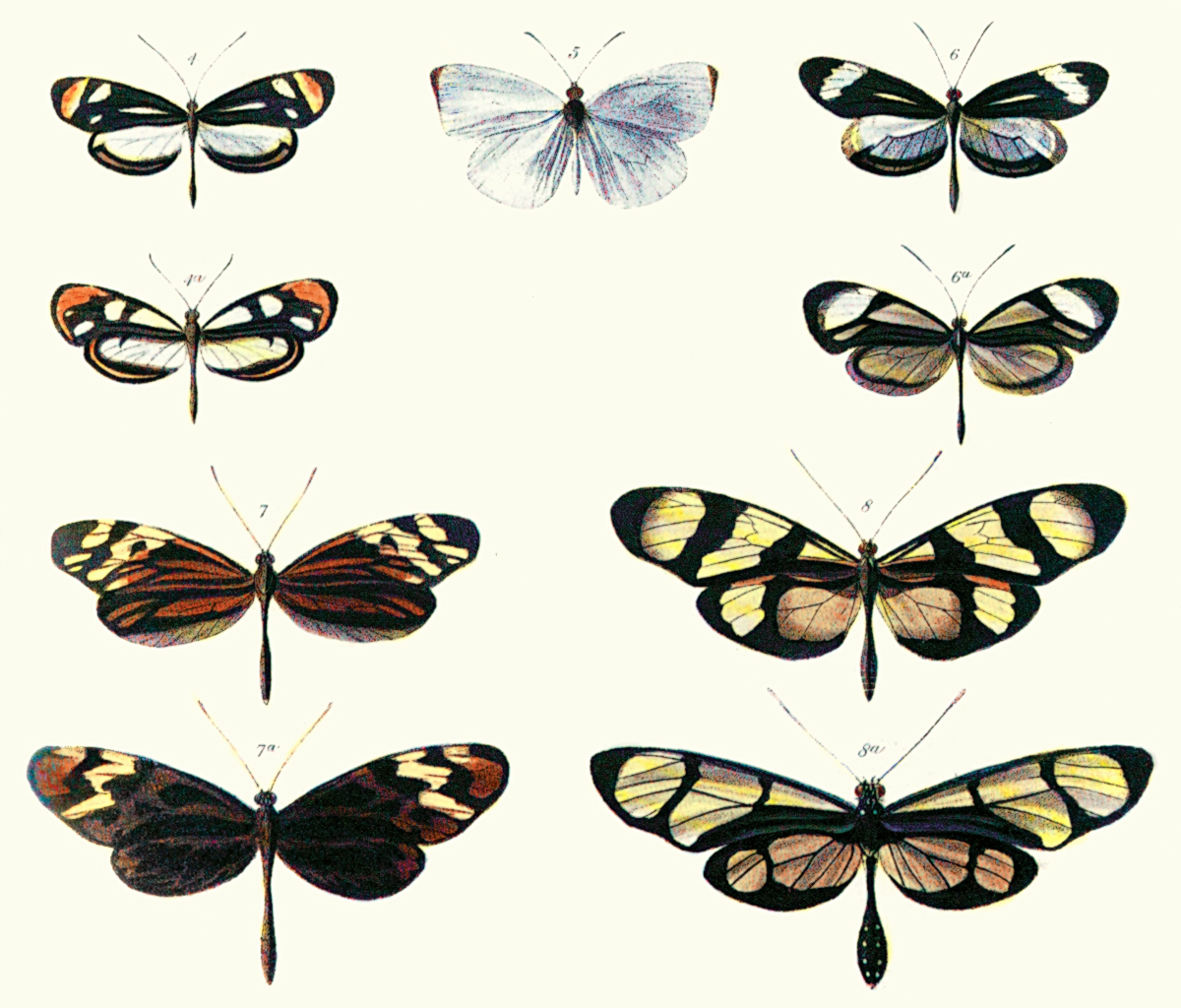
Plate from Bates 1861, illustrating Batesian mimicry between Dismorphia species (top row and third row) and various Ithomiini (Nymphalidae) (second and bottom rows). A non-Batesian species, Pseudopieris nehemia, is in the centre.

Batesian mimicry is a form of mimicry wherein a harmless species has evolved to imitate the warning signals of a harmful species in order to benefit from these signals' tendency to deter their mutual predators. It is named after the English naturalist Henry Walter Bates, who worked on butterflies in the rainforests of Brazil.

Batesian mimicry is the most commonly-known and widely-studied of the mimicry complexes, such that the word "mimicry" is often synonymous with the type described by Batesian mimicry. However, there are many other forms of mimicry, some very similar in principle to the Batesian variety, others far separated.

Batesian mimicry is often compared with Müllerian mimicry, the mutually beneficial, converging appearance of two or more harmful species. Batesian mimicry is often thought to be diametrically opposed to aggressive mimicry, wherein a predator or parasite mimics a harmless species, thereby avoiding detection and improving its odds of a successful hunt.

In scientific studies of biological mimicry the imitating species is called the mimic, while the imitated species (protected by its own toxicity, foul taste or other defenses) is known as the model. The predatory species that mediates the indirect interaction between the mimic and the model (the interaction over evolutionary timescales by which the mimic approaches the model in appearance) is variously known as the [signal] receiver, the dupe or the operator.

By parasitising the honest warning signal of the model, the Batesian mimic gains an advantage without expending the energy required to actually arm itself. The model, on the other hand, is disadvantaged, along with the dupe. If impostors appear in large numbers then positive experiences with, and successful predation upon, the mimic may result in the model being treated as harmless. When the mimics continue to outnumber the model there is also a stronger selective advantage for the predator to distinguish mimic from model. For these reasons, in a given environment, mimics are generally less numerous than models. This is an instance of frequency-dependent selection. Some mimetic populations have evolved multiple forms (polymorphism), enabling them to mimic several different models and thereby to gain greater protection. Batesian mimicry is not always perfect. A variety of explanations have been proposed for this, including limitations in predators' cognition.

While visual signals have attracted the most study, Batesian mimicry can employ deception of any of the senses. For example, auditory Batesian mimicry can be seen in moths that mimic the ultrasonic warning signals transmitted by unpalatable moths to bat predators, while some weakly electric fish appear to mimic the electrolocation signals of strongly electric fish, constituting electrical mimicry.

== Historical background ==
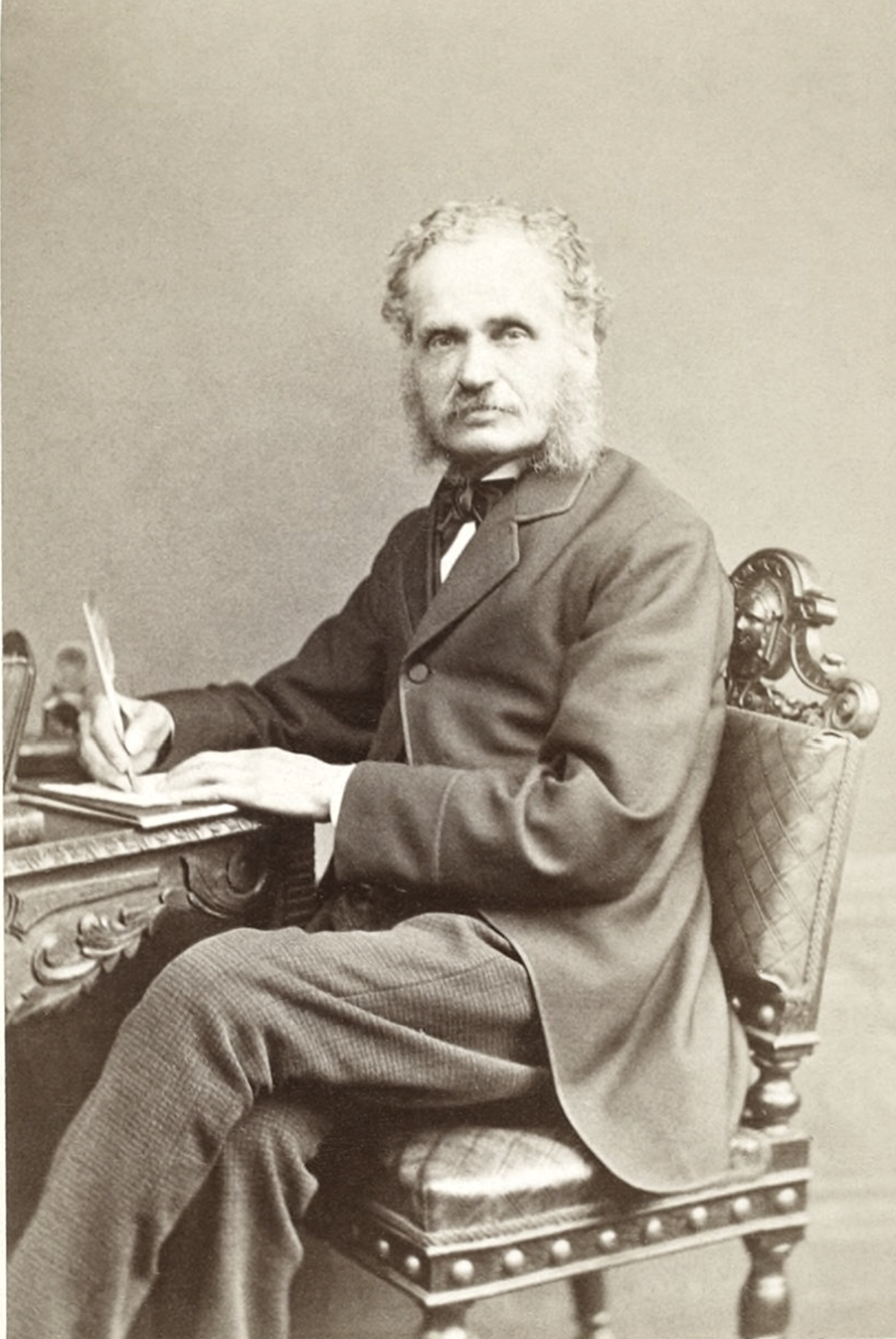
Henry Walter Bates described the form of mimicry that bears his name in 1861.

Henry Walter Bates (1825–1892) was an English explorer-naturalist who surveyed the Amazon rainforest with Alfred Russel Wallace in 1848. While Wallace returned in 1852, Bates remained for over a decade. Bates's field research included collecting almost a hundred species of butterflies from the families Ithomiinae and Heliconiinae, as well as thousands of other insects specimens. In sorting these butterflies into similar groups based on appearance, inconsistencies began to arise. Some appeared superficially similar to others, so much so that even Bates could not tell some species apart based only on wing appearance. However, closer examination of less obvious morphological characters seemed to show that they were not even closely related. Shortly after his return to England, he read a paper on his theory of mimicry at a meeting of the Linnean Society of London on 21 November 1861, which was then published in 1862 as 'Contributions to an Insect Fauna of the Amazon Valley' in the society's Transactions. He elaborated on his experiences further in The Naturalist on the River Amazons.

Bates put forward the hypothesis that the close resemblance between unrelated species was an antipredator adaptation. He noted that some species showed very striking coloration and flew in a leisurely manner, almost as if taunting predators to eat them. He reasoned that these butterflies were unpalatable to birds and other insectivores, and were thus avoided by them. He extended that logic to forms that closely resembled such protected species and mimicked their warning coloration but not their toxicity.

This naturalistic explanation fitted well with the recent account of evolution by Wallace and Charles Darwin, as outlined in his famous 1859 book The Origin of Species. Because the Darwinian explanation required no supernatural forces, it met with considerable criticism from anti-evolutionists, both in academic circles and in the broader social realm.

== Aposematism ==
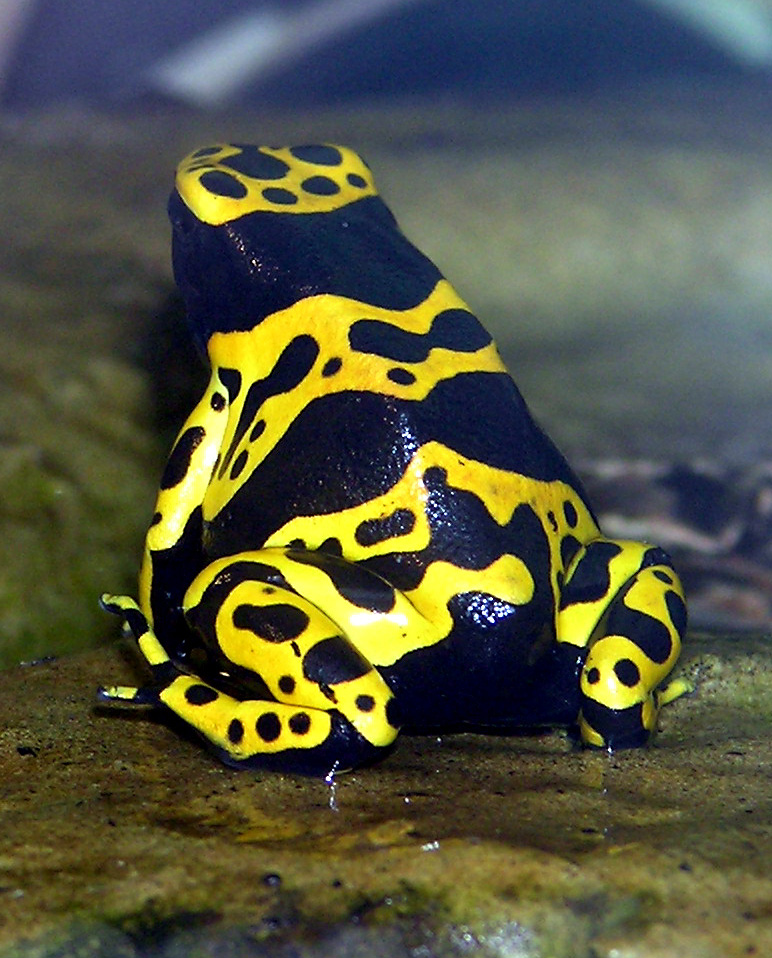
The yellow-banded poison dart frog (Dendrobates leucomelas) has conspicuous aposematic coloration.

Most living things have predators and therefore are in a constant evolutionary arms race to develop antipredator adaptations, while the predator adapts to become more efficient at defeating the prey's adaptations. Some organisms have evolved to make detection less likely, for example by nocturnality and camouflage. Others have developed chemical defences such as the deadly toxins of certain snakes and wasps, or the noxious scent of the skunk. Such prey often send clear and honest warning signals to their attackers with conspicuous aposematic (warning) patterns. The brightness of such warning signs is correlated with the level of toxicity of the organism.

In Batesian mimicry, the mimic effectively copies the coloration of an aposematic animal, known as the model, to deceive predators into behaving as if it were distasteful. (Note: This is often described as parasitizing the honest signals.) The success of this dishonest display depends on the level of toxicity of the model and the abundance of the model in the geographical area. The more toxic the model is, the more likely it is that the predator will avoid the mimic. The abundance of the model species is also important for the success of the mimic because of frequency-dependent selection. When the model is abundant, mimics with imperfect model patterns or slightly different coloration from the model are still avoided by predators. This is because the predator has a strong incentive to avoid potentially lethal organisms, given the likelihood of encountering one. However, in areas where the model is scarce or locally extinct, mimics are driven to accurate aposematic coloration. This is because predators attack imperfect mimics more readily where there is little chance that they are the model species. Frequency-dependent selection may also have driven Batesian mimics to become polymorphic in rare cases where a single genetic switch controls appearance, as in the swallowtail butterflies (the Papilionidae) such as the pipevine swallowtail, and in the New Zealand stonefly Zelandoperla fenestrata.

Batesian vs Müllerian mimicry: the former is deceptive, the latter honest.

== Classification and comparisons ==
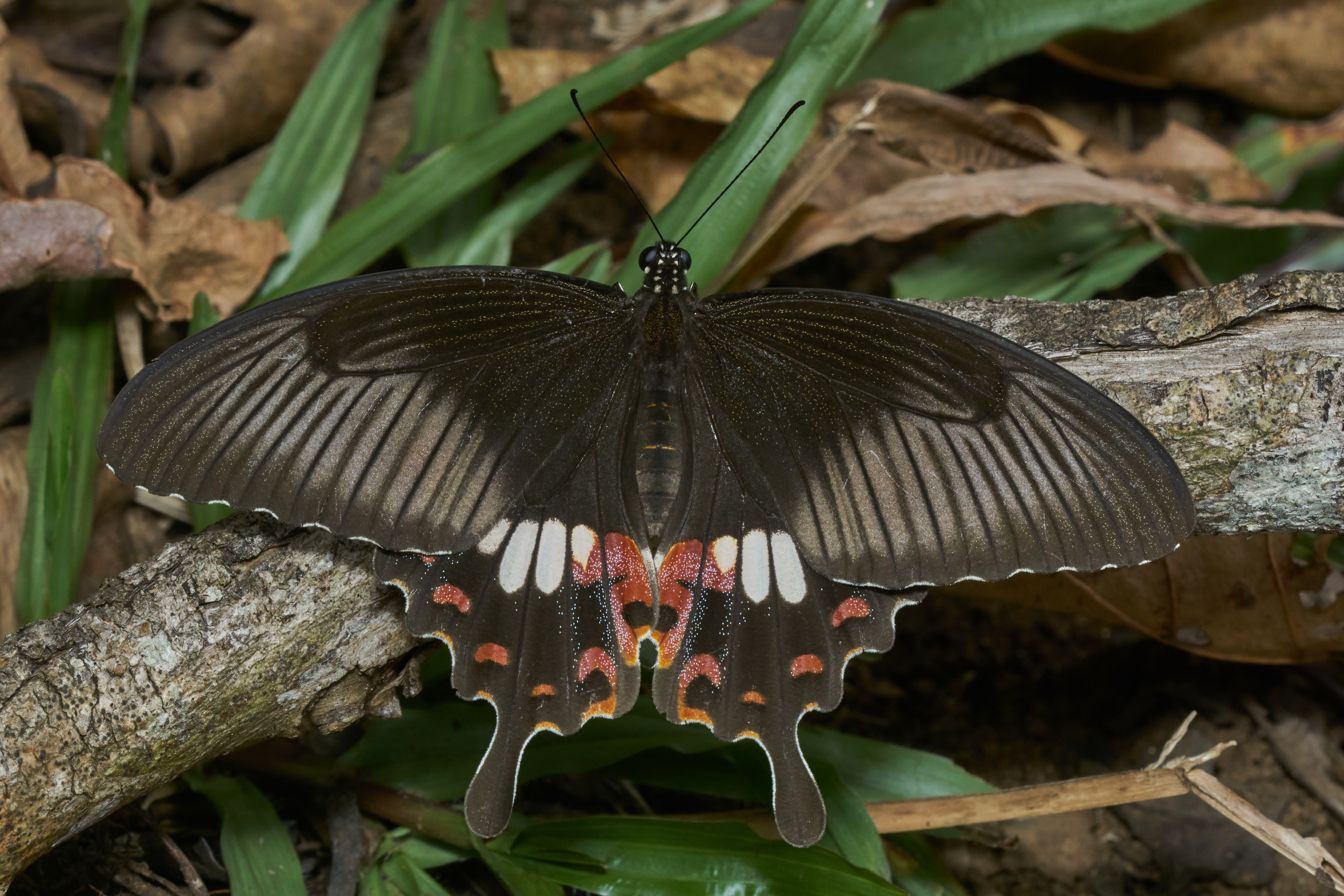
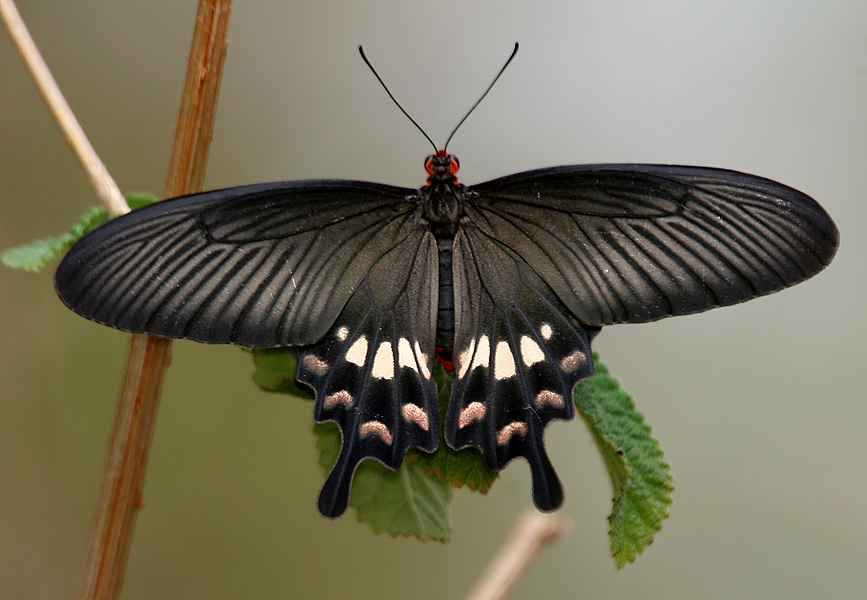
A well-known mimic, Papilio polytes (top) resembles the unpalatable Pachliopta aristolochiae (bottom).

Batesian mimicry is a case of protective or defensive mimicry, where the mimic does best by avoiding confrontations with the signal receiver. It is a disjunct system, which means that all three parties are from different species. An example would be the robber fly Mallophora bomboides, which is a Batesian mimic of its bumblebee model and prey, B. americanorum (now more commonly known as Bombus pensylvanicus), which is noxious to predators due to its sting.

Batesian mimicry stands in contrast to other forms such as aggressive mimicry, where the mimic profits from interactions with the signal receiver. One such case of this is in fireflies, where females of one species mimic the mating signals of another species, deceiving males to come close enough for them to eat. Mimicry sometimes does not involve a predator at all though. Such is the case in dispersal mimicry, where the mimic once again benefits from the encounter. For instance, some fungi have their spores dispersed by insects by smelling like carrion. In protective mimicry, the meeting between mimic and dupe is not such a fortuitous occasion for the mimic, and the signals it mimics tend to lower the probability of such an encounter.

A case somewhat similar to Batesian mimicry is that of mimetic weeds, which imitate agricultural crops. In weed or Vavilovian mimicry, the weed survives by having seeds which winnowing machinery identifies as belonging to the crop. Vavilovian mimicry is not Batesian, because humans and crops are not enemies. By contrast, a leaf-mimicking plant, the chameleon vine, employs Batesian mimicry by adapting its leaf shape and colour to match that of its host to deter herbivores from eating its edible leaves.

Another analogous case within a single species has been termed Browerian mimicry (after Lincoln P. Brower and Jane Van Zandt Brower). This is a case of automimicry; the model is the same species as its mimic. Equivalent to Batesian mimicry within a single species, it occurs when there is a palatability spectrum within a population of harmful prey. For example, monarch (Danaus plexippus) caterpillars feed on milkweed species of varying toxicity. Some feed on more toxic plants and store these toxins within themselves. The more palatable caterpillars thus profit from the more toxic members of the same species.

Another important form of protective mimicry is Müllerian mimicry, discovered by and named after the naturalist Fritz Müller. In Müllerian mimicry, both model and mimic are aposematic, so mimicry may be mutual, does not necessarily (Note: Müllerian mimicry in its simplest form is not a bluff at all, but since toxicity is relative, there is a spectrum of mimicry from Batesian to Müllerian.) constitute a bluff or deception and as in the wasps and bees may involve many species in a mimicry ring.

== Imperfect Batesian mimicry ==
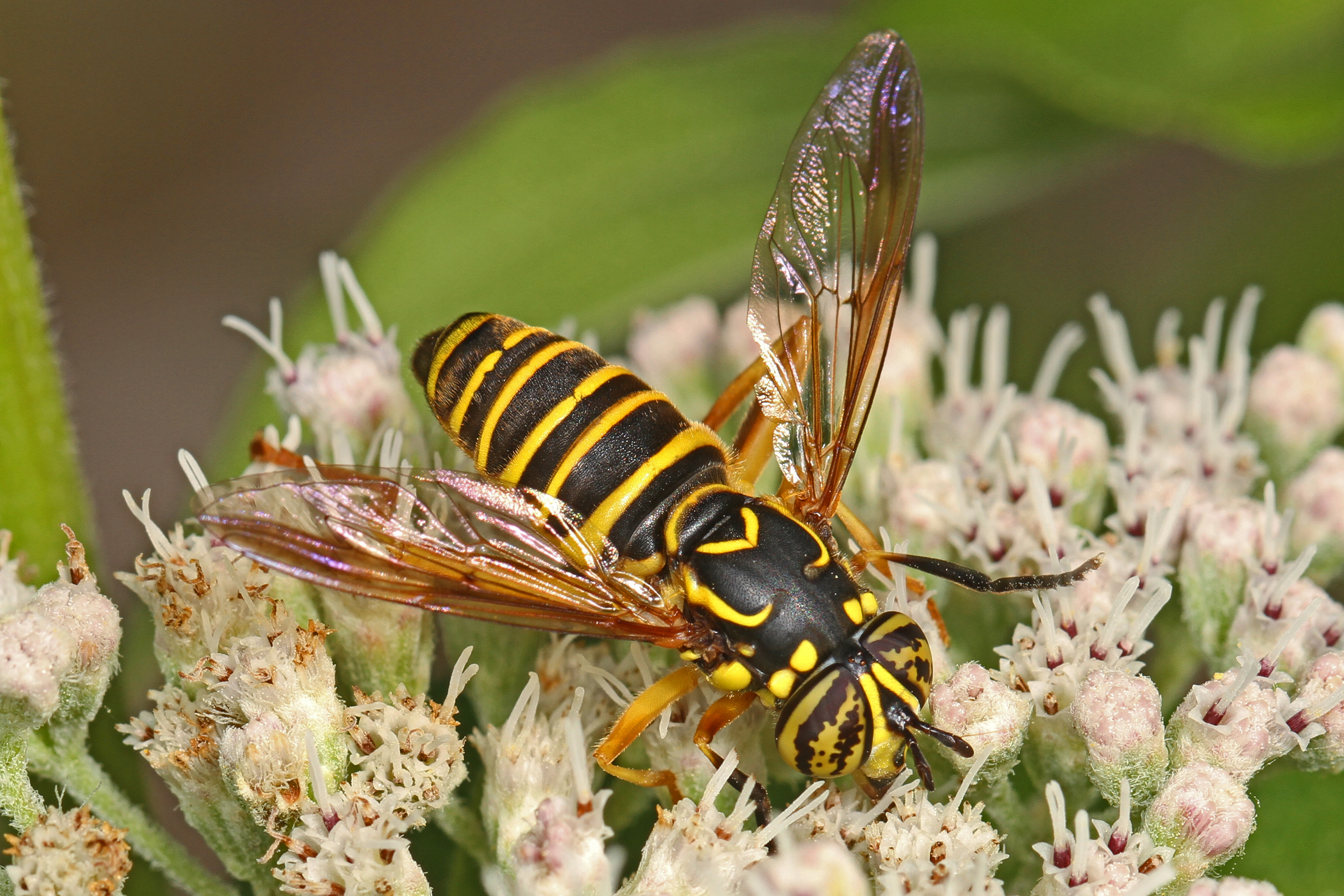
The hoverfly Spilomyia longicornis is an imperfect Batesian mimic of wasps, lacking their long antennae and wasp waist.

In imperfect Batesian mimicry, the mimics do not exactly resemble their models. An example of this is the fly Spilomyia longicornis, which mimics vespid wasps. However, it is not a perfect mimic. Wasps have long black antennae and this fly does not. Instead, they wave their front legs above their heads to look like the antennae on the wasps. Many reasons have been suggested for imperfect mimicry. Imperfect mimics may simply be evolving towards perfection. They may gain advantage from resembling multiple models at once. Humans may not evaluate mimics in the same way as actual predators. Mimics may confuse predators by resembling both model and nonmimic at the same time (satyric mimicry). Kin selection may enforce poor mimicry. The selective advantage of better mimicry may not outweigh the advantages of other strategies like thermoregulation or camouflage.

Only certain traits may be required to deceive predators; for example, tests on the sympatry/allopatry border (where the two are in the same area, and where they are not) of the mimic Lampropeltis elapsoides and the model Micrurus fulvius showed that color proportions in these snakes were important in deceiving predators but that the order of the colored rings was not.

== Plants mimicking ants ==
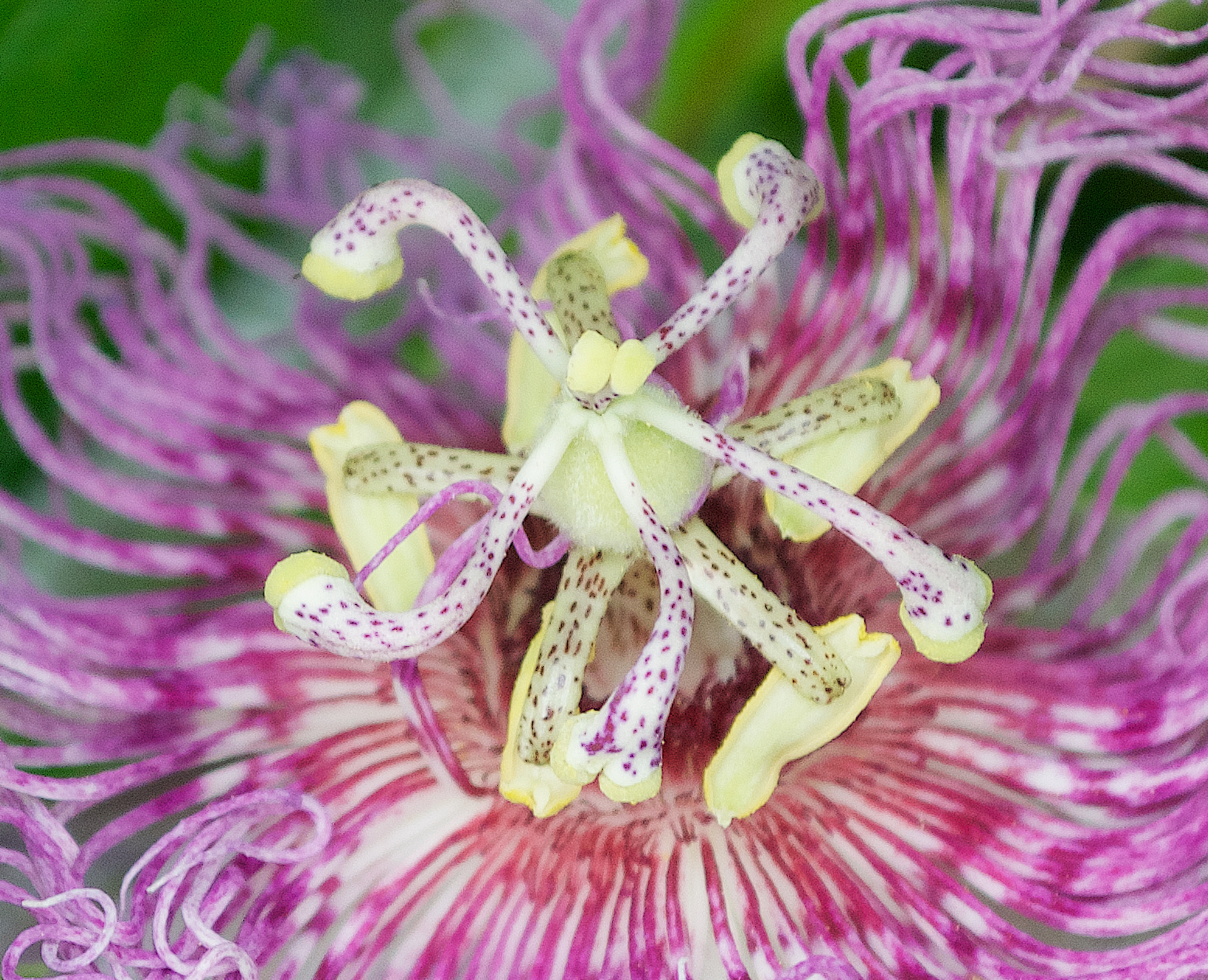
The elongated spots on the reproductive organs of Passiflora incarnata may mimic ants to deter herbivores.

Batesian mimicry of ants appears to have evolved in certain plants, as a visual anti-herbivory strategy, analogous to a herbivorous insect's mimicking a well-defended insect to deter predators. Passiflora flowers of at least 22 species, such as P. incarnata, have dark dots and stripes on their flowers thought to serve this purpose.

== Acoustic mimicry ==
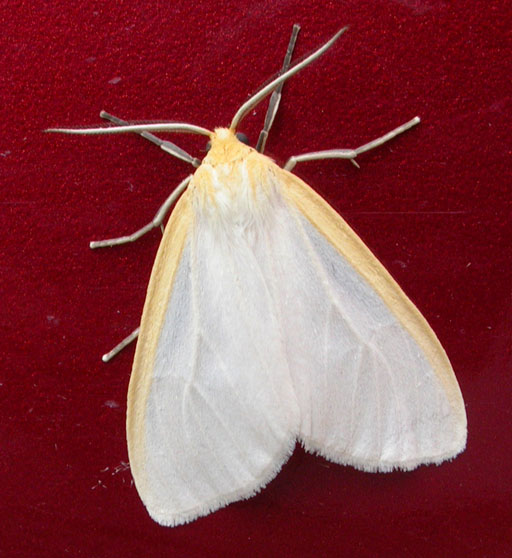
Tiger moths like Cycnia tenera are aposematic by sound, emitting ultrasonic warning signals. They are mimicked by pyralid moths, which are not foul-tasting but emit similar sounds.

Predators may identify their prey by sound as well as sight; mimics have accordingly evolved to deceive the hearing of their predators. Bats are nocturnal predators that rely on echolocation to detect their prey. Some potential prey are unpalatable to bats, and produce an ultrasonic aposematic signal, the auditory equivalent of warning coloration. In response to echolocating red bats and big brown bats, tiger moths such as Cycnia tenera produce warning sounds. Bats learn to avoid the harmful moths, but similarly avoid other species such as some pyralid moths that produce such warning sounds as well. Acoustic mimicry complexes, both Batesian and Müllerian, may be widespread in the auditory world.

== Electrical mimicry ==
The electric eel, Electrophorus, is capable of delivering a powerful electric shock that can stun or kill its prey. Bluntnose knifefishes, Brachyhypopomus, create an electric discharge pattern similar to the low voltage electrolocation discharge of the electric eel. This is thought to be Batesian mimicry of the powerfully protected electric eel.

== See also ==
- Phylogenetics of mimicry
- Papilio dardanus (females mimic multiple model species)
- Locomotor mimicry
