= Leptoperla cacuminis =

Conservation status
- Vulnerable (IUCN 3.1)

Scientific classification
- Kingdom: Animalia
- Phylum: Arthropoda
- Class: Insecta
- Order: Plecoptera
- Family: Gripopterygidae
- Genus: Leptoperla
- Species: L. cacuminis

Binomial name
- Leptoperla cacuminis Hynes, 1974

Species of stonefly

Leptoperla cacuminis is a species of stonefly in the family Gripopterygidae. It is endemic to Australia.
