= Locomotor mimicry =

Form of animal mimicry

Locomotor mimicry is a subtype of Batesian mimicry in which animals avoid predation by mimicking the movements of another species phylogenetically separated. This can be in the form of mimicking a less desirable species or by mimicking the predator itself. Animals can show similarity in swimming, walking, or flying of their model animals.

The complex interaction between mimics, models, and predators (sometimes called observers) can help explain similarities amongst species beyond ideas that emerge from evolutionary comparative approaches. In terms of overall movement, the continuous locomotor mimicry of a species that differs anatomically from the mimic may increase metabolic cost. However, the benefit of avoiding predation appears to outweigh the increased energy cost, because mimicking animals tend to have higher survival rates than their non-mimicking counterparts.

== Terrestrial locomotor mimicry ==
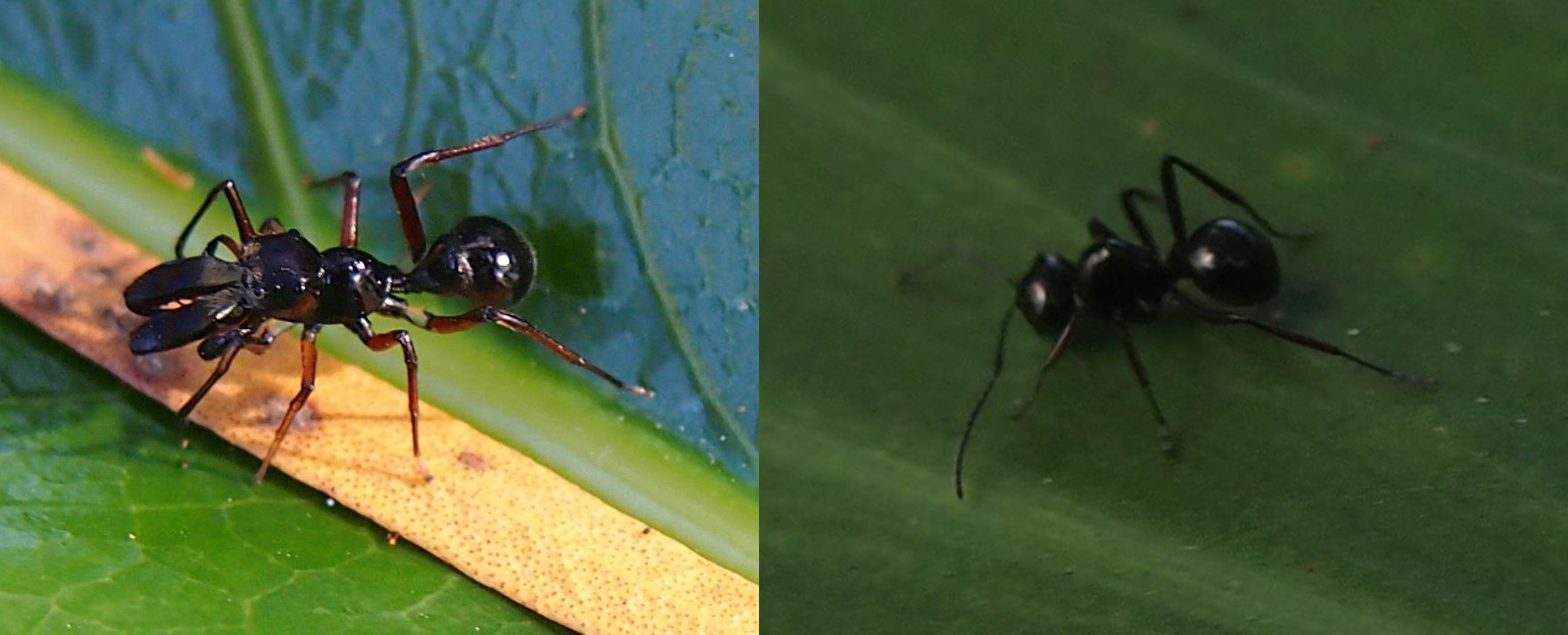
Ant Mimic Spider (Myrmarachne sp.) (left) with a worker Rattle Ant (Polyrhachis australis), the ant species that the spider mimics

The most common form of locomotor terrestrial mimicry is found in ant-mimicking spiders. These mimics are capable of antennal illusions and similar gait patterns as an ant, which is shown in the jumping spider family (Araneae, Salticidae). Mimetic jumping spiders imitate the zig-zag trajectories of ants.

It was once thought that these ant-mimicking spiders walk on six legs instead of eight so that they could use a set of legs to mimic ant antennae.

Another example is seen in salticid-mimicking moths. The moths fan out their hind wings and their forewings are raised above their bodies. In this position, the moth's wings look like salticid legs. Moths that resemble the appearance and locomotion of predatory spiders are preyed upon less by the spiders. The spiders even display courtship or territorial behaviour towards the mimics, indicating that the spiders misidentify the moths as conspecifics.

== Aerial locomotor mimicry ==
In butterflies, it is thought that palatability to predators is related to flight components. Typically, fast-flying prey are more palatable, whereas unpalatable species tend to fly more slowly. These flight characteristics could help predators recognize prey as being palatable or unpalatable. Researchers compared the flight patterns of palatable non-mimetic, palatable mimetic, and unpalatable butterflies by looking at directional flight changes of each species. It was determined that the palatable mimetic butterfly species had a significantly different flight pattern compared to the palatable non-mimetic. The palatable mimetic species had a flight pattern that resembled that of their unpalatable models.

Another example of aerial locomotor mimicry is found in the common drone fly (Eristalis tenax) and its presumed model, the western honey bee (Apis mellifera). In analyses of flight sequences, flight velocities, flight trajectories, and time spent hovering, it was found that the flight patterns of common drone flies were more similar to honey bees than to those of other flies. The drone flies and their models both exhibit loops in their flight paths, which is surprising for the drone flies because they are very adept fliers. A likely explanation for this flight behaviour is that, while foraging, the drone flies are at increased risk of predation by birds. Therefore, they alter their flying to resemble the noxious honeybee and avoid predation.

== Inanimate object locomotor mimicry ==
The ghost pipefish is able to blend into its surroundings due to its similarity in colour and motion to sea plants. In order to avoid predators, the organism will sway in the water to resemble underwater vegetation as much as possible.

== See also ==
- Anti-predator adaptation
- Defensive mimicry
