= Riekoperla =

Scientific classification
- Domain: Eukaryota
- Kingdom: Animalia
- Phylum: Arthropoda
- Class: Insecta
- Order: Plecoptera
- Family: Gripopterygidae
- Subfamily: Leptoperlinae
- Genus: Riekoperla; McLellan, 1971

Genus of stoneflies

Riekoperla is a genus of stonefly in the family Gripopterygidae. It contains the following species:

- Riekoperla darlingtoni
