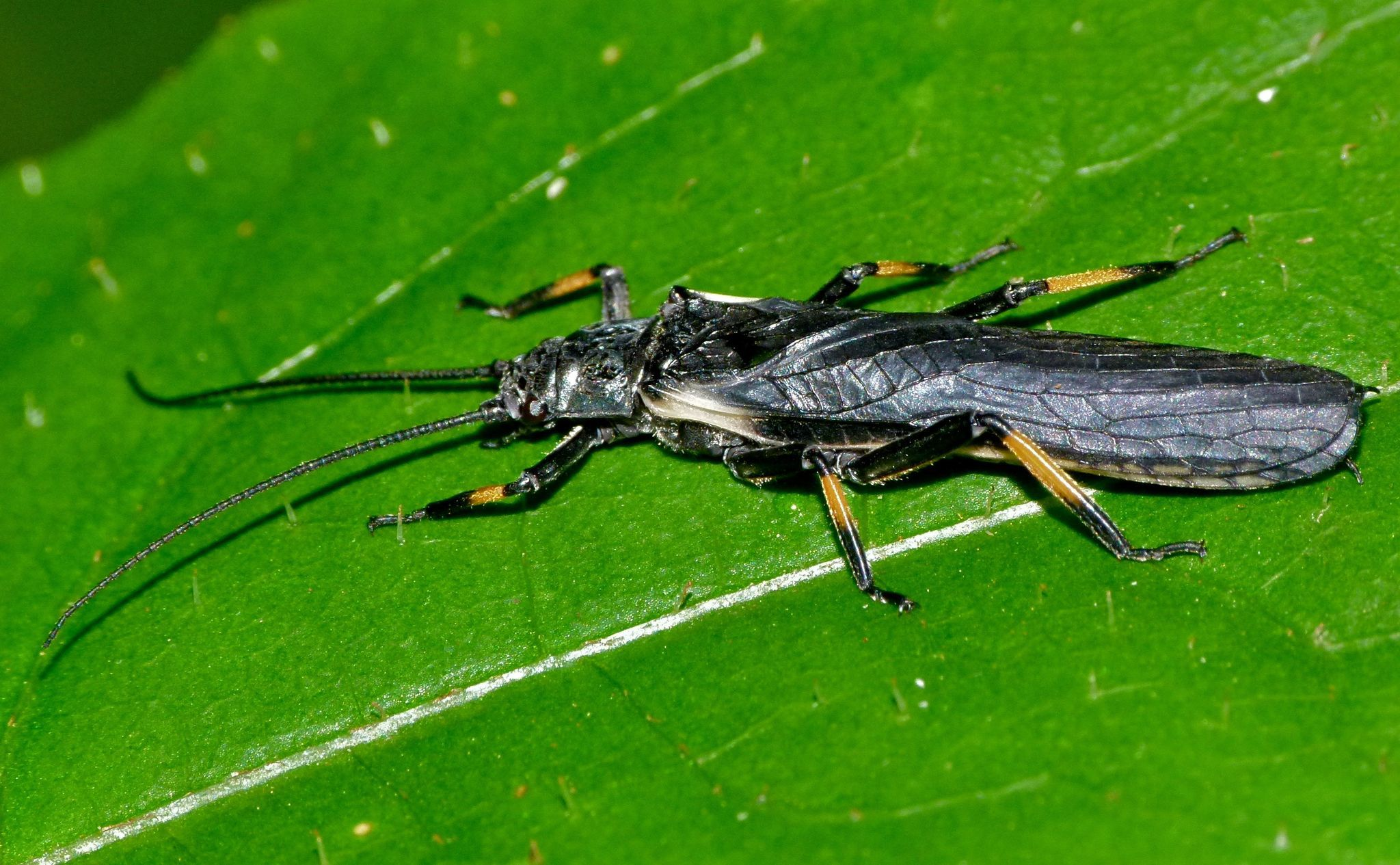
- Austroperla cyrene

Scientific classification
- Kingdom: Animalia
- Phylum: Arthropoda
- Class: Insecta
- Order: Plecoptera
- Suborder: Antarctoperlaria
- Superfamily: Gripopterygoidea
- Family: Austroperlidae; Tillyard, 1921

= Austroperlidae =

Family of stoneflies

Austroperlidae is a family of stoneflies in the order Plecoptera. There are about 10 genera and 15 described species in Austroperlidae across southern land masses Australia, New Zealand, and South America.Austroperlidae species are unique among stoneflies in having aposematic (warning) colouration. For instance, the New Zealand black stonefly Austroperla is a forest dwelling shredder that is toxic to predators due to its production of hydrogen cyanide. The warning colouration of this species is mimicked by several lineages of the unrelated non-toxic New Zealand stonefly Zelandoperla.

== Genera ==
These 10 genera belong to the family Austroperlidae:

- Acruroperla Illies, 1969
- Andesobius McLellan, 2001
- Austroheptura Illies, 1969
- Austropentura Illies, 1969
- Austroperla Needham, 1905
- Crypturoperla Illies, 1969
- Klapopteryx Navás, 1928
- Penturoperla Illies, 1960
- Pseudoheptura Riek, 1973
- Tasmanoperla Tillyard, 1921
