= Leptoperla =

Scientific classification
- Domain: Eukaryota
- Kingdom: Animalia
- Phylum: Arthropoda
- Class: Insecta
- Order: Plecoptera
- Family: Gripopterygidae
- Subfamily: Leptoperlinae
- Genus: Leptoperla; Newman, 1839

Genus of stoneflies

Leptoperla is a genus of stonefly in the family Gripopterygidae. It contains the following species:

- Leptoperla cacuminis
