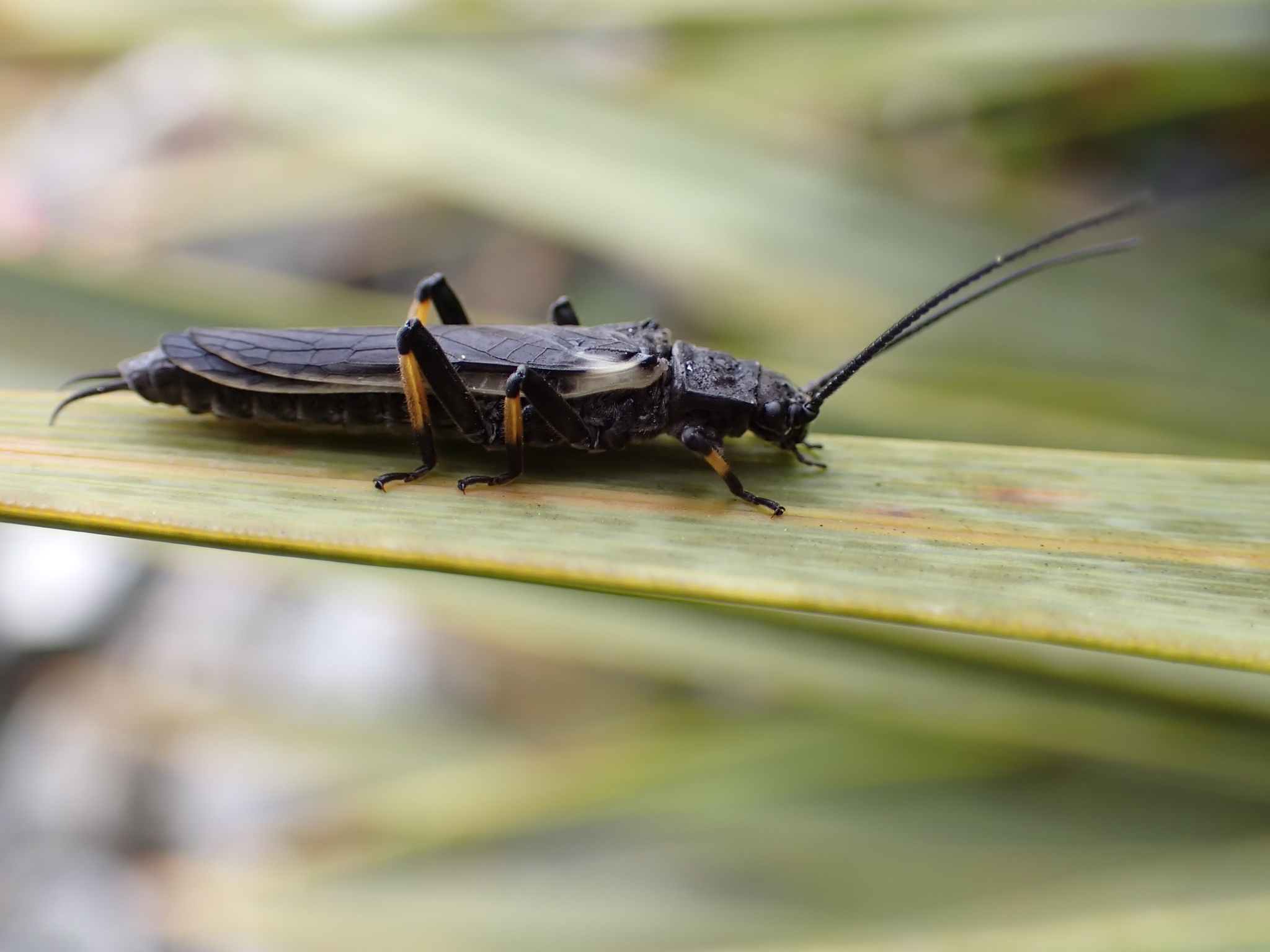

Scientific classification
- Domain: Eukaryota
- Kingdom: Animalia
- Phylum: Arthropoda
- Class: Insecta
- Order: Plecoptera
- Family: Austroperlidae
- Genus: Austroperla; Needham, 1905
- Species: A. cyrene

Binomial name
- Austroperla cyrene (Newman, 1845)

= Austroperla =

Genus of stoneflies

Austroperla cyrene, the black stonefly, is a species of austroperlid stonefly endemic to New Zealand. It is the single species in the genus Austroperla. The species is a 'shredder' that lives and feeds on decomposing wood and leaves in streams throughout New Zealand. It is particularly common in forested streams but relatively rare or absent from deforested streams.

A. cyrene nymphs and adults contain hydrogen cyanide and as a result are toxic to predators. To advertise their toxicity, A. cyrene adults have striking aposematic (warning) colouration, with bright yellow and white colour features against a black background.

This distinctive warning coloration is mimicked by melanic specimens of the non-toxic stoneflies Zelandoperla fenestrata and Taraperla pseudocyrene.

A fossilised specimen of Austroperla has been recorded from early Miocene sediments of Foulden Maar in Central Otago. A phylogenetic study of Southern Hemisphere stoneflies similarly suggests an ancient history for this New Zealand lineage, with Austroperla estimated to have diverged from Australian and Chilean austroperlids around 37 million years ago.
