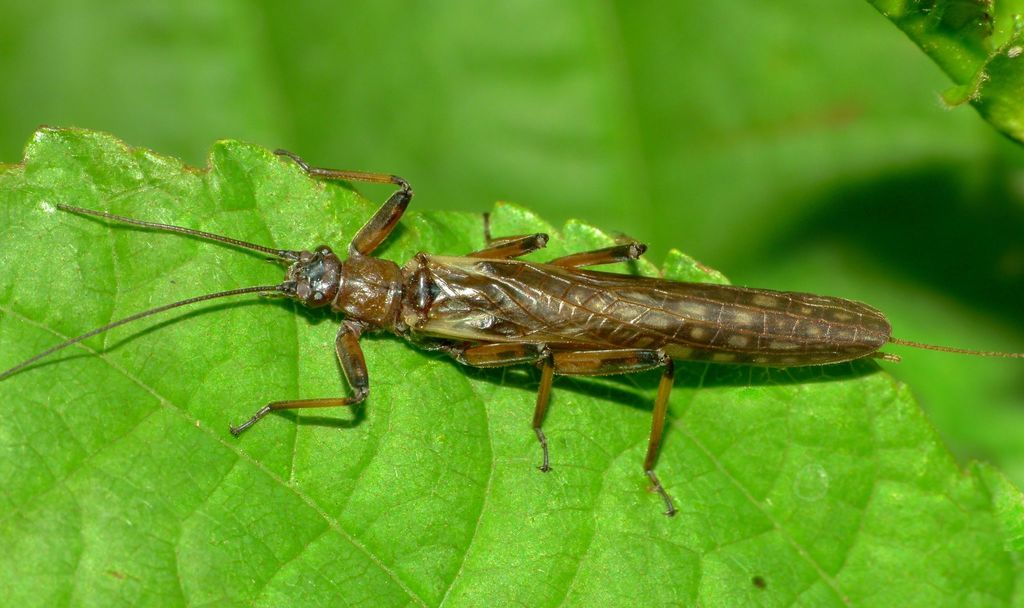

Scientific classification
- Kingdom: Animalia
- Phylum: Arthropoda
- Clade: Pancrustacea
- Class: Insecta
- Order: Plecoptera
- Family: Gripopterygidae
- Genus: Zelandoperla
- Species: Z. fenestrata

Binomial name
- Zelandoperla fenestrata Tillyard, 1923

= Zelandoperla fenestrata =

Species of stonefly

Zelandoperla fenestrata is a widespread endemic New Zealand 'long-tailed' stonefly that is often abundant in high-gradient stony streams, from near sea-level up to alpine elevations. The species name 'fenestrata' refers to the window-like rectangular patterning visible on the wings of non-melanic adult specimens.

This species is highly polymorphic in terms of wing length, with numerous wing-reduced, flightless populations found at high elevations above the alpine treeline. While wing-reduced forms of Z. fenestrata were previously considered to be a distinct species (Z. pennulata), recent genomic research indicates that flightless ecotypes have evolved independently and repeatedly across distinct upland regions of southern New Zealand. Full-winged and vestigial-winged ecotypes within this complex can sometimes be found together in sympatry, and can be either fully interbreeding or reproductively isolated.

Zelandoperla fenestrata also exhibits a striking colour polymorphism, with highly melanic specimens closely mimicking the warning colouration of the co-distributed but unrelated toxic black stonefly Austroperla. Melanic Zelandoperla specimens were previously considered to represent a distinct species (Z. tillyardi) but recent genomic analyses indicate that melanic and non-melanic ecotypes are fully interbreeding and thus conspecific. Recent deforestation in New Zealand has reduced populations of the toxic Austroperla, leading to selection against melanic Zelandoperla specimens in these cleared regions, in a highly replicated example of human-induced evolution.

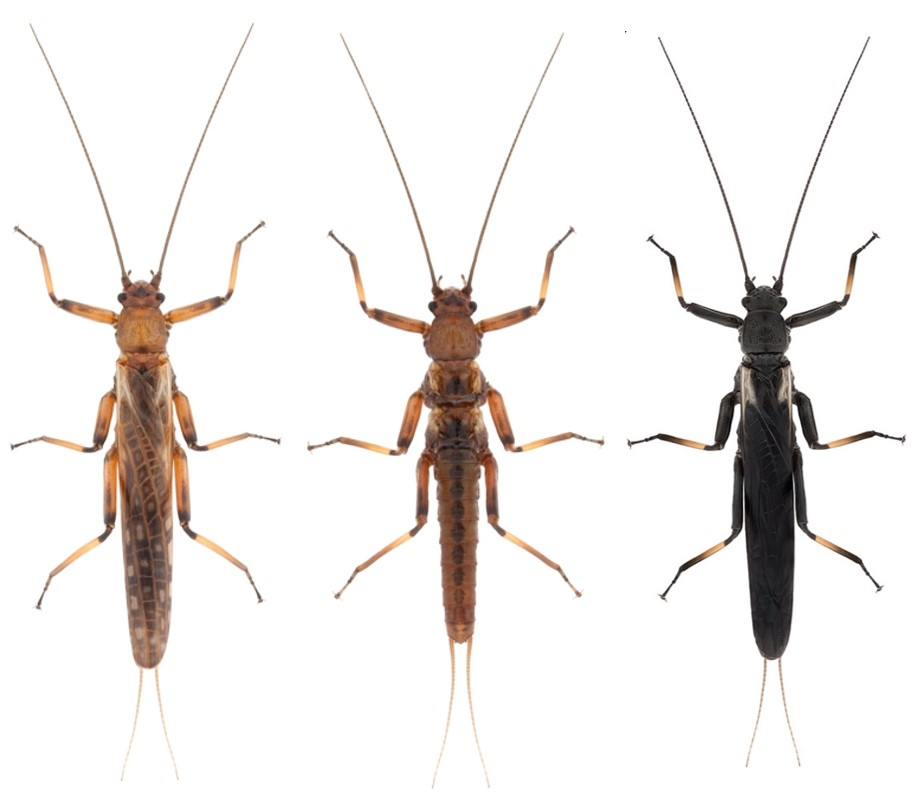
Full-winged (left), vestigial-winged (centre), and melanic (right) ecotypes of Zelandoperla fenestrata

The Banks Peninsula population of the Z. fenestrata species group has highly reduced wings and is thus flightless. This Banks Peninsula lineage is genetically highly divergent from other lineages within the species group, and is now considered to be a distinct but as yet undescribed species. This geographically restricted lineage (Zelandoperla sp. 1 (BJF00160)) was listed as 'Nationally Vulnerable' under the 2018 New Zealand Threat Classification ranking.
