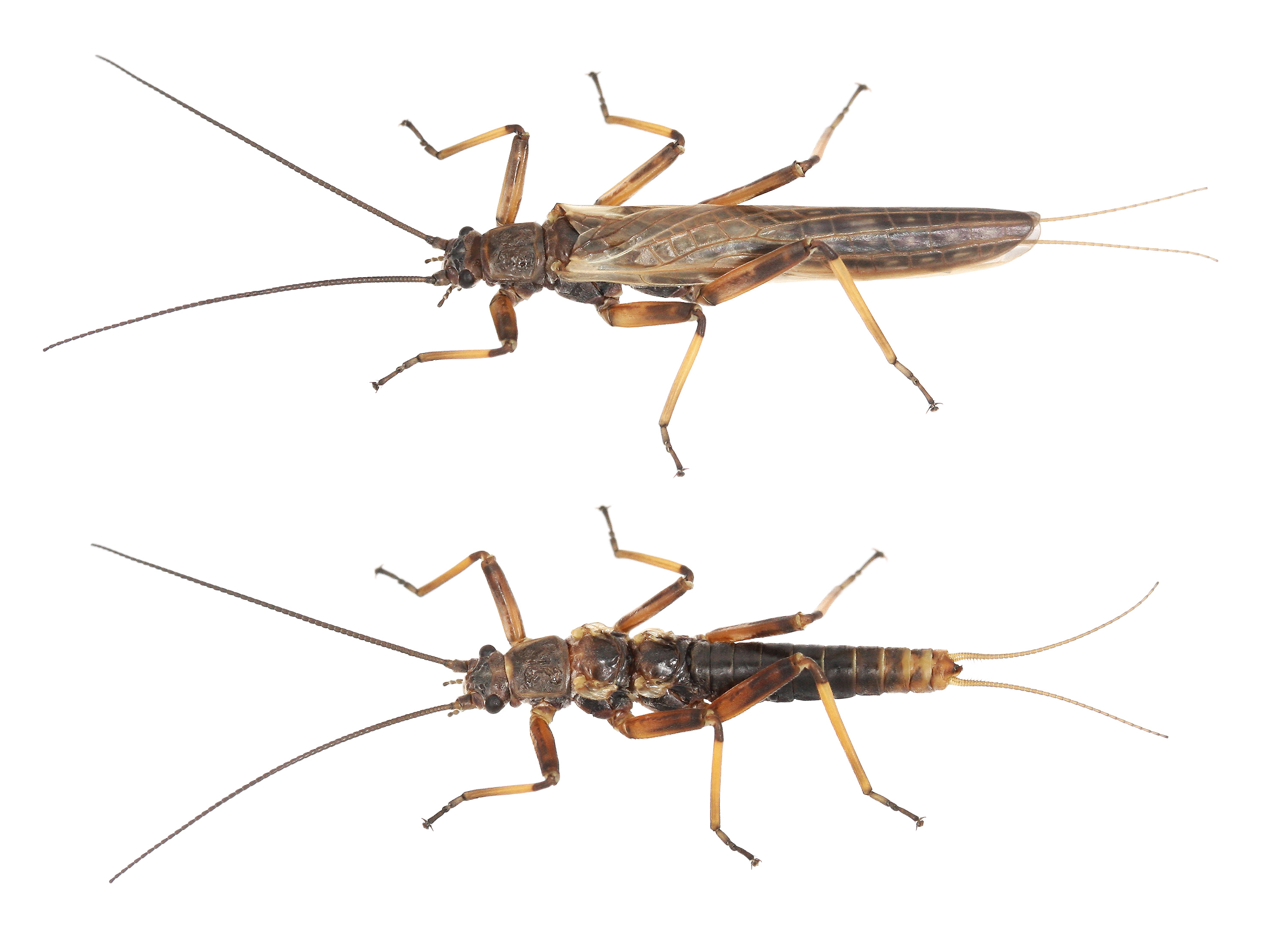
- Zelandoperla fenestrata

Scientific classification
- Domain: Eukaryota
- Kingdom: Animalia
- Phylum: Arthropoda
- Class: Insecta
- Order: Plecoptera
- Family: Gripopterygidae
- Subfamily: Zelandoperlinae
- Genus: Zelandoperla; Tillyard, 1923

= Zelandoperla =

Genus of stoneflies

Zelandoperla is a genus of ‘long-tailed’ stoneflies endemic to New Zealand, placed within Southern Hemisphere family Gripopterygidae.

Zelandoperla species occur in high-gradient, stoney streams throughout New Zealand, where they feed predominantly on biofilms.

The currently recognised species are:

- Zelandoperla agnetis (McLellan 1967)
- Zelandoperla decorata (Tillyard 1923)
- Zelandoperla denticulata (McLellan 1967)
- Zelandoperla fenestrata (Tillyard 1923)
- Zelandoperla maungatuaensis (Foster, McCulloch & Waters 2019)

Two additional described species (Zelandoperla pennulata; Zelandoperla tillyardi) are now considered to be ecotypes of the polymorphic Z. fenestrata.
