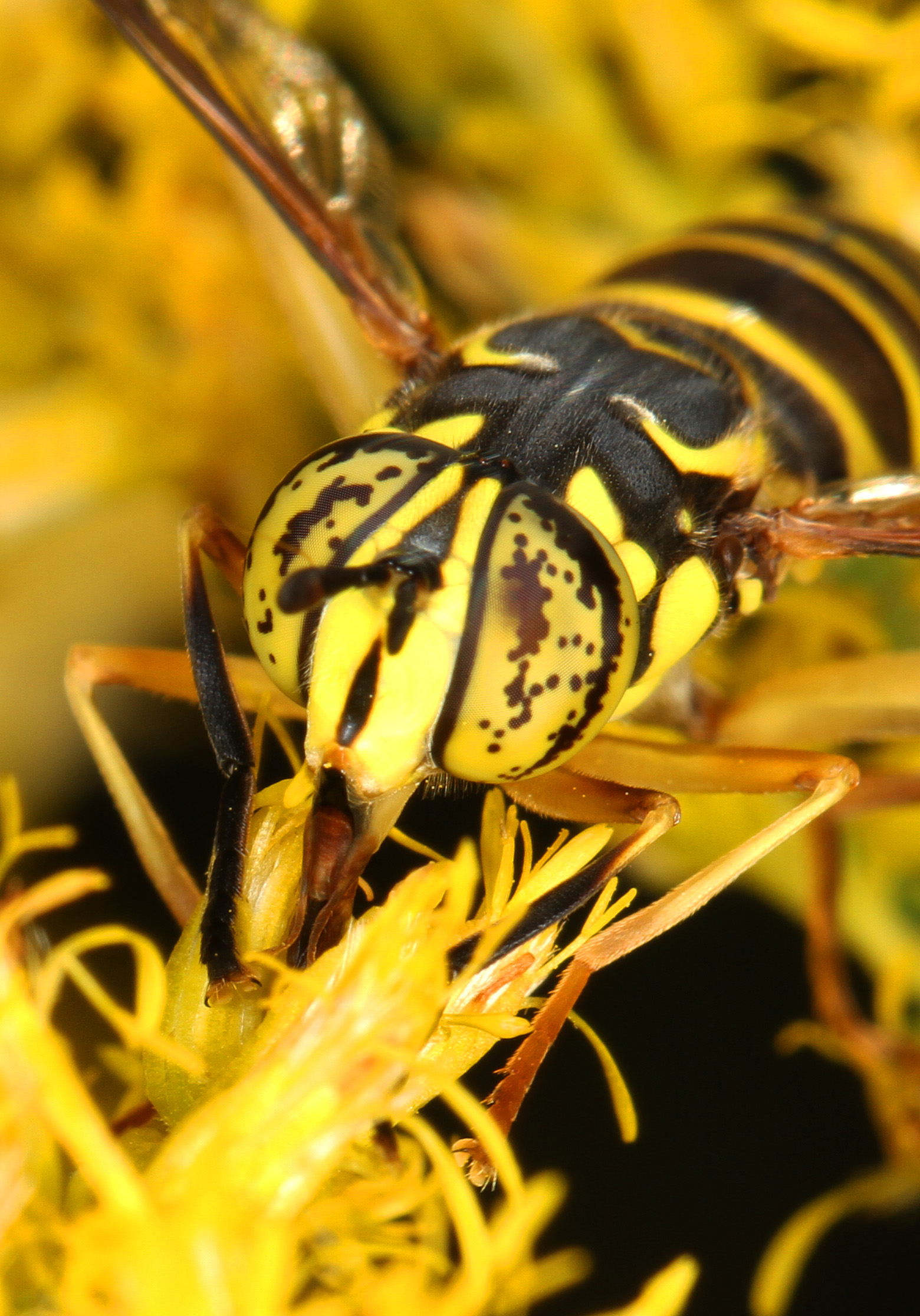

Scientific classification
- Kingdom: Animalia
- Phylum: Arthropoda
- Class: Insecta
- Order: Diptera
- Family: Syrphidae
- Subfamily: Eristalinae
- Tribe: Milesiini
- Subtribe: Milesiina
- Genus: Spilomyia
- Species: S. longicornis

Binomial name
- Spilomyia longicornis Loew, 1872

Synonyms
- Spilomyia banksi Nayar and Cole, 1968

= Spilomyia longicornis =

Species of fly

Spilomyia longicornis is a species of syrphid fly, also known as a flower fly or hoverfly, in the family Syrphidae. Although the appearance of S. longicornis is remarkably similar to a vespid wasp, it is a fly and cannot sting. It occurs in North America, east of the Rocky Mountains.

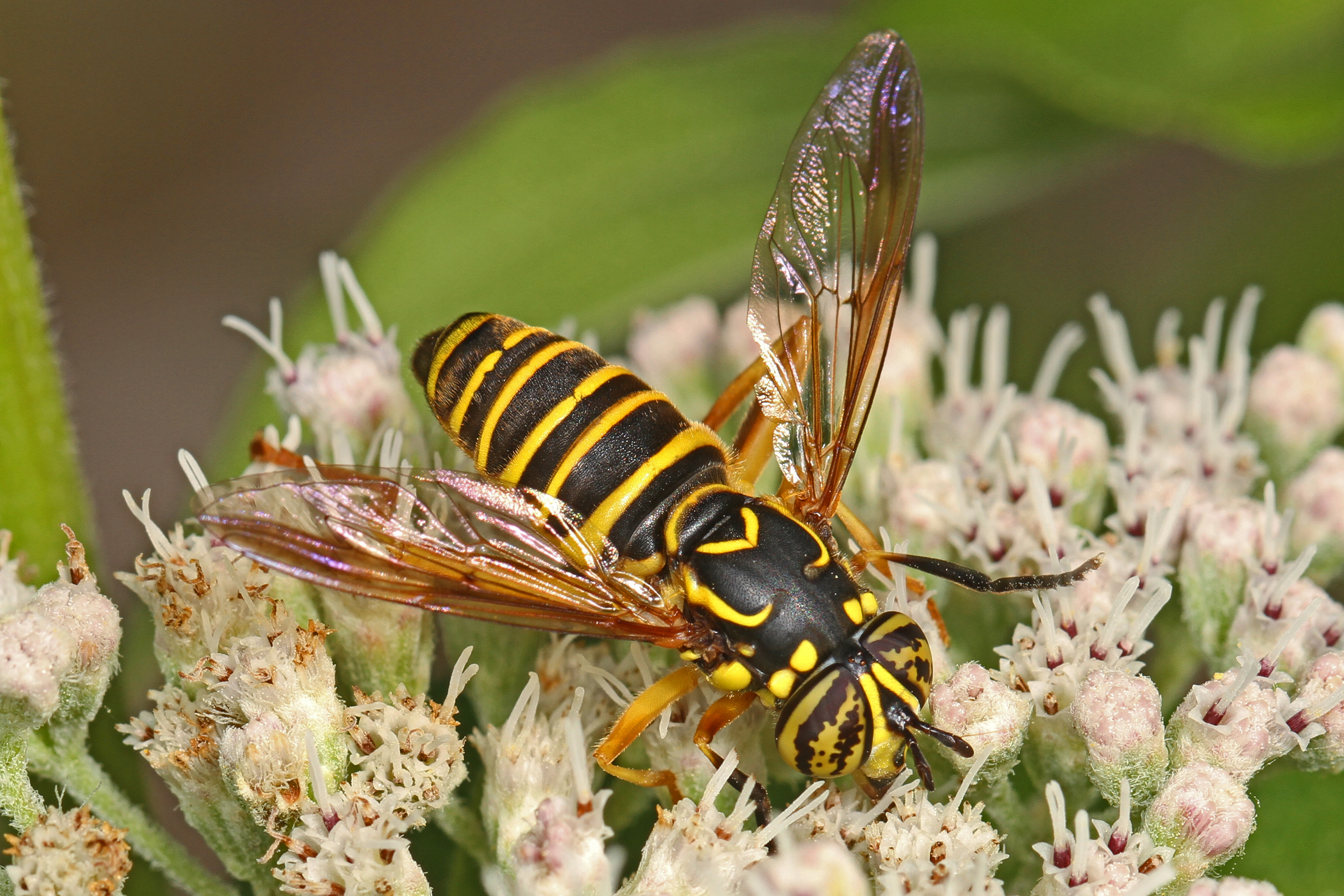
Spilomyia longicornis feeding on a flower

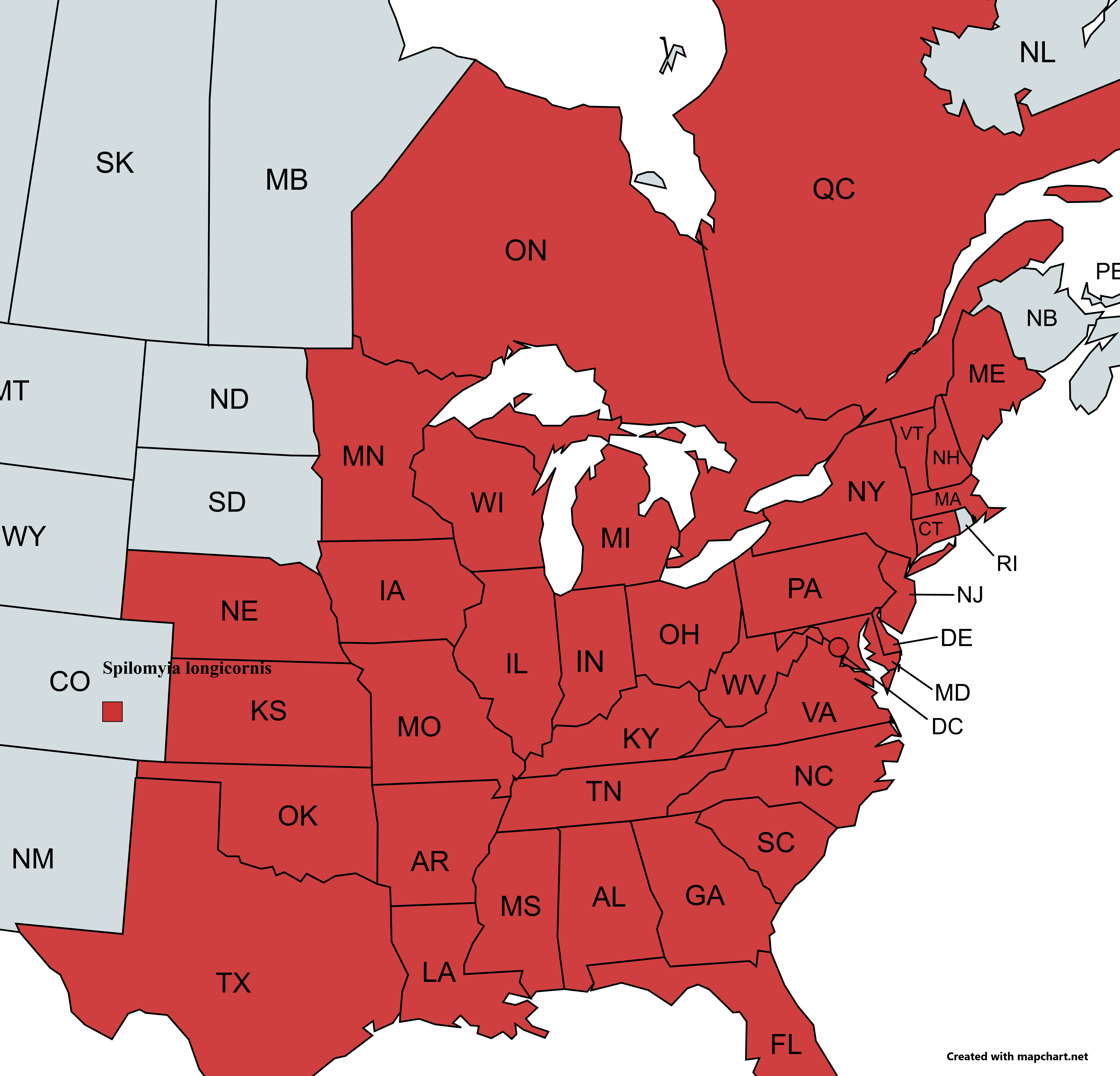
distribution map

== Description ==
S. longicornis is typically 11–15 millimeters long. S. longicornis has a black body with yellow markings and stripes on its abdomen. Its wings are mostly clear with a dark tinge, and the anterior portion of the wings are typically darker brown in colour. The back four legs are yellowish in colour, and the front two legs are yellow at the base and black at the ends. They tend to rest on their back four legs and move their front two legs above their head, making them appear like antennae on the Hymenoptera species that they mimic.

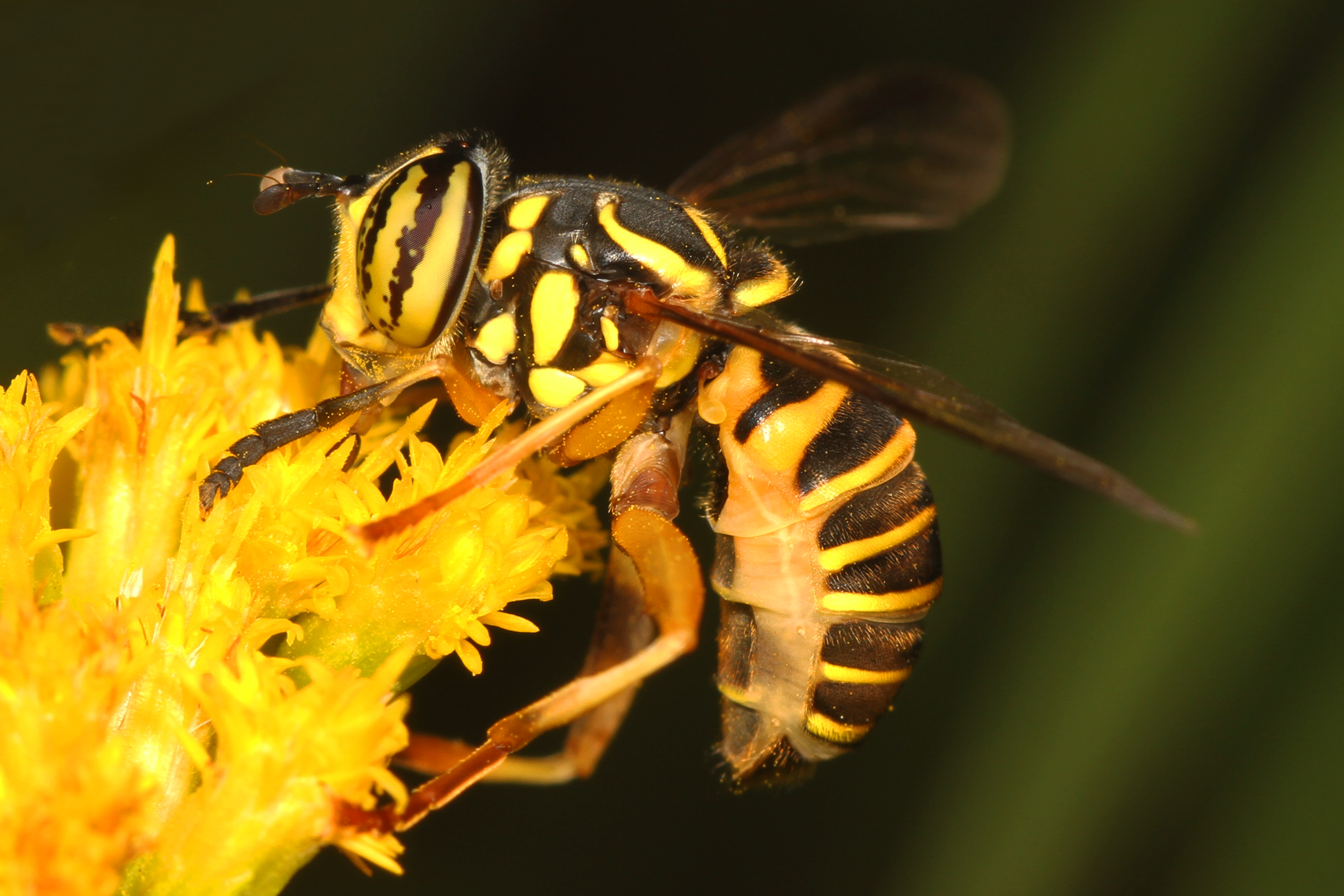
Spilomyia longicornis feeding on a flower

== Taxonomy ==
S. longicornis flies are part of the Syrphidae family, which is of the order Diptera. The hoverfly family is one of the most diverse in the Diptera order. There are at least 200 genera and 5000 species included in this family.

== Distribution and habitat ==
S. longicornis is widespread in eastern North America. These flies can be found near and around flowers that produce pollen and nectar, which they feed on. Also, rotting trees are an important environmental component of their habitat. S. longicornis larvae are typically found in rot holes, or rotting cavities found in live trees, and develop there. Almost all types of trees can develop rot holes, but they are more common for certain types of trees than others. The rot holes provide a food source and protection for the larvae. Thus, these damp environments are ideal for larval development. Adult S. longicornis flies are most often found hovering over flowers that produce large amounts of pollen and nectar, the adults' food source.

== Life history ==
S. longicornis larvae are found in rot holes in rotting trees., while adults spend the majority of their time around flowers to get pollen and nectar for food and for mating. Females need pollen for reproductive development.

Only adult S. longicornis flies eat the pollen and nectar from flowers. Pollen has a high content of nitrogenous nutrients. Because of this, females are able to use the nutrients from pollen to develop their reproductive tissues. These nutrients, which are not consumed by S. longicornis flies until adulthood, are important for vitellogenesis, also known as yolk deposition. They also consume nectar from flowers and use that energy for their hovering behavior.

== Mating ==
S. longicornis males have been directly observed mate-seeking near flowers.

== Mimicry ==
Most Syrphidae flies mimic Hymenoptera species. S. longicornis mimics vespid species including introduced species such as Vespula vulgaris. S. longicornis flies mimic vespid wasps in three main ways: physically, behaviorally, and auditorily. Just like vespid wasps, the anterior portion of the wings of S. longicornis flies are a darker brown color than the rest of the wing. Their abdomen is yellow with black stripes, and the thorax and head are similarly colored. Behaviorally, S. longicornis flies mimic the way common wasps move their antennae. By resting on their back four legs and placing and moving their two front black legs above their head, they more closely resemble wasps. When threatened, S. longicornis bend their abdomen in a similar fashion to wasps who are stinging a predator. They may also move their abdomen up and down when they are on a flower, which is a mimic of wasp abdomen expansion. Finally, it has been documented that S. longicornis flies, when threatened, produce a different buzzing sound than normal. While wasps do not necessarily produce a different sound upon attack, the sound S. longicornis makes when threatened seems to be of a frequency similar to some hymenopteran species. This strategy may have evolved because the visual and behavioral mimicry may not always work.
