= Ocular melanosis =

Dark coloration of the eye

- Other names: Ocular melanocytosis or Melanosis oculi or Nevus of Ota
- Specialty: Ophthalmology

Ocular melanosis (OM) is a blue-gray and/or brown lesion of the conjunctiva that can be separated into benign conjunctival epithelial melanosis (BCEM) and primary acquired melanosis (PAM), of which the latter is considered a risk factor for uveal melanoma. The disease is caused by an increase of melanocytes in the iris, choroid, and surrounding structures. Overproduction of pigment by these cells can block the trabecular meshwork through which fluid drains from the eye. The increased fluid in the eye leads to increased pressure, which can lead to glaucoma. In humans, this is sometimes known as pigment dispersion syndrome.

== Benign Conjunctival Epithelial Melanosis ==
BCEM, also referred to as conjunctival hypermelanosis, complexion-associated melanosis, or racial melanosis, is a non-cancerous lesion of the conjunctiva that is more commonly found in dark-skinned individuals (over 90% of lesions are found in black persons and around 5% in white persons). It is due to excess production of melanin in the setting of a normal number of melanocytes in the conjunctiva. It appears very early in life and the pattern does not seem to change upon reaching adulthood. There can be asymmetrical involvement of the eyes, and lesions are usually described as flat, brown, and patchy areas of pigmentation.

== Primary Acquired Melanosis ==
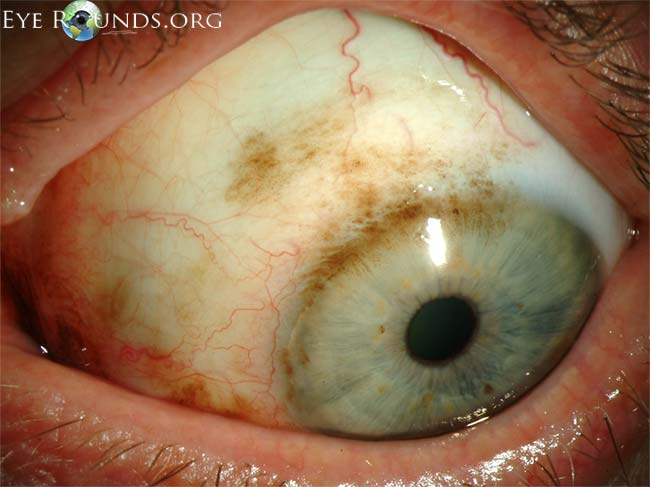
A light brown, patchy appearance of primary acquired melanosis (PAM).

PAM is a potentially cancerous lesion of the conjunctiva, which has a higher risk of transforming into a melanoma in white persons. Nearly 75% of all melanomas that arise from the conjunctiva have been found to have occurred in the setting of PAM. It is different from BCEM because there is a proliferation, or an increase in the number of melanocytes, which is attributed to greater risk of neoplasia formation. However, PAM may occur without atypia, which has no risk of malignant transformation, or with atypia. It is very important to determine at which age the lesion was first noticed because it is more likely to be a benign nevus, or mole, the earlier it is found. It may appear similar to BCEM since the lesion may also be flat, brown or blue-gray, and diffuse throughout the conjunctiva, but it is almost always only found on one eye.

=== Diagnosis ===
- Usually unilateral, flat, patchy, pigmented area that involves the limbus (the border of the cornea and sclera) and interpalpebral (between the eyelids) conjunctiva.
- Slit-lamp examination.
- Histopathological examination that shows intraepithelial proliferation of conjunctival epithelial melanocytes.
- Features that may encourage the ophthalmologist to biopsy the lesion include, but are not limited to:
  - Increasing size or size greater than 5mm
  - Involvement of conjunctiva underneath the eyelids
  - Nodular appearance
  - Appearance of blood vessels surrounding the patch
  - Previous history of melanoma

=== Treatment ===
There are a few management and treatment strategies for PAM. When lesions are small, they can be carefully watched on an annual basis. It is important to compare pictures year to year. However, for medium and large-sized lesions, we can consider surgery (excisional vs incisional biopsy), chemotherapy, or cryotherapy.

When a patient has PAM with atypia, an excisional biopsy with cryotherapy is recommended as the treatment. For some patients with diffuse lesions, surgery is not an option. In these cases, the recommendation is cryotherapy in combination with topical mitomycin C, which is a chemotherapeutic agent.
