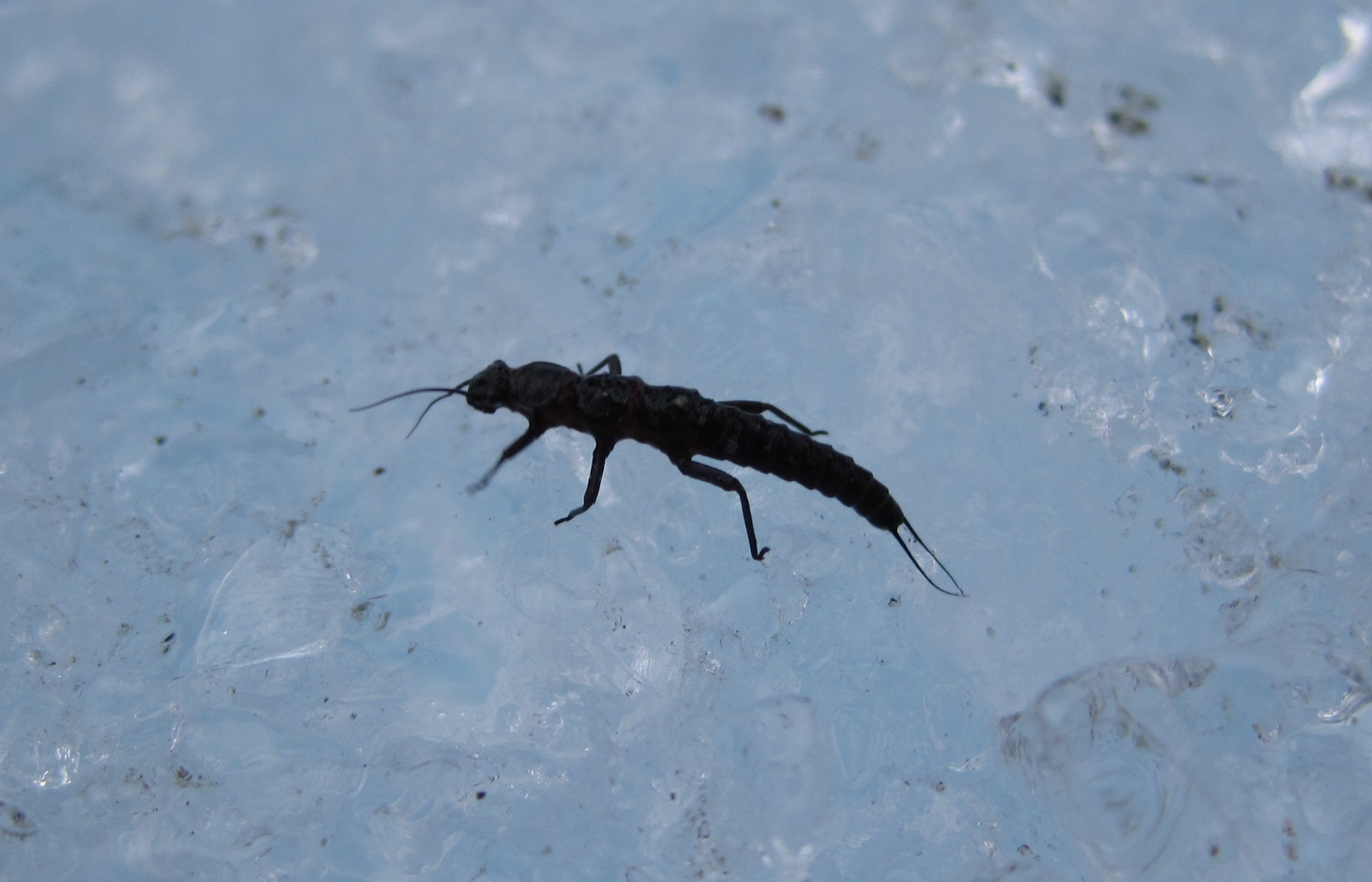
- Andiperla willinki

Scientific classification
- Kingdom: Animalia
- Phylum: Arthropoda
- Clade: Pancrustacea
- Class: Insecta
- Order: Plecoptera
- Suborder: Antarctoperlaria
- Superfamily: Gripopterygoidea
- Family: Gripopterygidae; Enderlein, 1909

= Gripopterygidae =

Gripopterygidae Temporal range: Tithonian–Recent

Family of stoneflies

Gripopterygidae is a family of stoneflies in the order Plecoptera. There are more than 50 genera and 320 described species in Gripopterygidae.

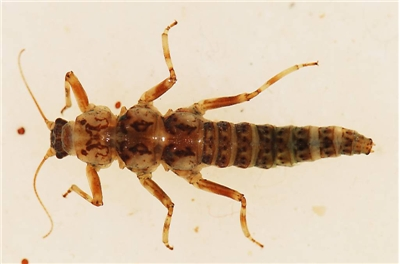
Rakiuraperla nudipes

== Genera ==
These 57 genera belong to the family Gripopterygidae:

- Acroperla McLellan, 1977
- Alfonsoperla McLellan & Zwick, 2007
- Andiperla Aubert, 1956
- Andiperlodes Illies, 1963
- Antarctoperla Enderlein, 1905
- Apteryoperla Wisely, 1953
- Araucanioperla Illies, 1963
- Aubertoperla Illies, 1963
- Aucklandobius Enderlein, 1909
- Cardioperla McLellan, 1971
- Ceratoperla Illies, 1963
- Chilenoperla Illies, 1963
- Claudioperla Illies, 1963
- Dinotoperla Tillyard, 1921
- Dundundra Theischinger, 1982
- Ericiataperla Vera Sanchez, 2016
- Eunotoperla Tillyard, 1924
- Falklandoperla McLellan, 2001
- Gripopteryx Pictet, 1841
- Guaranyperla Froehlich, 2001
- Holcoperla McLellan, 1977
- Illiesoperla McLellan, 1971
- Kirrama Theischinger, 1981
- Leptoperla Newman, 1839
- Limnoperla Illies, 1963
- Megaleptoperla Tillyard, 1923
- Megandiperla Illies, 1960
- Neboissoperla McLellan, 1971
- Neopentura Illies, 1965
- Nescioperla Theischinger, 1982
- Nesoperla Tillyard, 1923
- Newmanoperla McLellan, 1971
- Notoperla Enderlein, 1909
- Notoperlopsis Illies, 1963
- Nydyse Navás, 1933
- Odontoperla Mynott, Suter & Theischinger, 2017
- Oedemaperla Mynott, Suter & Theischinger, 2017
- Paragripopteryx Enderlein, 1909
- Pehuenioperla Vera Sanchez, 2009
- Pelurgoperla Illies, 1963
- Plegoperla Illies, 1963
- Potamoperla Illies, 1963
- Rakiuraperla McLellan, 1977
- Rhithroperla Illies, 1963
- Riekoperla McLellan, 1971
- Rungaperla McLellan, 1977
- Senzilloides Illies, 1963
- Taraperla McLellan, 1998
- Teutoperla Illies, 1963
- Trinotoperla Tillyard, 1924
- Tupiperla Froehlich, 1969
- Uncicauda McLellan & Zwick, 2007
- Vesicaperla McLellan, 1967
- Zelandobius Tillyard, 1921
- Zelandoperla Tillyard, 1923

=== Extinct genera ===
- † Cardioperlisca Sinitshenkova, 1992 Khaya Formation, Russia, Jurassic/Cretaceous boundary (Tithonian-Berriasian) Doronino Formation, Russia, Early Cretaceous (Barremian)
- † Eodinotoperla Jell & Duncan, 1986 Koonwarra Fossil Bed, Australia, Early Cretaceous (Aptian)
