= Mimicry =

Evolutionary strategy

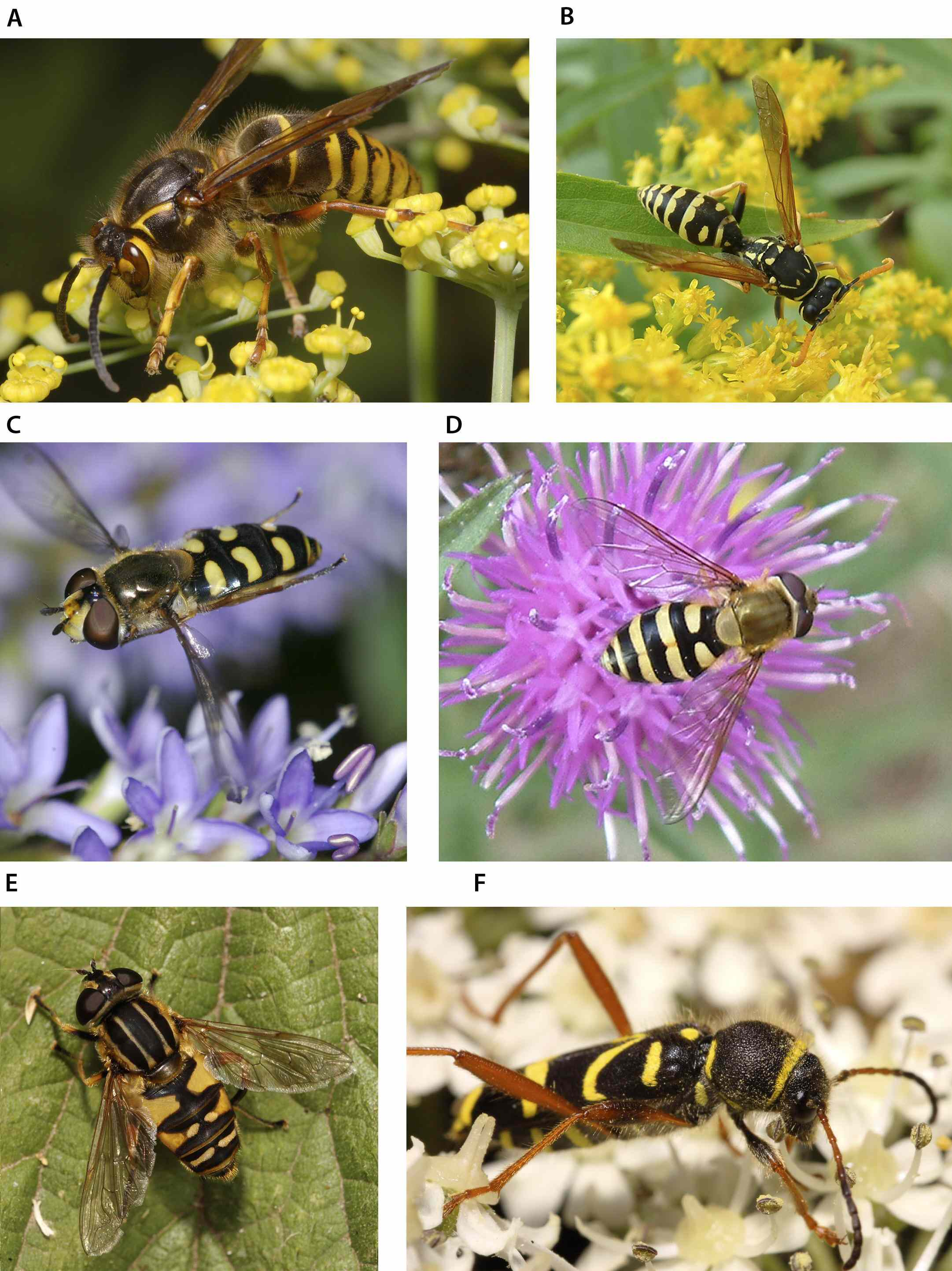
Many insects including hoverflies (C, D, E) and the wasp beetle (F) are Batesian mimics of stinging wasps (A, B), which are Müllerian mimics of each other.

In evolutionary biology, mimicry is the evolved resemblance of an organism to something else, often another organism of a different species. Mimicry may evolve between different species, or between individuals of the same species. In the simplest case, as in Batesian mimicry, a mimic resembles a model, so as to deceive a dupe, all three being of different species. A Batesian mimic, such as a hoverfly, is harmless, while its model, such as a wasp, is harmful, and is avoided by the dupe, such as an insect-eating bird. Birds hunt by sight, so the mimicry in that case is visual, but in other cases mimicry may make use of any of the senses. Most types of mimicry, including Batesian, are deceptive, as the mimics are not harmful, but Müllerian mimicry, where different harmful species resemble each other, is honest, as when species of wasps and of bees all have genuinely aposematic warning coloration. More complex types may be bipolar, involving only two species, such as when the model and the dupe are the same; this occurs for example in aggressive mimicry, where a predator in wolf-in-sheep's-clothing style resembles its prey, allowing it to hunt undetected. Mimicry is not limited to animals; in Pouyannian mimicry, an orchid flower is the mimic, resembling a female bee, its model; the dupe is the male bee of the same species, which tries to copulate with the flower, enabling it to transfer pollen, so the mimicry is again bipolar. In automimicry, another bipolar system, model and mimic are the same, as when blue lycaenid butterflies have 'tails' or eyespots on their wings that mimic their own heads, misdirecting predator dupes to strike harmlessly. Many other types of mimicry exist.

== Etymology ==
Use of the word mimicry dates to 1637. It derives from the Greek term mimetikos, "imitative", in turn from mimetos, the verbal adjective of mimeisthai, "to imitate". "Mimicry" was first used in zoology by the English entomologists William Kirby and William Spence in 1823. Originally used to describe people, "mimetic" was used in zoology from 1851.

== History ==
=== Ancient ===
Aristotle wrote in his History of Animals that partridges use a deceptive distraction display to lure predators away from their flightless young:

When a man comes by chance upon a young brood [of partridges], and tries to catch them, the hen-bird rolls in front of the hunter, pretending to be lame: the man every moment thinks he is on the point of catching her, and so she draws him on and on, until every one of her brood has had time to escape; hereupon she returns to the nest and calls the young back.

— Aristotle, translated by D'Arcy Wentworth Thompson

The behaviour is recognised as a form of mimicry by biologists.

=== 19th century ===
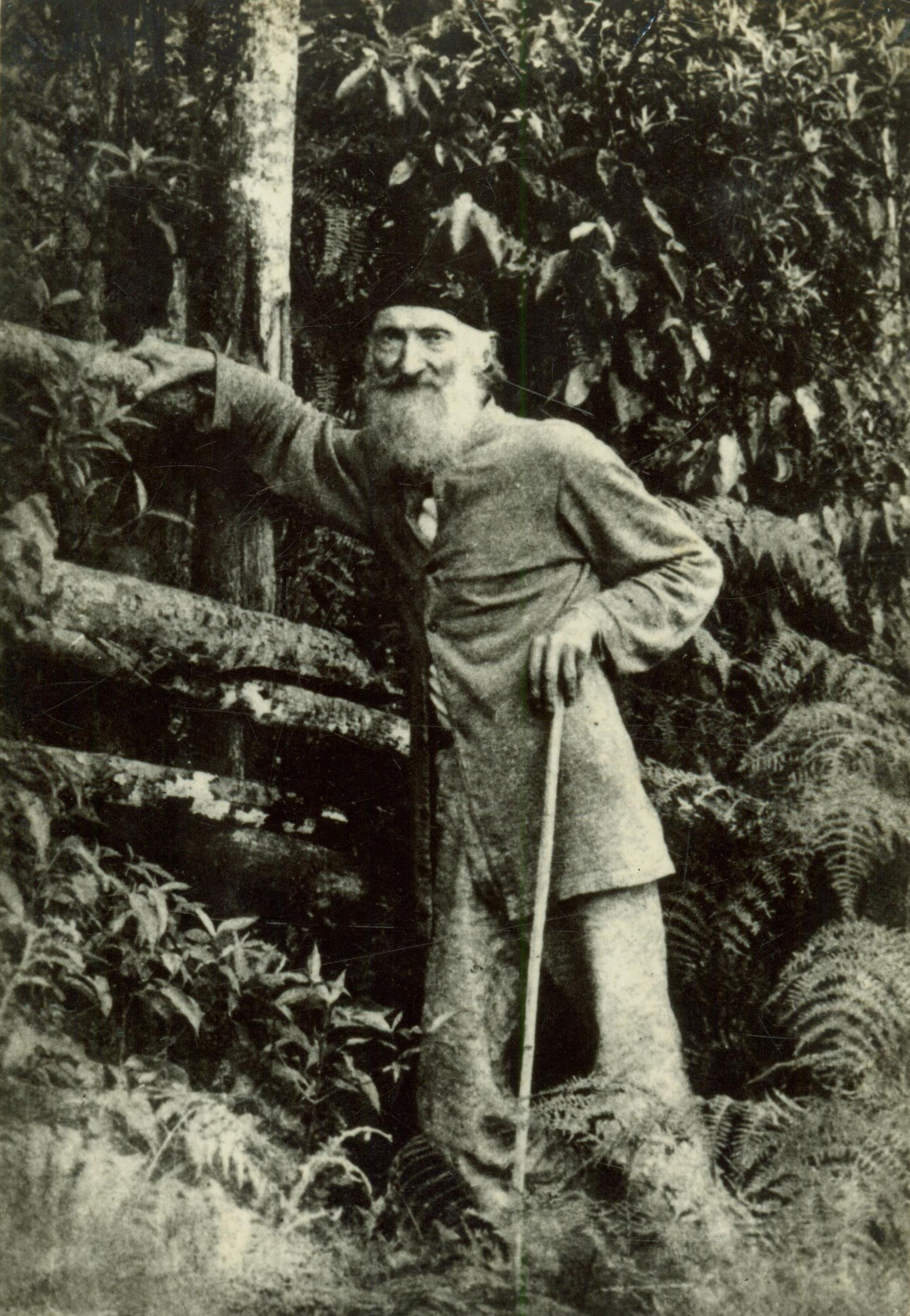
In 1879, Fritz Müller created the first mathematical model of mimicry to explain why distasteful species should evolve similar appearances.

In 1817, William Kirby and William Spence, in their book An Introduction to Entomology, used the term "mimicry" informally to depict the way that the structure and coloration of some insects resembled objects in their environments:

A jumping bug, very similar to the one figured by Schellenberg, also much resembles the lichens of the oak on which I took it. The spectre tribe (Phasma, Licht.) go still further in this mimicry, representing a small branch with its spray.

The English naturalist Henry Walter Bates worked for several years on butterflies in the Amazon rainforest. Returning home, he described multiple forms of mimicry in an 1862 paper at the Linnean Society in London, and then in his 1863 book The Naturalist on the River Amazons. The term "Batesian mimicry" has since been used in his honour, its usage becoming restricted to the situation in which a harmless mimic gains protection from its predators by resembling a distasteful model. Among the observations in Bates's 1862 paper is the statement:

I was never able to distinguish the Leptalides from the species they imitated, although they belong to a family totally different in structure and metamorphosis from the Heliconidae, without examining them closely after capture.

The German naturalist Fritz Müller also spent many years studying butterflies in the Amazon rainforest. He first published a journal article on mimicry in German in 1878, followed in 1879 by a paper to the Entomological Society of London (translated and presented by Ralph Meldola). He described a situation where different species were each unpalatable to predators, and shared similar, genuine, warning signals. Bates found it hard to explain why this should be so, asking why they should need to mimic each other if both were harmful and could warn off predators on their own. Müller put forward the first mathematical model of mimicry for this phenomenon: if a common predator confuses the two species, individuals in both those species are more likely to survive, as fewer individuals of either species are killed by the predator. The term Müllerian mimicry, named in his honour, has since been used for this mutualistic form of mimicry.

Müller wrote that

The resemblance of the genera named [Ituna and Thyridia] is the more worthy of notice since it occurs between insects both belonging to the group of butterflies which are protected by distastefulness. The explanation which applies in ordinary cases of [Batesian] mimicry—and no other has, so far as I know, been offered—cannot obtain for this imitation among protected species.

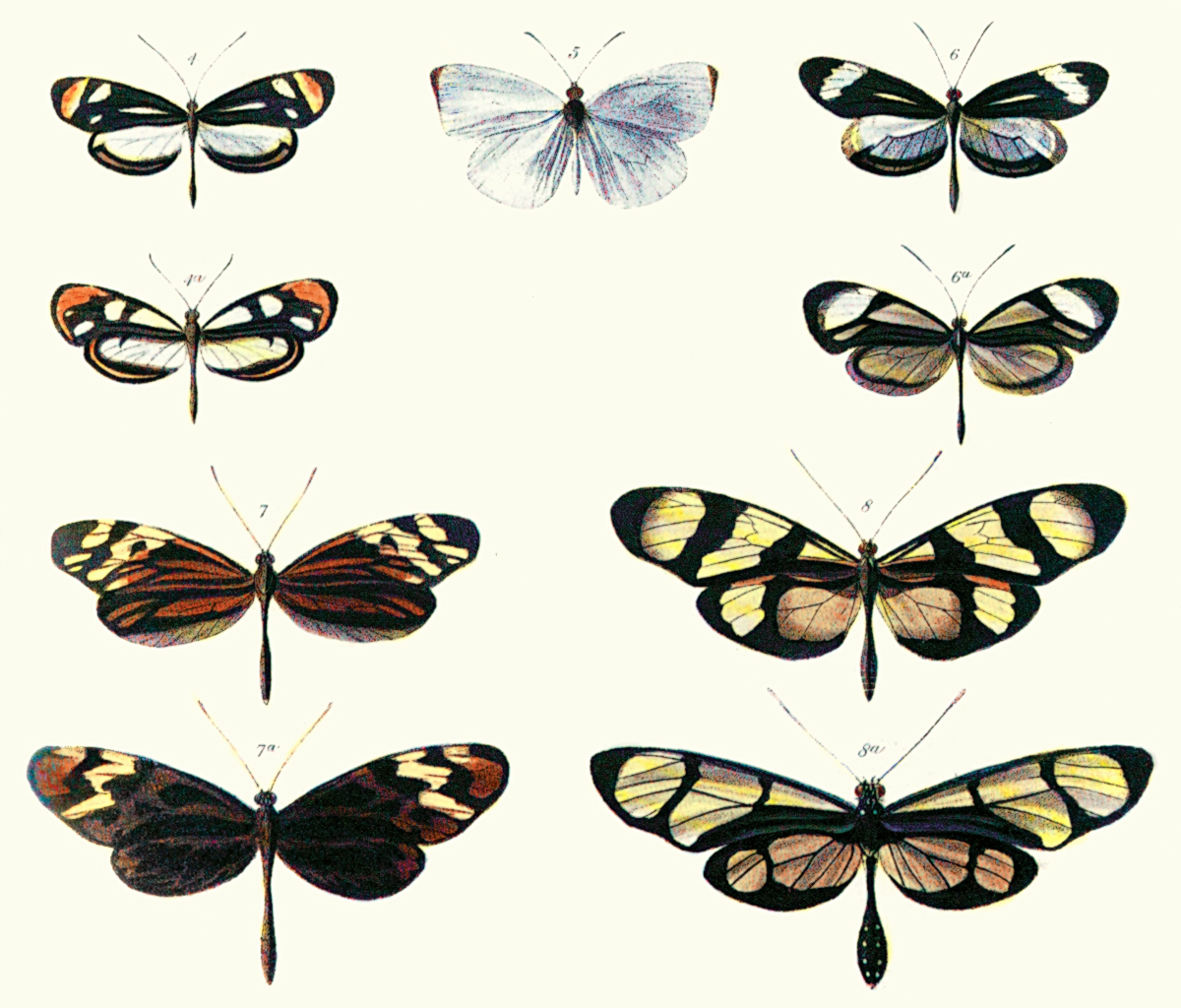
Plate from Henry Walter Bates's 1862 paper illustrating Batesian mimicry between harmless Dismorphia species (top and third row) and distasteful Ithomiini (Nymphalidae, second and bottom row).

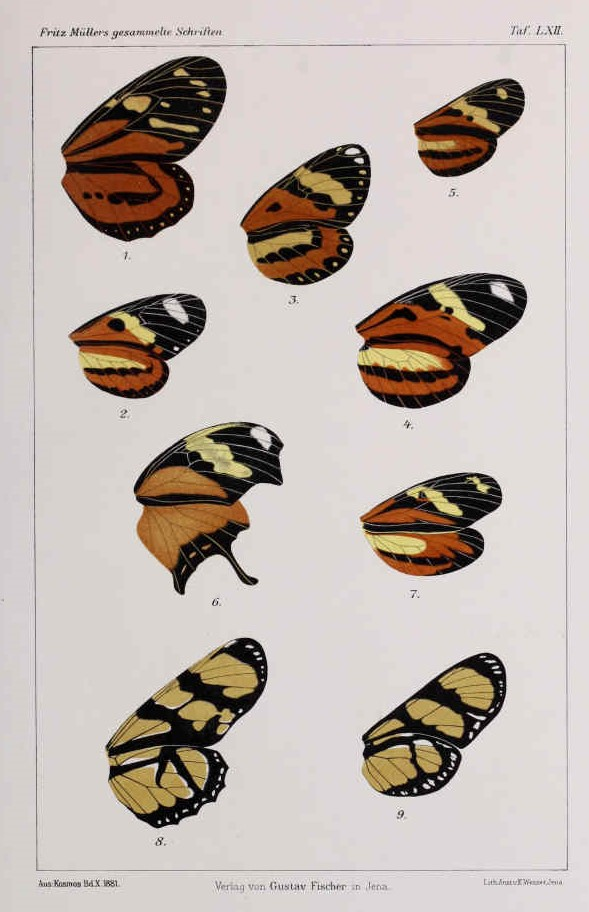
Mutual Müllerian mimicry in distasteful Heliconius butterflies. Plate LXII from Müller's collected writings, 1881

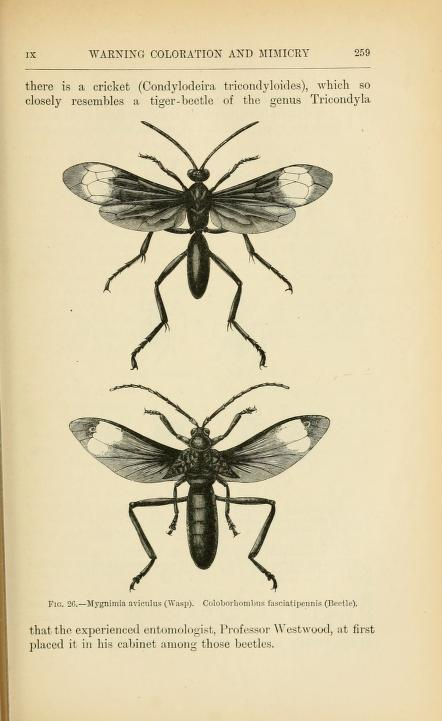
Page from Alfred Russel Wallace's 1889 book Darwinism, showing a beetle (below) mimicking a wasp

== Overview ==
=== Evolved resemblance ===
Batesian vs Müllerian mimicry: the former is deceptive, the latter honest.

Mimicry is an evolved resemblance between an organism and another object, often an organism of another species. Mimicry may evolve between different species, or between individuals of the same species. Often, mimicry functions to protect from predators. Mimicry systems have three basic roles: a mimic, a model, and a dupe. When these correspond to three separate species, the system is called disjunct; when the roles are taken by just two species, the system is called bipolar. Mimicry evolves if a dupe (such as a predator) perceives a mimic (such as a palatable prey) as a model (the organism it resembles), and is deceived to change its behaviour to the mimic's selective advantage. The resemblances can be via any sensory modality, including any combination of visual, acoustic, chemical, tactile, or electric. Mimicry may be to the advantage of both organisms that share a resemblance, in which case it is mutualistic; or it can be to the detriment of one, making it parasitic or competitive. The evolutionary convergence between groups is driven by the selective action of a dupe. Birds, for example, use sight to identify palatable insects, whilst avoiding noxious ones. Over time, palatable insects may evolve to resemble noxious ones, making them mimics and the noxious ones models. Models do not have to be more abundant than mimics. In the case of mutualism, each model is also a mimic; all such species can be called "co-mimics". Many harmless species such as hoverflies are Batesian mimics of strongly defended species such as wasps, while many such well-defended species form Müllerian mimicry rings of co-mimics. In the evolution of wasp-like appearance, it has been argued that insects evolve to masquerade wasps since predatory wasps do not attack each other, and that this mimetic resemblance has had the useful side-effect of deterring vertebrate predators.

Mimicry can result in an evolutionary arms race if mimicry negatively affects the model, in which case the model can evolve a different appearance from the mimic.^{p161} Mimics may have different models for different life cycle stages, or they may be polymorphic, with different individuals imitating different models, as occurs in Heliconius butterflies. Models tend to be relatively closely related to their mimics, but mimicry can be of vastly different species, for example when spiders mimic ants. Most known mimics are insects, though many other examples including vertebrates, plants, and fungi exist.

=== Crypsis ===
Crypsis, adaptation of an organism to avoid detection, has terminology and definitions that overlap mimicry. Crypsis may involve blending into an organism's environmental background while mimicry involves resembling another organism. Complications arise in cases like an insect which resembles a leaf, which is both another organism and part of the insect's background. For example, a katydid acts as a cryptic at a distance but up close it is a leaf mimic. Leaf mimicry in butterflies such as Kallima is a form of masquerade, protective resemblance.

=== Evolutionary explanations ===
It is widely accepted that mimicry evolves as a positive adaptation. The lepidopterist and novelist Vladimir Nabokov however argued that although natural selection might stabilize a "mimic" form, it would not be necessary to create it. The most widely accepted model used to explain the evolution of mimicry in butterflies is the two-step hypothesis. The first step involves mutation in modifier genes that regulate a complex cluster of linked genes that cause large changes in morphology. The second step consists of selections on genes with smaller phenotypic effects, creating an increasingly close resemblance. This model is supported by empirical evidence that suggests that a few single point mutations cause large phenotypic effects, while numerous others produce smaller effects. Some regulatory elements collaborate to form a supergene for the development of butterfly color patterns. The model is supported by computational simulations of population genetics. The Batesian mimicry in Papilio polytes is controlled by the doublesex gene.

Some mimicry is imperfect. Natural selection drives mimicry only far enough to deceive predators. For example, when predators avoid a mimic that imperfectly resembles a coral snake, the mimic is sufficiently protected.

Convergent evolution is an alternative explanation for why coral reef fish have come to resemble each other; the same applies to benthic marine invertebrates such as sponges and nudibranchs.

=== Living and non-living models ===
In its broadest definition, mimicry can include non-living models. The specific terms masquerade and mimesis are sometimes used when the models are inanimate, and the mimicry's purpose is crypsis. For example, animals such as flower mantises, planthoppers, comma and geometer moth caterpillars resemble twigs, bark, leaves, bird droppings or flowers. In addition, predators may make use of resemblance to harmless objects in aggressive masquerade, to enable them to approach prey. This wolf in sheep's clothing strategy differs from the more specific resemblance to the prey in aggressive mimicry, where the prey is both model and dupe.

Many animals bear eyespots, which are hypothesized to resemble the eyes of larger animals. They may not resemble any specific organism's eyes, and whether or not animals respond to them as eyes is also unclear. The model is usually another species, except in automimicry, where members of the species mimic other members, or other parts of their own bodies, and in inter-sexual mimicry, where members of one sex mimic members of the other.

== Types ==
Many types of mimicry have been described. An overview of each follows, highlighting the similarities and differences between the various forms. A typology of mimicry is often based on function with respect to the mimic (e.g., avoiding harm). Some cases may belong to more than one type, e.g., automimicry and aggressive mimicry are not mutually exclusive, as one describes the species relationship between model and mimic, while the other describes the function for the mimic (obtaining food). The terminology used has been debated, as typologies have differed or overlapped; attempts to clarify definitions have led to the partial replacement of old terms with new ones.

Types of mimicry proposed by G. Pasteur, 1982
Name	No. of spp.	Function	Dupe finds Model	Deception	Description (mimic, model, dupe)
Aristotelian	2	Protective	Agreeable	Deceptive	Brooding bird mimics itself with broken wing, luring predator away from nest
Automimicry	1 or 2	Protective	Agreeable	Deceptive	Multiple forms, e.g. one sex mimics the other, tail mimics head, etc.
Bakerian	2	Reproductive	Forbidding	Deceptive	Female flower resembles male flower, cheating pollinator
Batesian	3	Protective	Forbidding	Deceptive	Palatable mimic resembles distasteful model, deceives dupe
Browerian	2	Protective	Forbidding	Deceptive	Palatable butterfly resembles toxic member of same species
Emsleyan	3	Protective	Forbidding	Deceptive	Deadly snake resembles less deadly species, predators get chance to learn to avoid them
Gilbertian	2	Protective	Forbidding	Deceptive	Host/prey mimics and so repels parasite/predator
Kirbyan	2	Aggressive	Agreeable	Deceptive	Brood parasite adult or egg mimics host which raises the young as its own
Müllerian	3 or more	Protective	Forbidding	Honest	Distasteful co-mimics resemble each other, aposematically warning off predators
Pouyannian	2	Reproductive	Agreeable	Deceptive	Plant mimic resembles female bee, deceives male, gets itself pollinated
Vavilovian	3	Reproductive	Agreeable	Deceptive	Mimic resembles crop, deceives farmer
Wasmannian	2	Commensalist	Agreeable	Deceptive	Mimic resembles and deceives ant, lives in ant nest
Wicklerian	2	Aggressive	Agreeable	Deceptive	Predator or parasite resembles and attacks prey or host; parasite may get itself swallowed
Camouflage	2	Protective	Uninteresting	Deceptive	Mimic resembles background (plant parts, or inanimate)

== Defensive ==
Mimicry is defensive or protective when organisms are able to avoid harmful encounters by deceiving enemies into treating them as something else.

=== Batesian ===
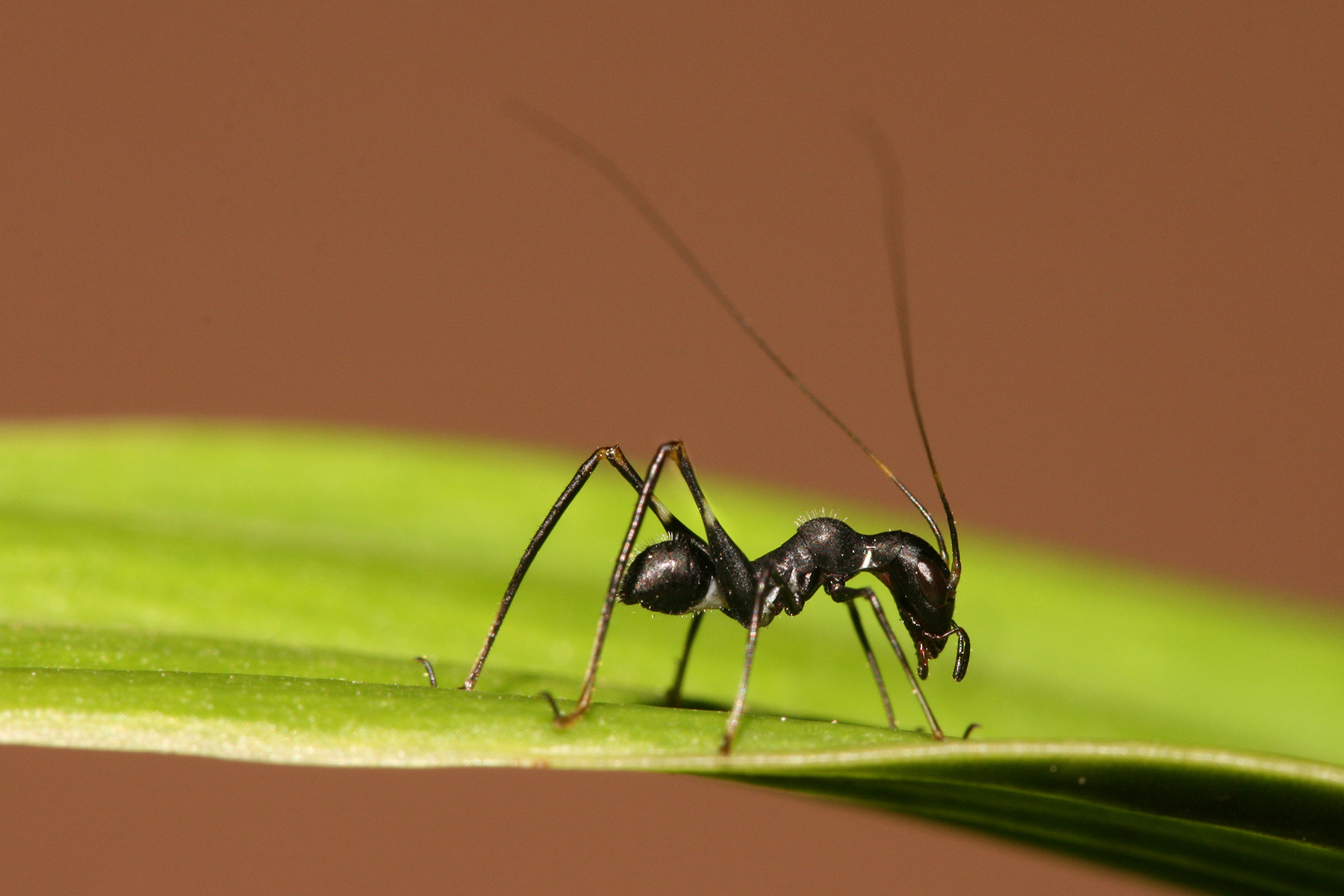
Macroxiphus, a harmless bush cricket, mimics a well-defended ant.

In Batesian mimicry, the mimic resembles the model, but does not have the attribute that makes it unprofitable to predators (e.g., unpalatability, or the ability to sting). In other words, a Batesian mimic is a sheep in wolf's clothing. Mimics are less likely to be found out (for example by predators) when in low proportion to their model. Such negative frequency-dependent selection applies in most forms of mimicry. Specifically, Batesian mimicry can only be maintained if the harm caused to the predator by eating a model outweighs the benefit of eating a mimic. The nature of learning is weighted in favor of the mimics, for a predator that has a bad first experience with a model tends to avoid anything that looks like it for a long time, and does not re-sample soon to see whether the initial experience was a false negative. However, if mimics become more abundant than models, then the probability of a young predator having a first experience with a mimic increases. Batesian systems are therefore most likely to be stable where the model is more abundant than the mimic.

There are many Batesian mimics among butterflies and moths. Consul fabius and Eresia eunice imitate unpalatable Heliconius butterflies such as H. ismenius. Limenitis arthemis imitate the poisonous pipevine swallowtail (Battus philenor). Several palatable moths produce ultrasonic click calls to mimic unpalatable tiger moths. Octopuses of the genus Thaumoctopus (the mimic octopus) are able to intentionally alter their body shape and coloration to resemble dangerous sea snakes or lionfish. In the Amazon, the helmeted woodpecker (Dryocopus galeatus), a rare species which lives in the Atlantic Forest of Brazil, Paraguay, and Argentina, has a similar red crest, black back, and barred underside to two larger woodpeckers: Dryocopus lineatus and Campephilus robustus. This mimicry reduces attacks on D. galeatus.

Batesian mimicry occurs in the plant kingdom, for example where the chameleon vine adapts its leaf shape and colour to match that of the plant it is climbing. The distasteful or defended aspects of the species that serves as the model which is being imitated are varied. For example, the model can be spiny; it may have chemical defences, mimicked by visual or olfactory cues; the mimic may smell of animal pheromones, faeces, or carrion.

=== Müllerian ===
Comparison of Batesian and Müllerian mimicry, illustrated with a hoverfly, a wasp and a bee

In Müllerian mimicry, two or more species have similar warning or aposematic signals and both share genuine anti-predation attributes (e.g. being unpalatable), as first described in Heliconius butterflies. This type of mimicry is unique in several respects. Firstly, both the mimic and the model benefit from the interaction, which could thus be classified as mutualism. The signal receiver also benefits by this system, despite being deceived about species identity, as it is able to generalize the pattern to potentially harmful encounters. The distinction between mimic and model that is clear in Batesian mimicry is also blurred. Where one species is scarce and another abundant, the rare species can be said to be the mimic. When both are present in similar numbers, however, it makes more sense to speak of each as a co-mimic than of distinct 'mimic' and 'model' species, as their warning signals tend to converge. Also, the mimetic species may exist on a continuum from harmless to highly noxious, so Batesian mimicry grades smoothly into Müllerian convergence.

=== Emsleyan/Mertensian ===
Emsleyan or Mertensian mimicry describes the unusual case where a deadly prey mimics a less dangerous species. It was first proposed by M. G. Emsley in 1966 as a possible explanation for how a predator can learn to avoid a very dangerous aposematic animal, such as a coral snake, when the predator is very likely to die, making learning unlikely. The theory was developed by the German biologist Wolfgang Wickler who named it after the German herpetologist Robert Mertens. The scenario is unlike Müllerian mimicry, where the most harmful species is the model. But if a predator dies on its first encounter with a deadly snake, it has no occasion to learn to recognize the snake's warning signals. There would then be no advantage for an extremely deadly snake in being aposematic: any predator that attacked it would be killed before it could learn to avoid the deadly prey, so the snake would be better off being camouflaged to avoid attacks. But if the predator first learnt to avoid a less deadly warning-coloured snake, the deadly species could profit by mimicking the less dangerous snake. Some harmless milk snakes (Lampropeltis triangulum), the moderately toxic false coral snakes (Erythrolamprus aesculapii), and the deadly coral snakes (Micrurus) all have a red background color with black and white/yellow rings. In this system, both the milk snakes and the deadly coral snakes are mimics, while the false coral snakes are the model.

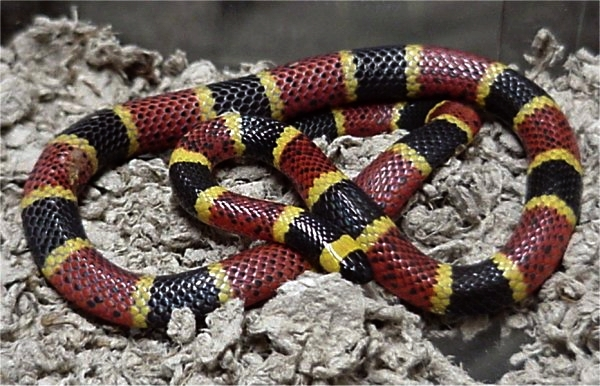
The deadly Texas coral snake,
Micrurus tener,
(the Emsleyan/Mertensian mimic)

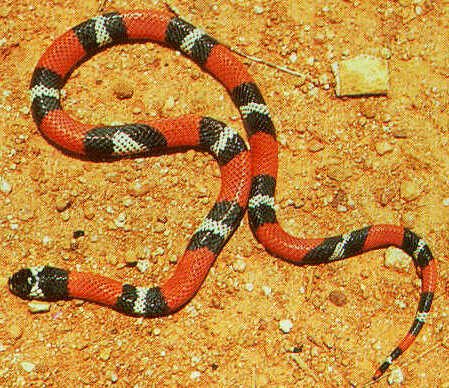
The moderately toxic
Erythrolamprus aesculapii
(the model for both types of mimicry)

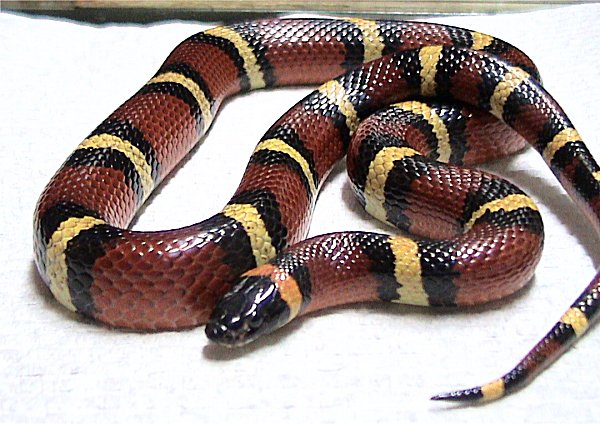
The harmless Mexican milk snake,
Lampropeltis triangulum annulata
(the Batesian mimic)

=== Wasmannian ===
In Wasmannian mimicry, the mimic resembles a model that it lives along with in a nest or colony. Most of the models here are eusocial insects, principally ants.

=== Gilbertian ===
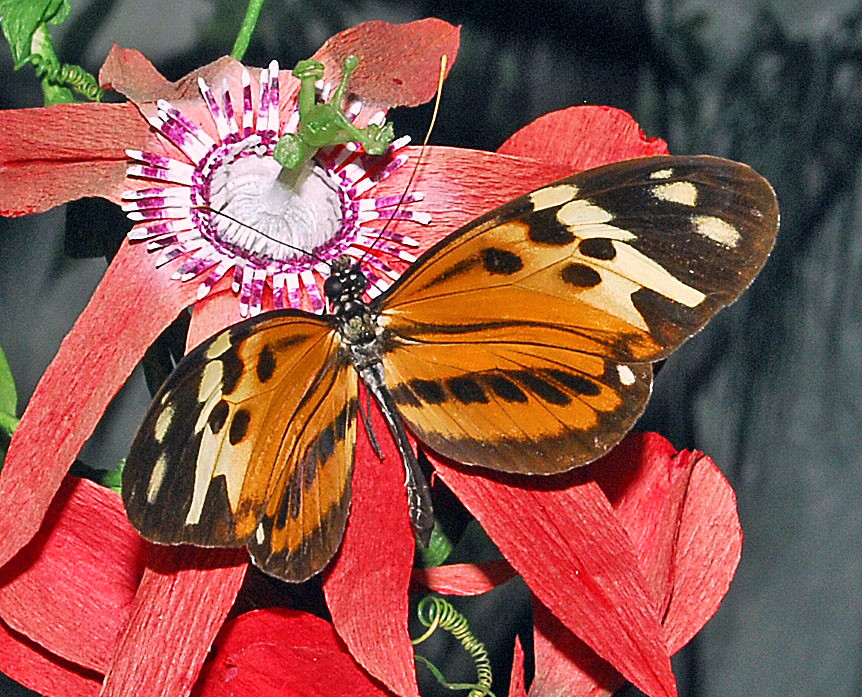
Some Passiflora flower species use Gilbertian mimicry, defending against being eaten by larvae of Heliconius butterflies with leaf stipules (not shown) that resemble the butterfly's eggs.

Gilbertian mimicry is bipolar, involving only two species. The potential host (or prey) drives away its parasite (or predator) by mimicking it, the reverse of host-parasite aggressive mimicry. It was coined by Pasteur as a phrase for such rare mimicry systems, and is named after the American ecologist Lawrence E. Gilbert who described it in 1975. The classical instance of Gilbertian mimicry is in the plant genus Passiflora, which is grazed by the micropredator larvae of some Heliconius butterflies. The host plants have evolved stipules that mimic mature Heliconius eggs near the point of hatching. The butterflies avoid laying eggs near existing ones, reducing intraspecific competition between caterpillars, which are also cannibalistic, so those that lay on vacant leaves provide their offspring with a greater chance of survival. The stipules thus appear to have evolved as Gilbertian mimics of butterfly eggs, under selection pressure from these caterpillars.

=== Browerian ===
Browerian mimicry, named after Lincoln P. Brower and Jane Van Zandt Brower who first described it in 1967, is a postulated form of automimicry; where the model belongs to the same species as the mimic. This is the analogue of Batesian mimicry within a single species, and occurs when there is a palatability spectrum within a population. Examples include the monarch and the queen from the subfamily Danainae, which feed on milkweed species of varying toxicity. These species store toxins from its host plant, which are maintained even in the adult. As levels of toxin vary depending on diet, some individuals are more toxic than the rest, which profit from the toxicity of those individuals, just as hoverflies benefit from mimicking well-defended wasps.

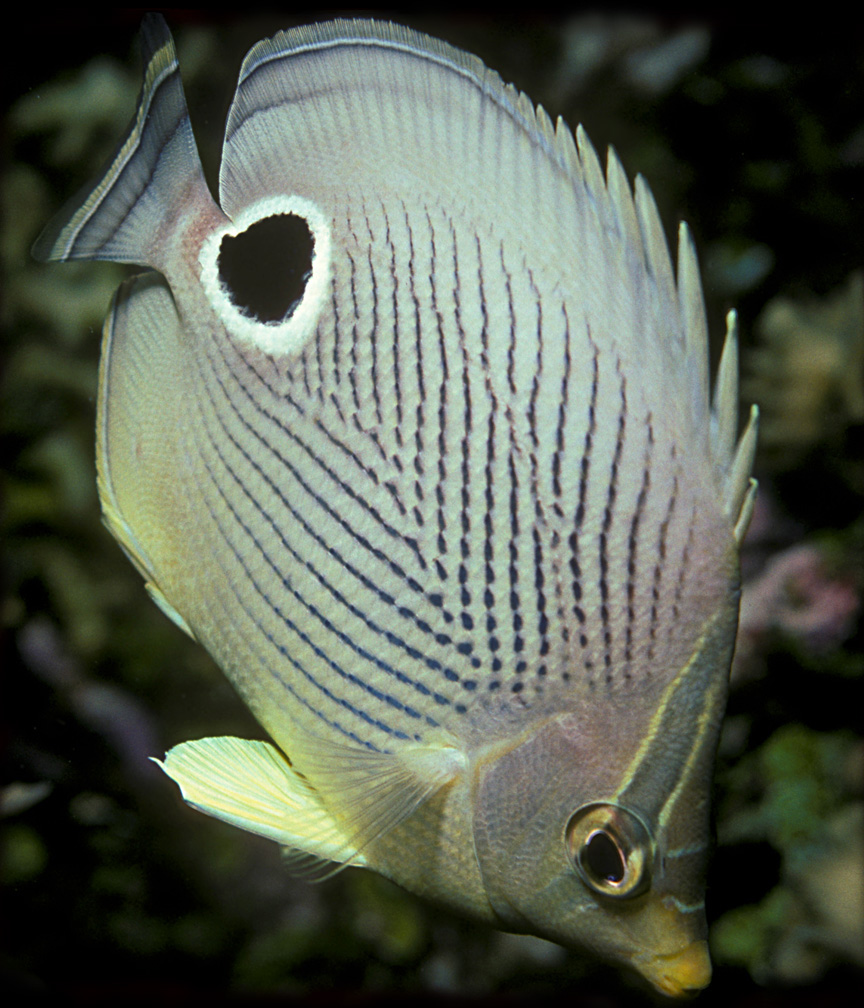
Eyespots of foureye butterflyfish (Chaetodon capistratus) mimic its own eyes, deflecting attacks from the vulnerable head.

One form of automimicry is where one part of an organism's body resembles another part. For example, the tails of some snakes resemble their heads; they move backwards when threatened and present the predator with the tail, improving their chances of escape without fatal harm. Some fishes have eyespots near their tails, and when mildly alarmed swim slowly backwards, presenting the tail as a head. Some insects such as some lycaenid butterflies have tail patterns and appendages of various degrees of sophistication that promote attacks at the rear rather than at the head. Several species of pygmy owl bear "false eyes" on the back of the head, misleading predators into reacting as though they were the subject of an aggressive stare. Many insects have filamentous "tails" at the ends of their wings and patterns of markings on the wings themselves. These combine to create a "false head". This misdirects predators such as birds and jumping spiders. Spectacular examples occur in the hairstreak butterflies; when perching on a twig or flower, they commonly do so upside down and shift their rear wings repeatedly, causing antenna-like movements of the "tails" on their wings. Studies of rear-wing damage support the hypothesis that this strategy is effective in deflecting attacks from the insect's head.

== Aggressive ==
=== Predators ===
Aggressive mimicry is found in predators or parasites that share some of the characteristics of a harmless species, allowing them to avoid detection by their prey or host. The strategy has been described by multiple zoologists as like the proverbial wolf in sheep's clothing, though no conscious deceptive intent is involved. The mimic may resemble the prey or host itself, or another organism that does not threaten the prey or host.

Several spiders use aggressive mimicry to lure prey. Species such as the silver argiope (Argiope argentata) employ prominent patterns in the middle of their webs, such as zigzags. These may reflect ultraviolet light, and mimic the pattern seen in many flowers known as nectar guides. Spiders change their web day to day, which can be explained by the ability of bees to remember web patterns.

Another case is where males are lured towards what seems to be a sexually receptive female. The model in this situation is the same species as the dupe. Female fireflies of the genus Photuris emit light signals that mimic the mating signals of females of the genus Photinus. Male fireflies from several different genera are attracted to these "femmes fatales", and are captured and eaten. Each female has a repertoire of signals matching the delay and duration of the flashes of the female of the corresponding species.

Some carnivorous plants may be able to increase their rate of capturing insect prey through mimicry.

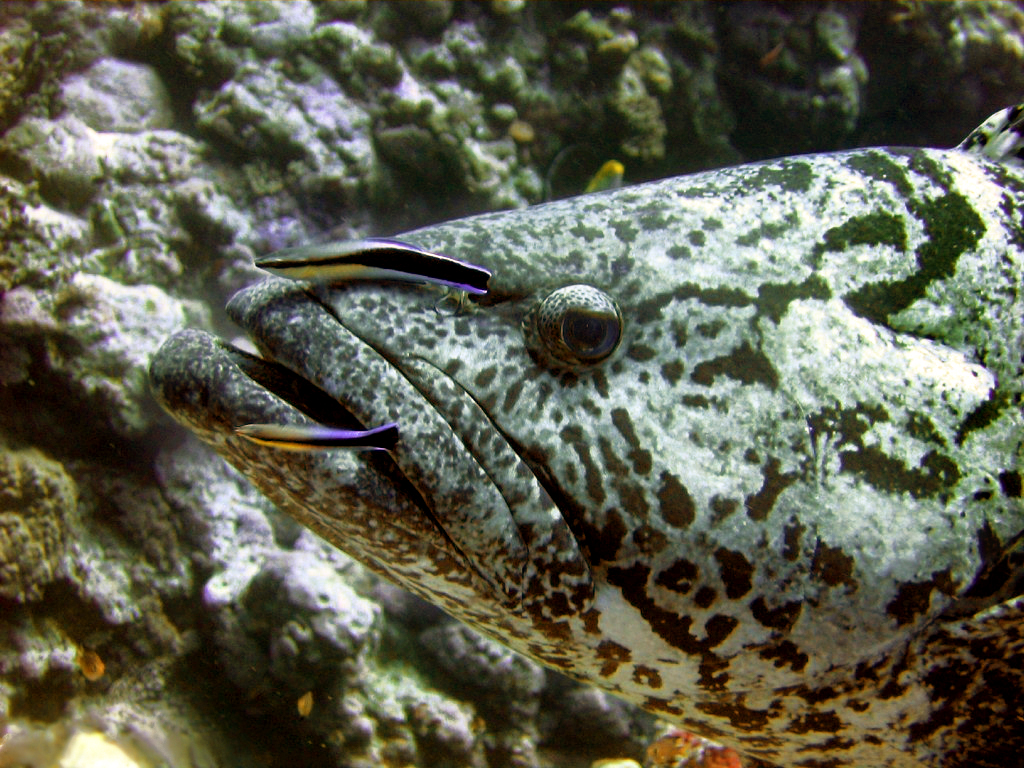
Two bluestreak cleaner wrasse cleaning a potato grouper, Epinephelus tukula

A different aggressive strategy is to mimic a mutualistic symbiont of the prey. Cleaner fish eat parasites and dead skin from client fish. Some allow the cleaner to venture inside their body to hunt these parasites. However, the sabre-toothed blenny or false cleanerfish (Aspidontus taeniatus) mimics the bluestreak cleaner wrasse (Labroides dimidiatus), which is recognized by other fishes as a cleaner. The false cleanerfish resembles the cleaner, and mimics the cleaner's "dance". Once it is allowed close to the client, it attacks, biting off a piece of its fin before fleeing. Fish wounded in this fashion soon learn to distinguish mimic from model, but because the similarity is close they also become much more cautious of the model.

A mechanism that does not involve any luring is seen in the zone-tailed hawk, which resembles the turkey vulture. It flies amongst the vultures, effectively camouflaged as a vulture which poses no threat to the hawk's prey. It hunts by suddenly breaking from the formation and ambushing its prey.

=== Parasites ===
Parasites can be aggressive mimics, though the situation is somewhat different from those outlined previously. They can mimic their hosts' natural prey, allowing themselves to be eaten as a pathway into their host. Leucochloridium, a genus of flatworm, matures in the digestive system of songbirds, their eggs then passing out of the bird in the faeces. They are then taken up by Succinea, a terrestrial snail. The eggs develop in this intermediate host, and must then find a suitable bird to mature in. Since the host birds do not eat snails, the sporocyst has another strategy to reach its host's intestine. They are brightly coloured and move in a pulsating fashion. A sporocyst-sac pulsates in the snail's eye stalks, coming to resemble an irresistible meal for a songbird. In this way, it can bridge the gap between hosts, allowing it to complete its life cycle. A nematode (Myrmeconema neotropicum) changes the colour of the abdomen of workers of the canopy ant Cephalotes atratus to make it appear like the ripe fruits of Hyeronima alchorneoides. It also changes the behaviour of the ant so that the gaster (rear part) is held raised. This presumably increases the chances of the ant being eaten by birds.

== Reproductive ==
Reproductive mimicry occurs when the actions of the dupe directly aid in the mimic's reproduction. This is common in plants with deceptive flowers that do not provide the reward they seem to offer and it may occur in Papua New Guinea fireflies, in which the signal of Pteroptyx effulgens is used by P. tarsalis to form aggregations to attract females. Other forms of mimicry have a reproductive component, such as Vavilovian mimicry involving seeds, vocal mimicry in birds, and aggressive and Batesian mimicry in brood parasite-host systems.

=== Bakerian and Dodsonian ===
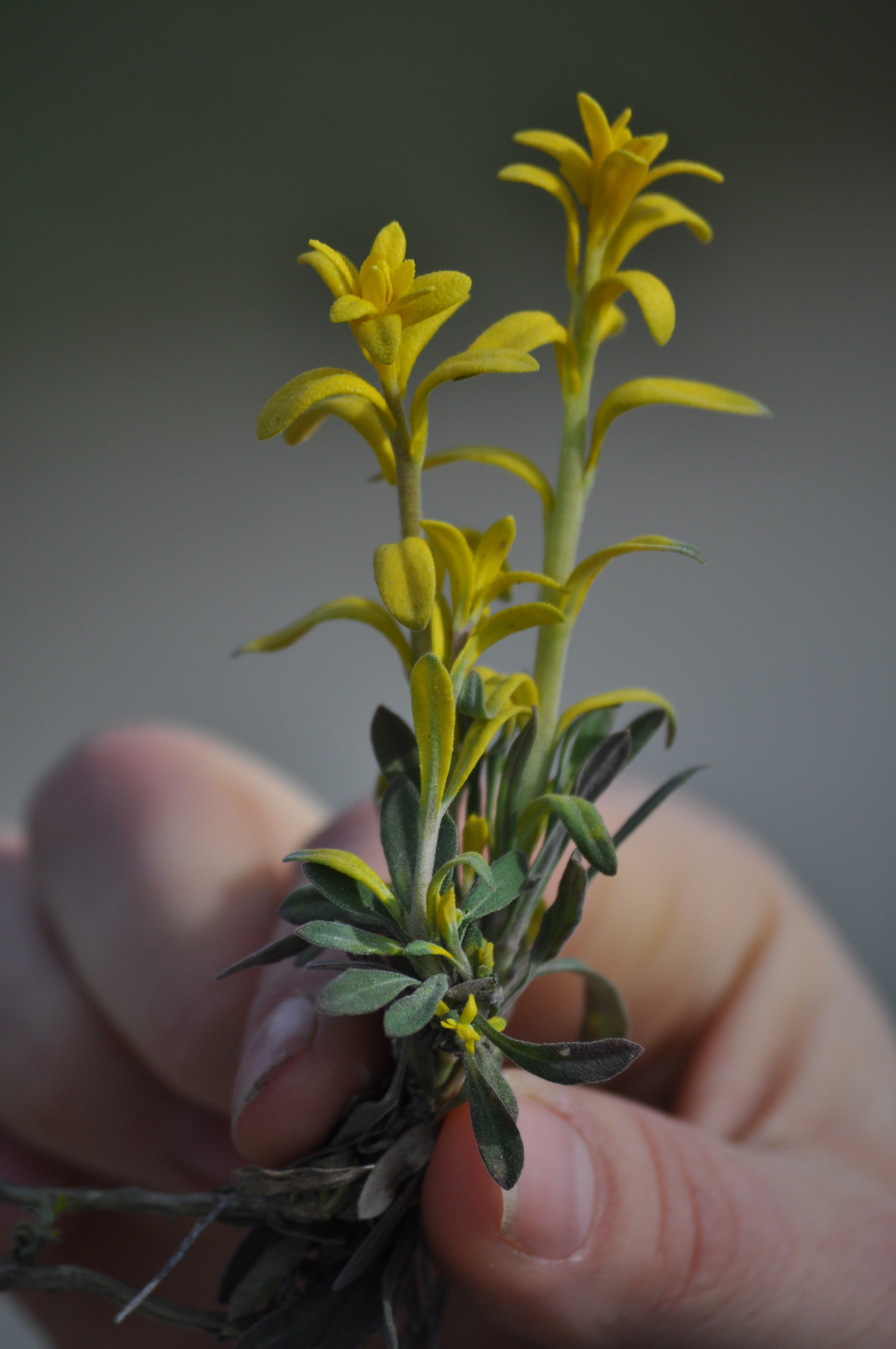
Pseudoflower created by Puccinia fungus on Arabis plant. Its mimicry deceives pollinating insects, which distribute the fungus's propagules (spermatia).

Bakerian mimicry, named after Herbert G. Baker, is a form of automimicry where female flowers mimic male flowers of their own species, cheating pollinators out of a reward. This reproductive mimicry may not be readily apparent as members of the same species may still exhibit some degree of sexual dimorphism. It is common in many species of Caricaceae.

In Dodsonian mimicry, named after Calaway H. Dodson, the model belongs to a different species than the mimic. By resembling the model, a flower can lure its pollinators without offering nectar. The mechanism occurs in several orchids, including Epidendrum ibaguense which mimics flowers of Lantana camara and Asclepias curassavica, and is pollinated by monarch butterflies and perhaps hummingbirds.

A somewhat similar mechanism operates with the pseudoflowers created by fungi such as the parasitic rust Puccinia monoica. When this infects a host plant in the Brassicaceae (the cabbage family), it inhibits the plant's production of flowers. Instead, it causes the plant to produce structures of bright yellow leaves that mimic flowers, including their scent, but that offer no floral rewards to pollinating insects. The structures carry the fungus's spermatogonia, which produce spermatia. The duped insects then carry the spermatia to other host plants. Another fungus, Fusarium xyrophilum forms pseudoflowers by infecting yellow-eyed grass, Xyris.

=== Kirbyan mimicry, brood parasitism ===
Brood parasitism or Kirbyan mimicry is a two species system where a brood parasite mimics its host. Cuckoos are a canonical example; the female cuckoo has its offspring raised by a bird of a different species, cutting down the biological mother's parental investment. The key adaptation is the ability to lay eggs that closely mimic the color and shape of the host's eggs. The adaptation to different hosts is inherited through the female line in so-called gentes (gens, singular), and this mimicry capacity is believed to be maternally inherited. Intraspecific brood parasitism, where a female lays in a conspecific's nest, as illustrated by the goldeneye duck (Bucephala clangula), do not involve mimicry The parasitic butterfly Phengaris rebeli parasitizes the ant species Myrmica schencki by releasing chemicals that fool the worker ants to believe that the caterpillar larvae are ant larvae. This enables the larvae to be brought directly into the ant's nest.

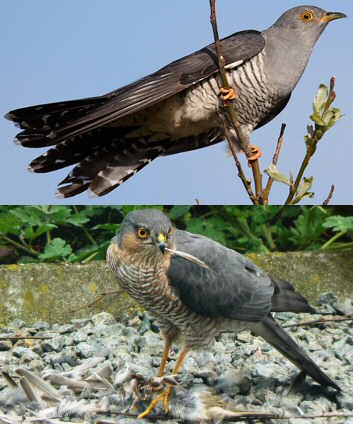
Mimicry in a brood parasite: Cuckoo mimics sparrowhawk, alarming small birds enough to give time to lay eggs.

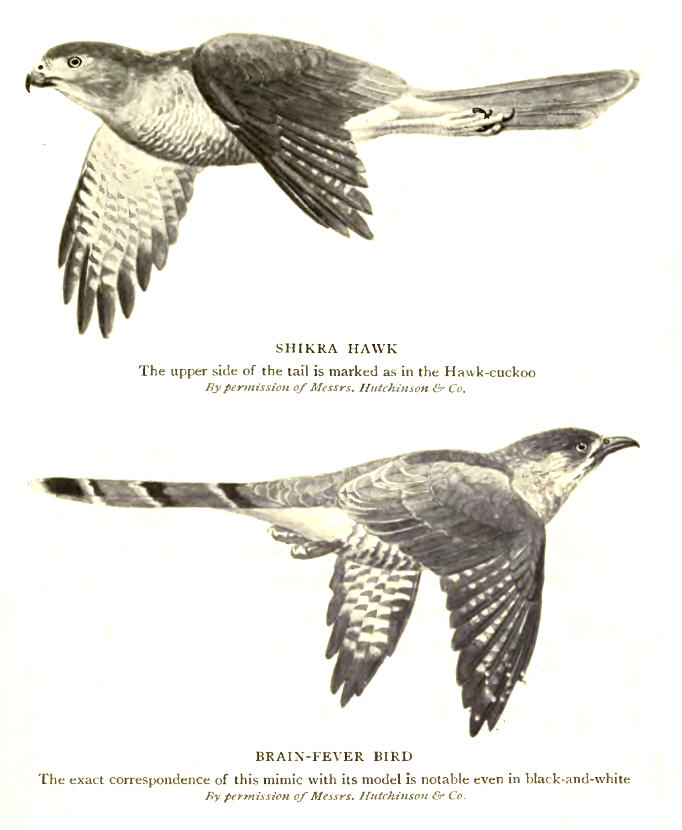
Common hawk-cuckoo resembles a predator, the shikra.

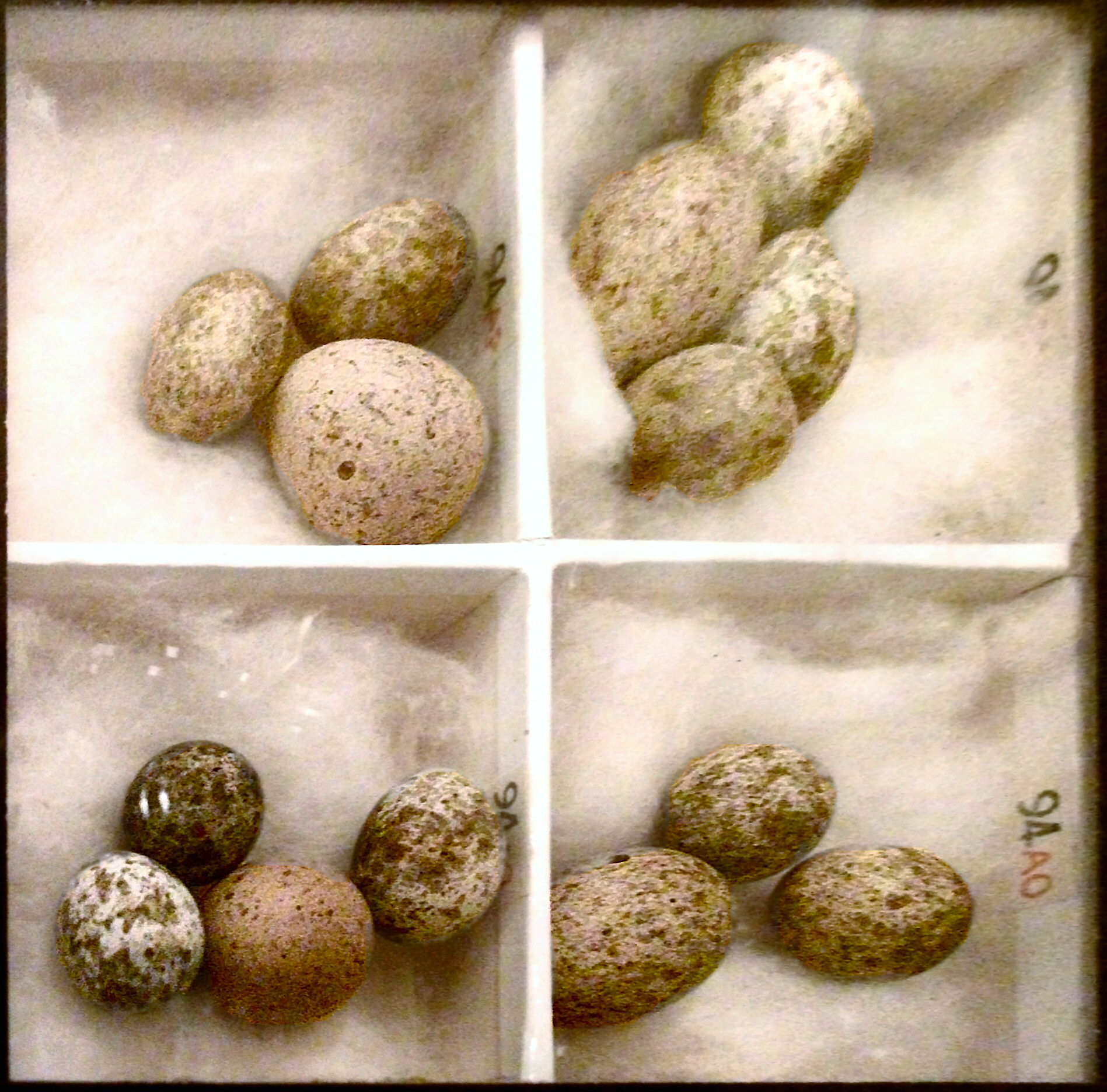
Egg mimicry: cuckoo eggs (larger) mimic many species of host birds' eggs, in this case of reed warbler.

=== Pouyannian ===
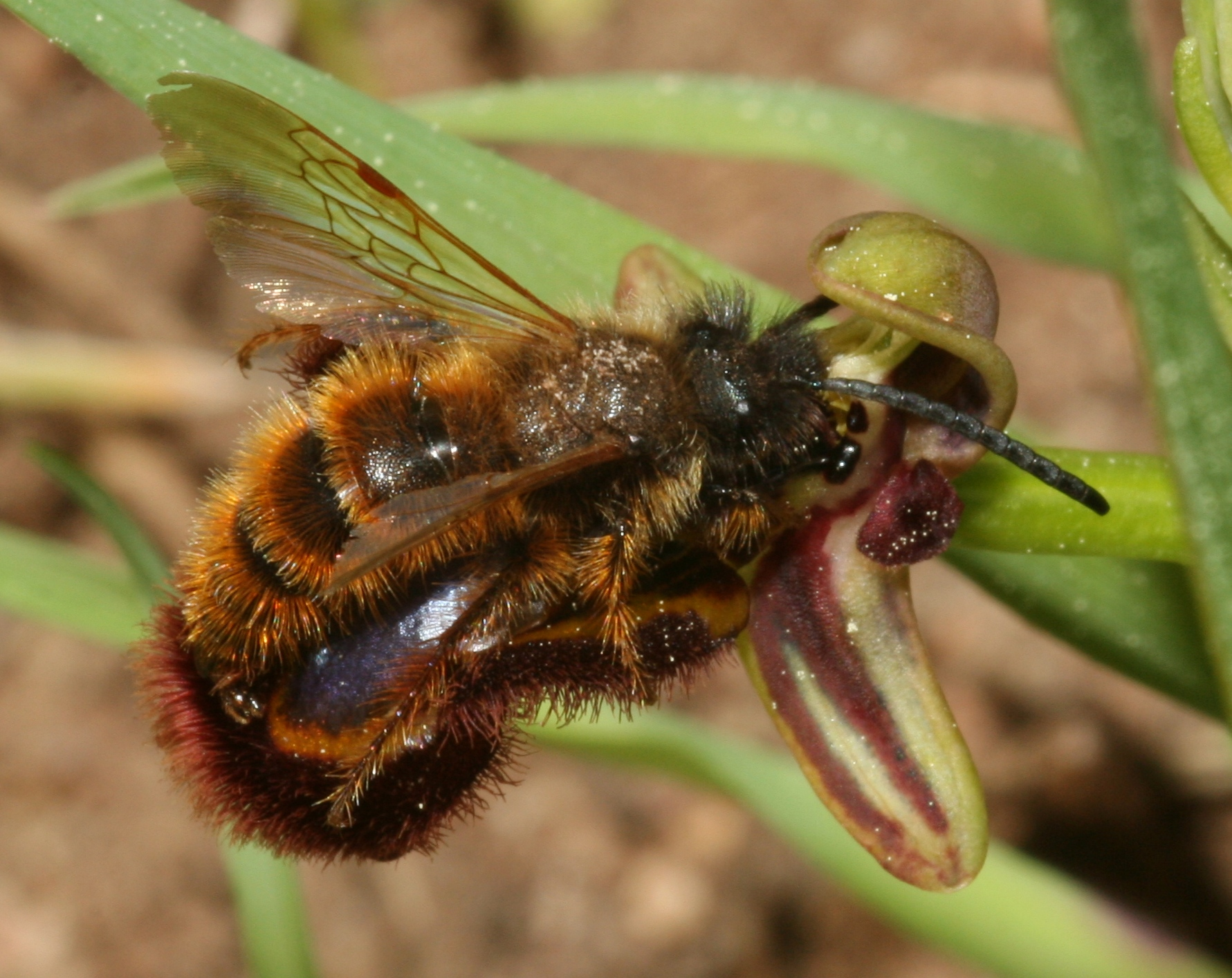
Dasyscolia ciliata, a scoliid wasp, attempting to copulate with a flower of the orchid Ophrys speculum

In Pouyannian mimicry, a flower mimics a female of a certain insect species, inducing the males of that species to try to copulate with the flower. This is much like aggressive mimicry in fireflies, but with a more benign outcome for the pollinator. The mechanism is named after Maurice-Alexandre Pouyanne, who first described the phenomenon. It is most common in orchids, which mimic females of the order Hymenoptera (generally bees and wasps), and may account for around 60% of pollinations. Depending on the morphology of the flower, a pollen sac called a pollinium is attached to the head or abdomen of the male. This is then transferred to the stigma of the next flower the male tries to inseminate, resulting in pollination. The mimicry is a combination of visual, by olfaction, and by touch.

=== Vavilovian ===
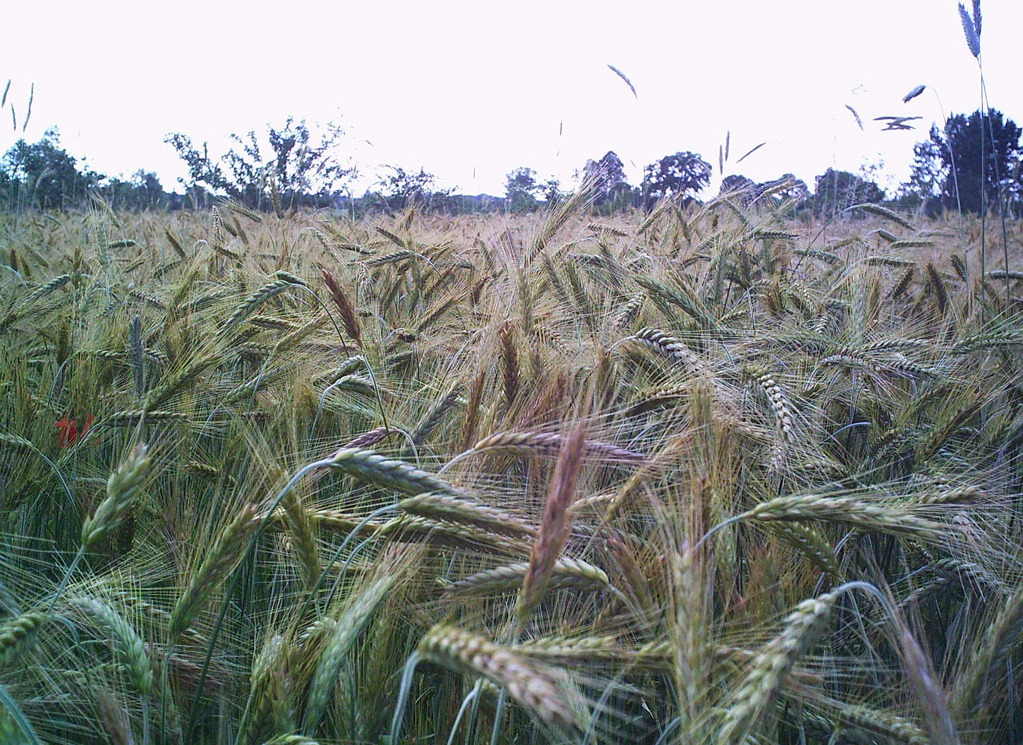
Rye is a secondary crop, originally being a mimetic weed of wheat.

Vavilovian mimicry is found in weeds that come to share characteristics with a domesticated plant through unintentional selection. It is named after Russian botanist and geneticist Nikolai Vavilov. Selection against the weed may occur either by manually killing the weed, or by separating its seeds from those of the crop by winnowing. Vavilovian mimicry illustrates unintentional selection by man. Weeders do not want to select weeds and their seeds that look increasingly like cultivated plants, yet there is no other option. For example, early barnyard grass, Echinochloa oryzoides, is a weed in rice fields and looks similar to rice; its seeds are often mixed in rice and have become difficult to separate through Vavilovian mimicry. Vavilovian mimics may eventually be domesticated themselves, as in the case of rye in wheat; Vavilov called these weed-crops secondary crops.

=== Inter-sexual mimicry ===
Inter-sexual mimicry (a type of automimicry, as it is within a single species) occurs when individuals of one sex in a species mimic members of the opposite sex to facilitate sneak mating. An example is the three male forms of the marine isopod Paracerceis sculpta. Alpha males are the largest and guard a harem of females. Beta males mimic females and manage to enter the harem of females without being detected by the alpha males allowing them to mate. Gamma males are the smallest males and mimic juveniles. This also allows them to mate with the females without the alpha males detecting them. Similarly, among common side-blotched lizards, some males mimic the yellow throat coloration and even mating rejection behaviour of the other sex to sneak matings with guarded females. These males look and behave like unreceptive females. This strategy is effective against "usurper" males with orange throats, but ineffective against blue throated "guarder" males, which chase them away. Female spotted hyenas have pseudo-penises that make them look like males.

== See also ==
- Attitude (psychology)
- Biomimicry
- Chemical mimicry
- Locomotor mimicry
- Mimic octopus
- Molecular mimicry
- Psychology
- Preadaptation
- Semiotics
