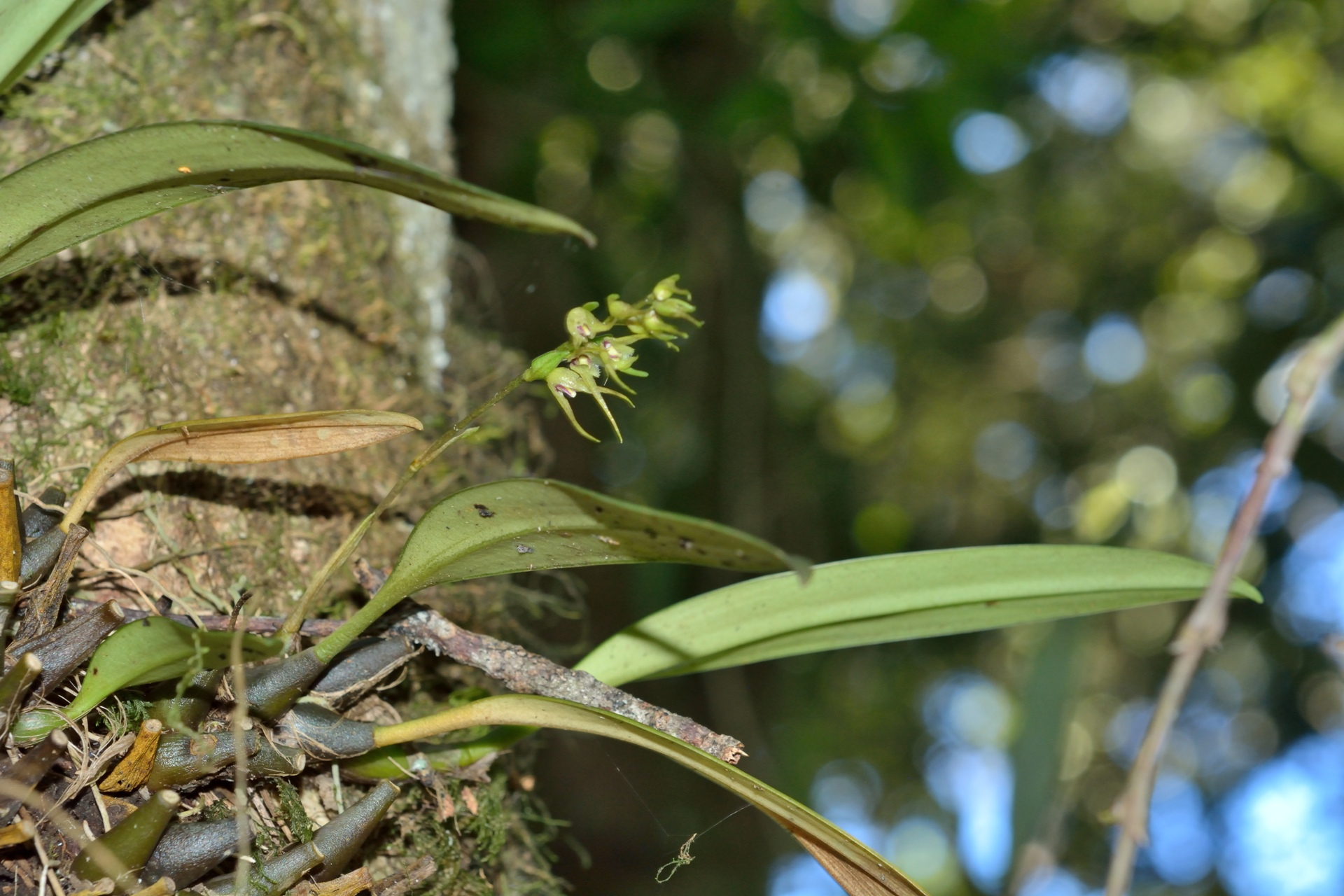
- Bulbophyllum scabratum

Scientific classification
- Kingdom: Plantae
- Clade: Tracheophytes
- Clade: Angiosperms
- Clade: Monocots
- Order: Asparagales
- Family: Orchidaceae
- Subfamily: Epidendroideae
- Genus: Bulbophyllum
- Section: Bulbophyllum sect. Eublepharon; J J Verm., Schuit. & de Vogel 2014

Type species
- Bulbophyllum eublepharon

Species
- See text

= Bulbophyllum sect. Eublepharon =

Section of flowering plants

Bulbophyllum sect. Eublepharon is a section of the genus Bulbophyllum.

== Description ==
Species in this section are epiphytes with creeping rhizomes and pseudobulbs that wrinkle with age along longitudinal lines.

== Distribution ==
Plants from this section are found in China, India, Vietnam, and Japan.

== Species ==
Bulbophyllum section Eublepharon comprises the following species:

Image	Name	Distribution	Elevation (m)
	Bulbophyllum eublepharum Rchb.f. 1861	India(Assam), Nepal, China (Xizang, Yunnan), Bhutan, and Myanmar	2,000–2,500 metres (6,600–8,200 ft)
	Bulbophyllum scabratum Rchb. f. 1861	China (Hong Kong and Fujian, Guangdong, Guangxi, Hunan, Jiangxi, Yunnan and Zhejiang), Taiwan, Assam India, Bangladesh, eastern Himalayas, Nepal, Bhutan, Sikkim, Vietnam, Laos and Thailand	900–2,000 metres (3,000–6,600 ft)
	Bulbophyllum vietnamense Seidenf. 1975	Vietnam	
