= Mimicry in plants =

Evolutionary mechanism

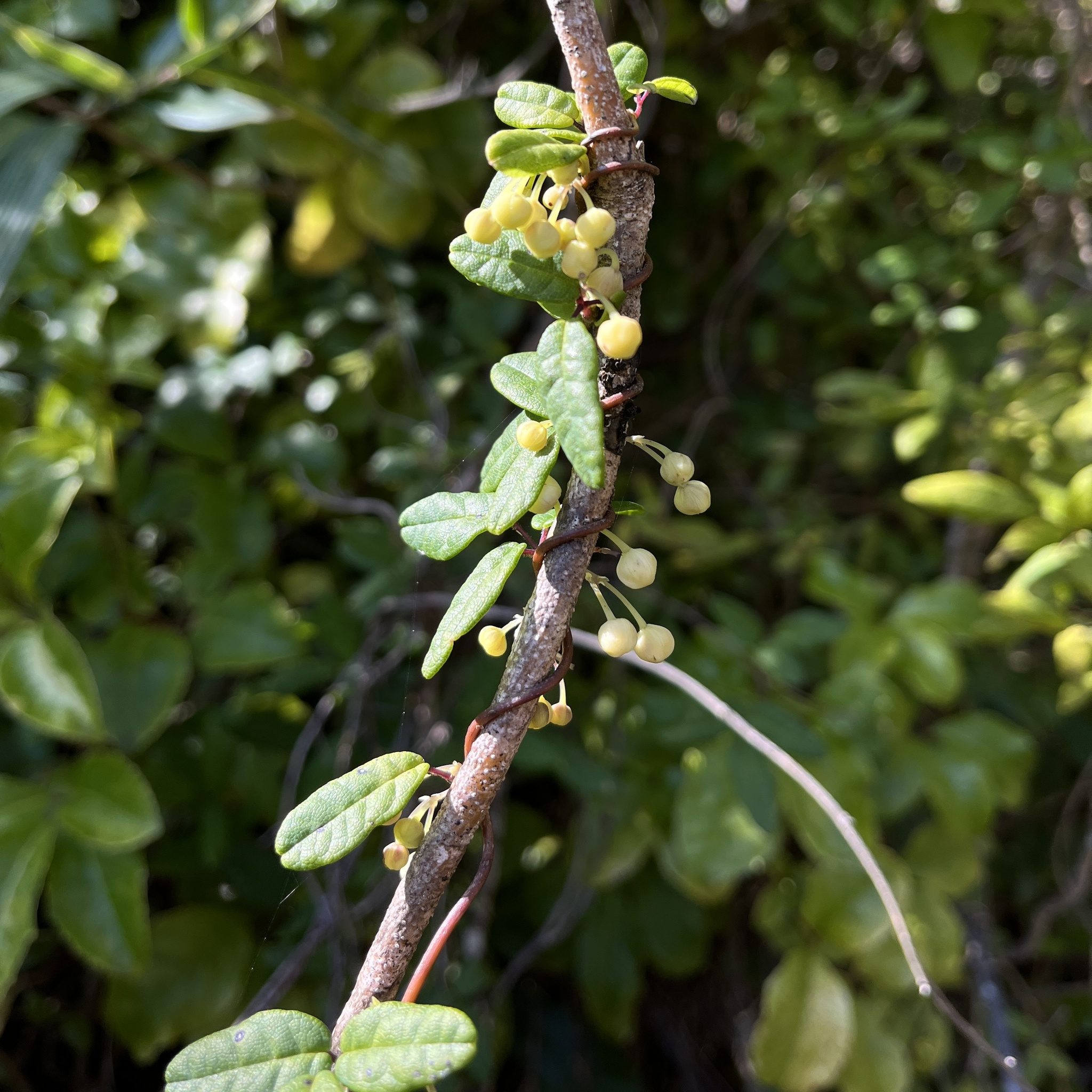
The climber Boquila trifoliata varies its leaf shape to resemble the plant it is climbing on, perhaps reducing its conspicuousness to herbivores.

Some plants have evolved mimicry–resemblance to another organism, whether physical or chemical–which may provide protection against herbivory, or may deceptively encourage mutualists, like pollinators, to provide a service without offering a reward in return. Mimicry in plants has been studied far less than mimicry in animals.

Types of plant mimicry include Bakerian mimicry, where female flowers imitate males of the same species; Dodsonian mimicry, where a plant mimics a rewarding flower, luring pollinators by mimicking another species of flower, or fruit where feeders of the other species are attracted to a fake fruit to distribute seeds; Gilbertian, where a plant has structures like butterfly eggs, dissuading egg-laying; Vavilovian, where a weed is unintentionally selected to resemble a crop plant; Pouyannian, in which a flower imitates a female mate, deceiving a male pollinating insect into pseudocopulation; Batesian, where a harmless species deters predators by mimicking the characteristics of a harmful species; and leaf mimicry, where a plant is camouflaged by resembling a nearby plant to evade the attention of herbivores.

== Context ==
=== Adaptation ===
Mimicry is an adaptation by a species, called the mimic, making it resemble something else, called the model, with the effect of deceiving another species, the dupe. The three are not always all distinct, as mimicry can for example be within a species. The adaptation is to the evolutionary advantage of the mimic. As such it can be any mechanism that may evolve by natural selection; no conscious intention is involved. There is no essential difference between the evolution of mimicry in plants and in other organisms, though mimicry in animals is better known. Plant mimicry can broadly be divided into reproductive mimicry that deceives pollinators into providing their service without rewarding them in return, and protective mimicry that deceives herbivores into not eating the plant.

=== History of research ===
Mimicry mechanisms, including the Batesian and Müllerian mimicry, were described in animals in the 19th century. Charles Darwin's 1862 book Fertilisation of Orchids laid the foundations for research into plant reproductive strategies co-evolved with insects. In the book, Darwin wonders why some orchids apparently mimic bees, and how orchids without nectar succeed in attracting pollinators. Several mimicry mechanisms in plants were described in the 20th century, starting with Pouyannian (1916), Vavilovian (1951), and Gilbertian (1975). Study of mimicry in plants broadened in the 21st century, with the discovery of Batesian mimicry in plants in 2003, and crypsis or leaf mimicry in 2014. Until then, mimicry in plants was studied infrequently, both because it is uncommon and because botanists considered mainly physical factors in plant ecology. It may be that since plants often grow in clusters, foraging herbivores are hard to deceive once they have started to feed in an area.

== Reproductive ==
=== Brood-site deception ===
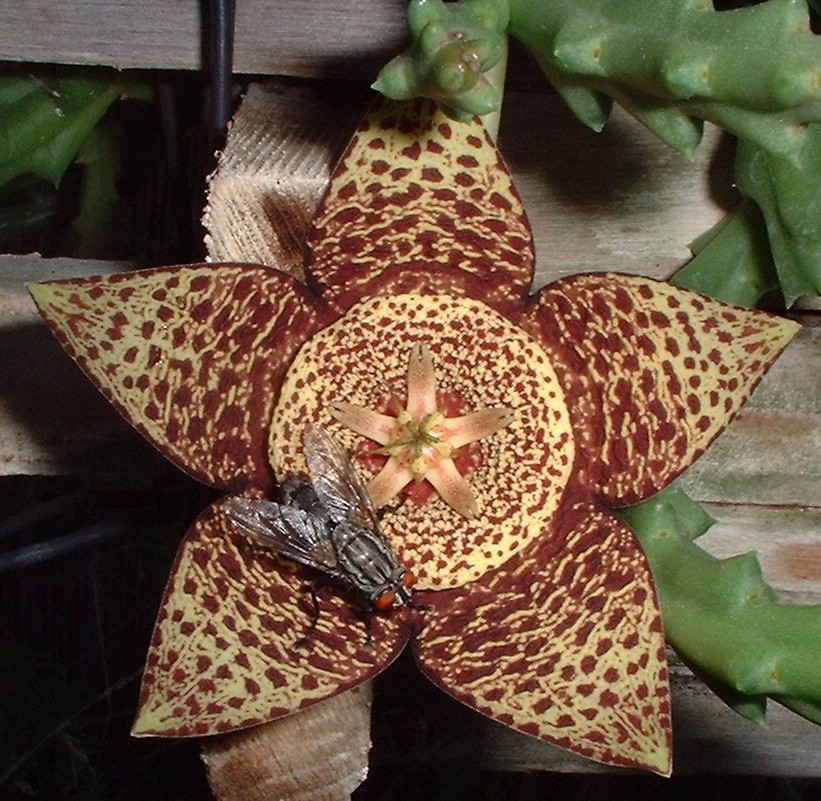
Carrion flowers attract flies and other carrion-feeding insects by their smell. Orbea variegata illustrated.

Carrion flowers, including the enormous Amorphophallus titanum, mimic the scent and appearance of rotting flesh to attract necrophagous (carrion-feeding) insects like flesh flies (Sarcophagidae), blowflies (Calliphoridae), house flies (Muscidae) and some beetles (e.g., Dermestidae and Silphidae) which search for dead animals to use as brood sites. The decaying smell of the flower comes from oligosulfides, compounds found in decayed proteins with the sulfur-containing amino acids methionine and cysteine. While carrion flowers do produce a small amount of nectar, this does not necessarily make their relationship to necrophagous insects mutualistic. Insects lay eggs on the carrion flowers, meaning they mistake the flowers for oviposition sites. The nectar acts as a lure to bring the insects closer to the reproductive parts of the flower.

=== Bakerian ===
Bakerian mimicry, named after English naturalist Herbert Baker, is a form of automimicry or intraspecific mimicry that occurs within a single species. In plants, the female flowers mimic male flowers of their own species, cheating pollinators out of a reward. This reproductive mimicry may not be readily apparent as members of the same species may still exhibit some degree of sexual dimorphism, i.e. the phenotypic difference between males and females of the same species. It is common in many species of Caricaceae, a family of flowering plants in the order Brassicales, found primarily in tropical regions of Central and South America, and Africa.

=== Dodsonian ===
Dodsonian mimicry, named after the American botanist Calaway H. Dodson, is a form of reproductive floral mimicry where the model belongs to a different species than the mimic. By providing similar sensory signals to the model's flowers, the mimic lures the model's pollinators. Like Bakerian mimics, no nectar is provided.

Epidendrum ibaguense, a species of epiphytic orchid of the genus Epidendrum that occurs in the northern part of South America, resembles flowers of Lantana camara and Asclepias curassavica. Epidendrum ibaguense is pollinated by monarch butterfly (Danaus plexippus) and perhaps hummingbirds. Similar cases are seen in some other species of the same family. The mimetic species may still have pollinators of its own; for example, a Lamellicorn beetle helps to pollinate Ophrys species mainly pollinated by bees.

=== Pouyannian ===
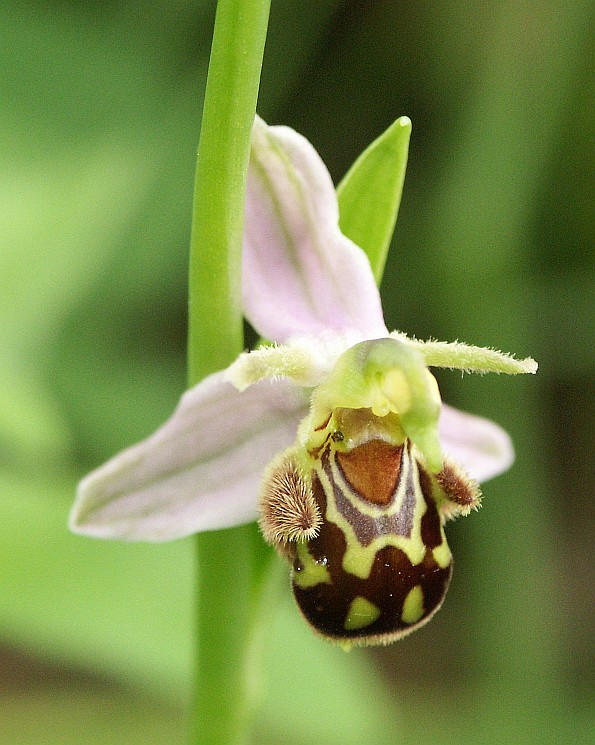
Bee orchid flower resembles a female bee closely enough to attract males in search of a mate

In Pouyannian mimicry, named after the French lawyer and amateur botanist Maurice-Alexandre Pouyanne, flowers mimic a male pollinator's potential female mate, visually or with other stimuli. Many orchids, including the Ophrys bee orchids, deceive male insects into pseudocopulation in this way, using them to transfer pollen. For instance, the orchid Epipactis helleborine is physiologically and morphologically adapted to attract social wasps as their primary pollinators. Social wasps feed their larvae on insects such as caterpillars. To locate that prey, they use a combination of visual and olfactory cues. The flowers of E. helleborine and E. purpurata emit green-leaf volatiles attractive to foragers of the social wasps Vespula germanica and V. vulgaris. E. helleborine emits several green-leaf volatiles that induce a response in wasp antennae. These same volatiles are also produced by cabbage leaves infested with caterpillars (Pieris brassicae), which are common prey items for wasps. Despite a large nectar reward, the species is almost entirely overlooked by other pollinators.

== Defensive ==
=== Batesian ===
In Batesian mimicry, named after the English naturalist Henry Walter Bates, a harmless species has evolved to imitate the warning signals of a harmful species directed at a predator. Batesian mimicry of thorns and possibly of spider webs has been observed in plants.

Thorn mimicry of two types has been observed in plants. The first, a special case of intra-organismic Batesian mimicry characteristic of Aloe species (Liliaceae), Washingtonia filifera (Arecaceae), and dozens of species of Agave, including A. applanta, A. salmiana, and A. obscura. These plants develop thornlike imprints or colorations on the face of their leaves due to the teeth along the margins of that leaf (or another leaf) pressing sustained indentations into the flesh of the non-spiny parts. The second type of thorn mimicry, a more classic case of Batesian mimicry, involves the pointed, colorful organs like buds, leaves and fruit of mimetic plant species that mimic warning-coloured aposematic colorful thorns not found anywhere else in the organism.

Several plants from different parts of the world may be mimics of spider webs. Dense, white trichomes are produced on newly extended stems and leaves that deter herbivory due to predatory habit or toxicity. This may be a case of visual mimicry or perceptual exploitation. Case examples include the new buds of Onopordum from Israel, Carthamus species from Greece, flower heads of Arctium tomentosum from Estonia, a fledgling leaf of Tussilago farfara from Estonia, and new fronds of Osmunda japonica from Japan.

Another plant leaf pattern has been suggested to be mimetic: irregular white blotches on leaves of plants such as Pulmonaria officinalis perhaps protect against large herbivores through their resemblance to bird droppings, which could be avoided as possible sources of disease.

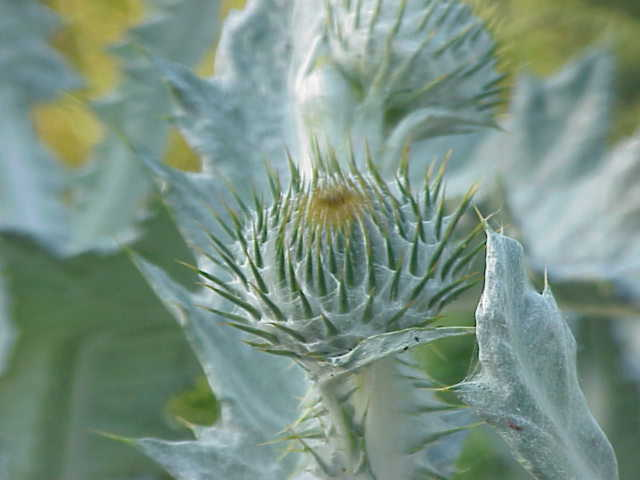
Plants such as Onopordum have dense white trichomes, which may offer protection from herbivory through their resemblance to spider webs.

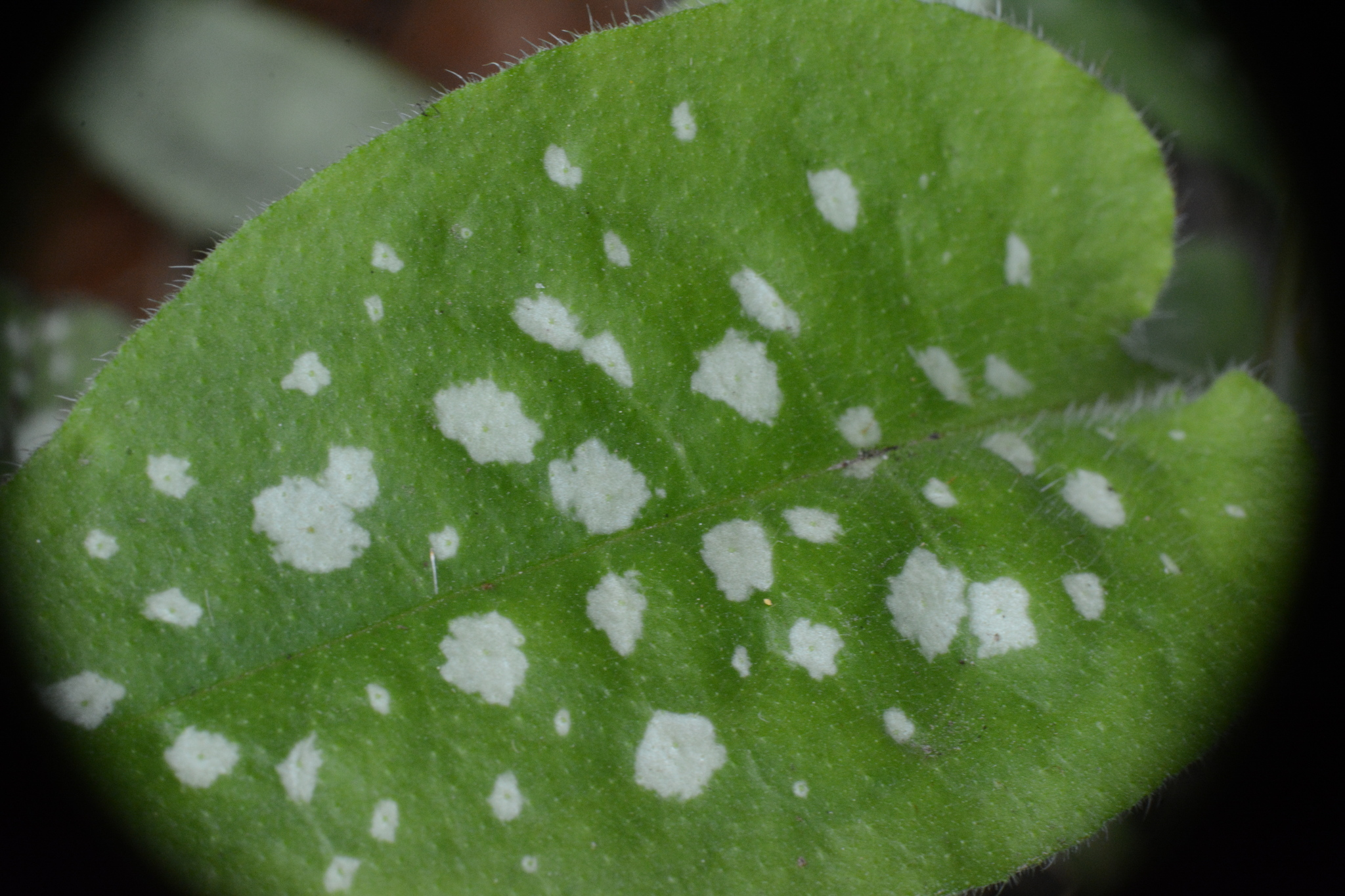
Leaves of plants such as Pulmonaria officinalis have irregular white blotches that may look like bird droppings to herbivores.

Some plants mimic the presence of insect eggs on their leaves, dissuading insect species from laying their eggs there. Because female butterflies are less likely to lay their eggs on plants that already have butterfly eggs, some species of neotropical vines of the genus Passiflora (passion flowers) make use of Gilbertian mimicry: they possess physical structures resembling the yellow eggs of Heliconius butterflies on their leaves, which discourage oviposition by butterflies.

=== Gilbertian ===
Gilbertian or colonisation mimicry is bipolar, involving only two species. The potential host (or prey) drives away its parasite (or predator) by mimicking it, the reverse of host–parasite aggressive mimicry. Georges Pasteur named it after the American ecologist Lawrence E. Gilbert, who described it in 1975. The classical instance of Gilbertian mimicry is in the plant genus Passiflora, which is grazed by the micropredator larvae of some Heliconius butterflies. The host plants have evolved stipules, small outgrowths on the leaf, (Note: See Lawrence Gilbert's egg mimicry leaf photograph.) that mimic mature Heliconius eggs near the point of hatching. The butterflies avoid laying eggs near existing ones, reducing intraspecific competition between caterpillars, which are also cannibalistic, so those that lay on vacant leaves provide their offspring with a greater chance of survival. The stipules thus appear to have evolved as Gilbertian mimics of butterfly eggs, under selection pressure from these caterpillars.

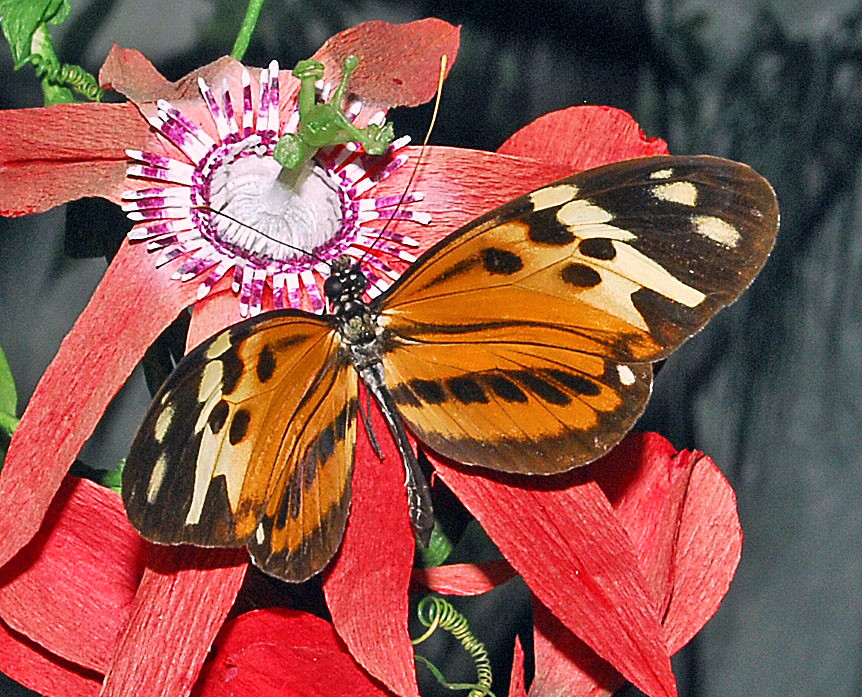
Some Passiflora flower species use Gilbertian mimicry, defending against being eaten by larvae of Heliconius butterflies with leaf stipules (not shown) that resemble the butterfly's eggs.

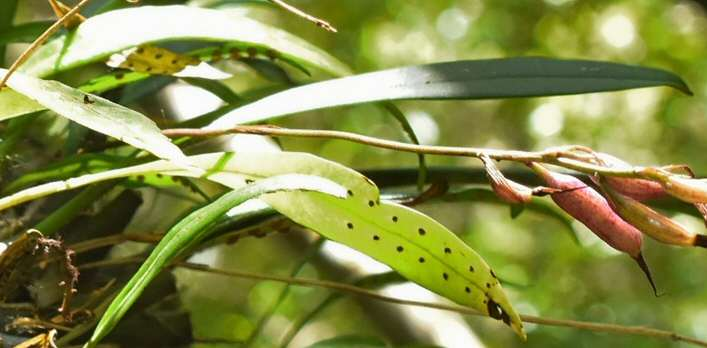
Butterfly egg mimicry in the orchid Bulbophyllum scabratum

=== Crypsis ===
In ecology, crypsis is an organism's ability to avoid detection by other organisms. In cryptic mimicry, a prey organism deceives a predator by providing false signals, often visual, so as to camouflage itself.

==== Leaf mimicry ====
One form of crypsis is leaf mimicry. Boquila trifoliata, a South American member of the family Lardizabalaceae, is a climbing vine with a highly variable appearance (phenotype). It is capable of mimicking the leaf features of plant species that it clings to, such as their coloration, size, and shape. By camouflaging its leaves, Boquila reduces damage from herbivorous animals. It has been speculated that such plants may make use of "some kind of vision" using ocelli, or "delicate chemical sensing", to account for the mimic's ability to cope with such a large number of variables in its model's appearance, including the ability to mimic the foliage of an artificial host plant made of plastic. Another plant that could well be a cryptic mimic of its host is the parasitic Australian mistletoe, Amyema cambagei, which has an "uncanny resemblance" to the foliage of Casuarina trees.

==== Stone mimicry ====
Some hundreds of species in the Mesembryanthemaceae (ice plants) of Southern Africa are camouflaged by masquerade as small stones, especially Lithops, which are known as pebble plants or living stones. By appearing non-living, they are less likely to be eaten by herbivores, and in dusty dry conditions among stones are extremely difficult to detect.

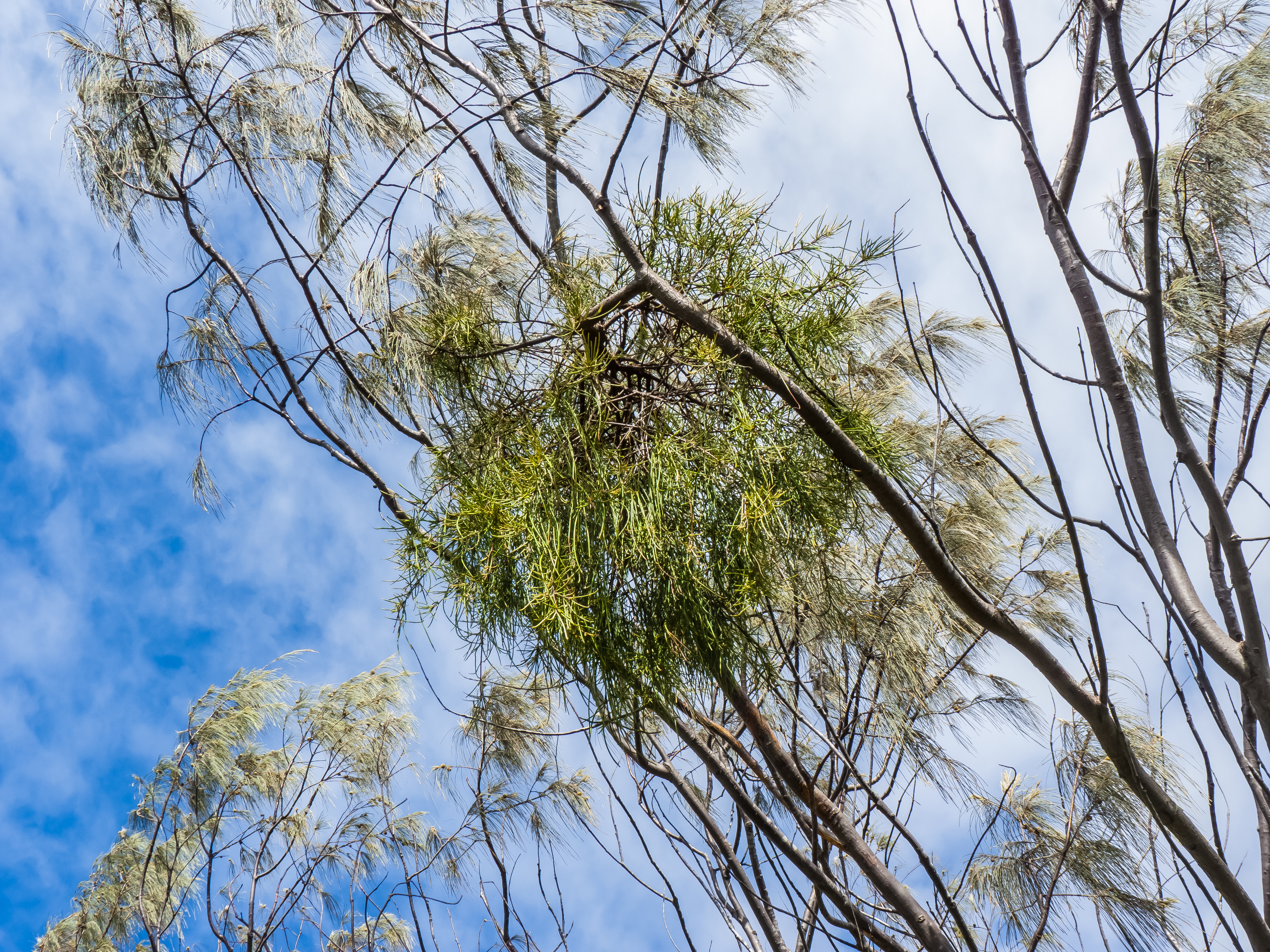
The epiphytic parasite Amyema cambagei (centre) has leaves closely resembling those of its various hosts, here Casuarina equisetifolia.

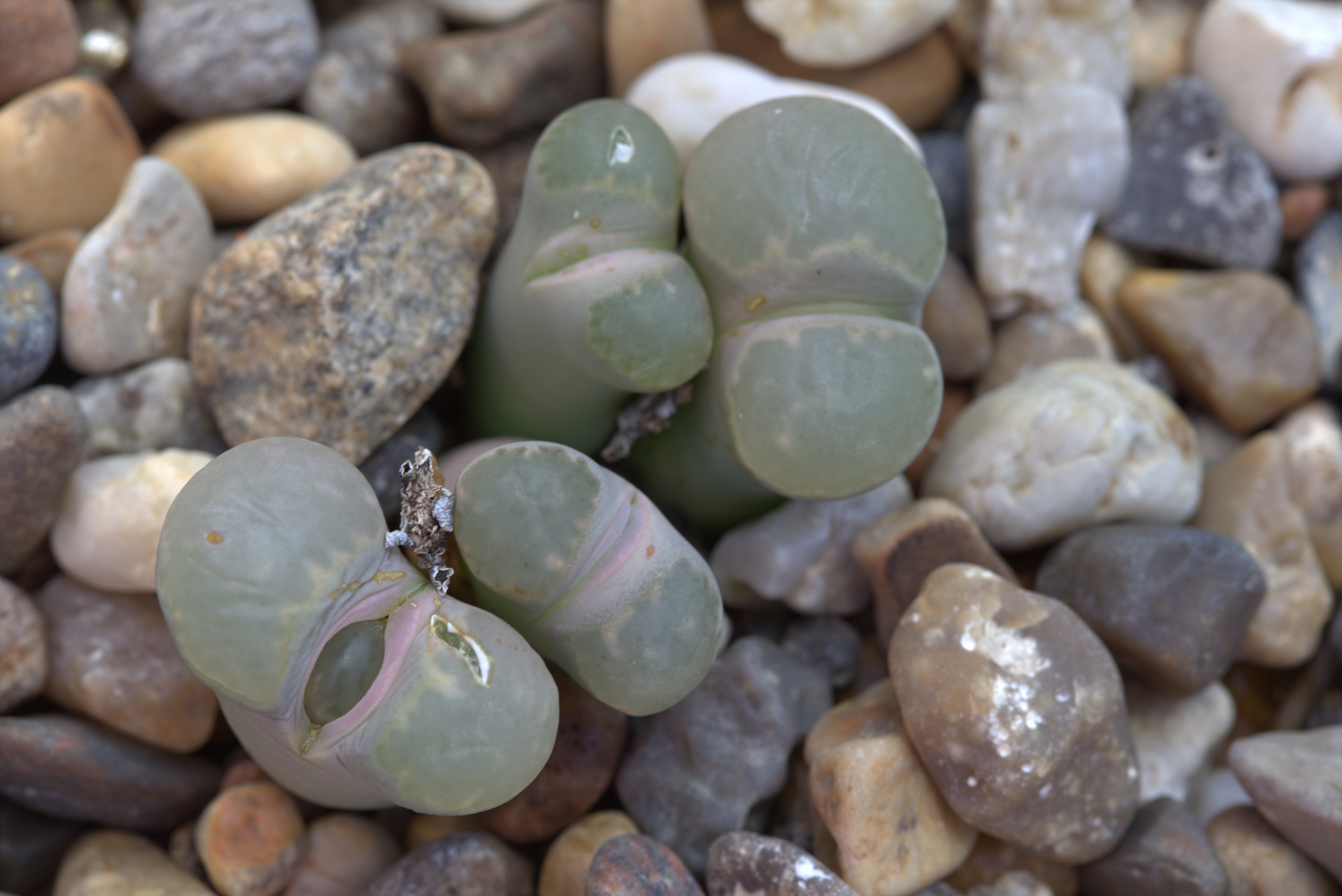
The cryptic Lithops salicola, a pebble plant, camouflaged as small stones

== In cultivation ==
=== Vavilovian ===
Vavilovian mimicry (also known as crop mimicry or weed mimicry) is named after the Russian plant geneticist who identified the centres of origin of cultivated plants, Nikolai Vavilov. It is a form of mimicry in plants where a weed comes to share one or more characteristics with a domesticated plant through generations of unintentional selection. Selection against the weed may occur by killing a young or adult weed, separating its seeds from those of the crop (winnowing), or both. This has been done manually since Neolithic times, and in more recent years by agricultural machinery.

Evolution of Vavilovian mimicry: the farmer or a machine winnows the seed (or weeds the crop) to remove as many weeds as possible, unintentionally selecting the weeds that best resemble the crop.

== In popular culture ==
Darwin's open questions about orchid fertilisation stimulated popularizers such as Grant Allen to write on the topic, and led the science fiction writer H. G. Wells to tell a tale of killer orchids, his 1896 "The Flowering of the Strange Orchid". The vampire-like plant attacks people using "tentacle-like aerial rootlets". Other authors followed with similar tales of their own.

== See also ==
- Chemical mimicry
- Deception in animals
