= Vavilovian mimicry =

Type of biological mimicry in plants

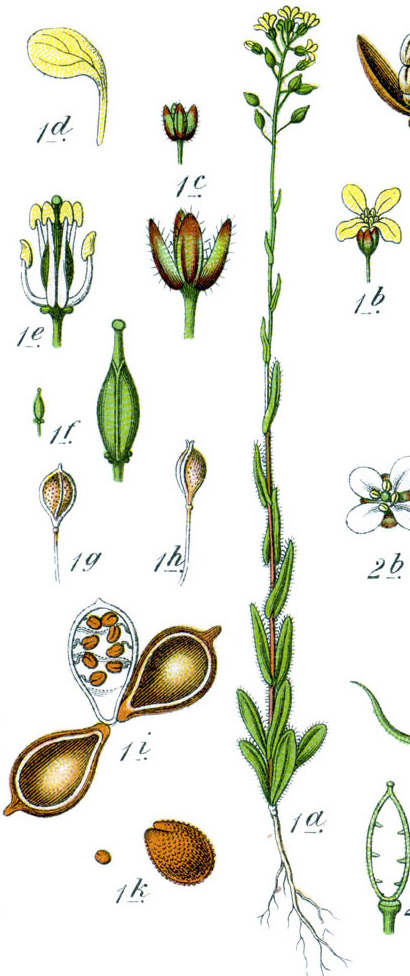
The gold-of-pleasure or false flax resembles flax, and its seeds are practically inseparable from the flax seed.

In plant biology and agriculture, Vavilovian mimicry (also crop mimicry or weed mimicry) is a form of mimicry in plants where a weed evolves to share characteristics with a crop plant through generations of involuntary artificial selection. It is named after the Russian plant geneticist Nikolai Vavilov.

Selection against the weed may occur by killing a young or adult weed, by separating its seeds from those of the crop by winnowing, or both. The process has operated since Neolithic times, creating secondary crops such as rye and oats through mimicry of cereals such as wheat.

== Definition ==
Vavilovian mimicry is a form of mimicry in plants where a weed of cultivation evolves to share characteristics with a crop through generations of artificial selection. It is sometimes described as crop mimicry or weed mimicry. It is named after Nikolai Vavilov, a prominent Russian plant geneticist of the early 20th century. In addition, Vavilov described as 'secondary crops' cereals such as rye that he believed derived from weeds that mimicked other cereals.

== Classification ==
Evolutionary biologists describe mimicry in terms of three roles for the species involved: mimic, model, and dupe. The mimic is the species that in some ways resembles the model, creating a deception; the dupe is the species that is deceived. Vavilovian mimicry is disjunct, meaning that the mimic, model, and dupe involved are all from different species. In Georges Pasteur's terms, the model is "agreeable to the dupe" (e.g. farmers intentionally plant and harvest wheat), whereas in Batesian mimicry, the model is "forbidding to the dupe" (e.g. birds find wasps unpleasant, and try to avoid them).

Vavilovian vs Batesian mimicry, for a secondary crop like rye. Both types are disjunct, with separate mimics, models, and dupes. The types differ in that in Batesian mimicry, the dupe (a predator) avoids the model (e.g. a wasp), whereas in Vavilovian mimicry, the dupe (a farmer) intentionally grows the model (e.g. wheat). The mimicry can be of the seed, of the whole plant, or both.

Vavilovian mimicry can be classified as reproductive, because it provides a means for the mimic to reproduce – as when rye seeds are unintentionally sown as wheat by the farmer, or when rye seedlings or older plants are unintentionally allowed to grow in a wheat field because they look like wheat. It can further be counted as aggressive (as if parasitic), because its propagation is at the expense of the intended crop: if there is more rye in a field, there is less wheat. Finally, in the case of secondary crops, it can be considered mutualistic, as both the rye, and the farmer who grows and eats it, benefit from the process.

Delbert Wiens has argued that secondary crops cannot be classified as mimics, because they result from artificial as opposed to natural selection, and because the selective agent is a machine. Pasteur points out that "indirect artificial selection" is involuntary and thus no different from natural selection. Farmers do not wish to cause weeds to become steadily more difficult to separate from their crops by removing weeds which do not resemble the crops, but they have no option because the alternative is to let the weeds flourish. Pasteur adds that manual selection has been occurring since the Neolithic Revolution, at which time no machinery was involved.

Evolution of Vavilovian mimicry: the farmer winnows the seed (or weeds the crop) to remove as many weeds as possible, unintentionally selecting the weeds that best resemble the crop.

== Secondary crops ==
Among the cereals, rye (Secale cereale) is derived from wild rye (Secale montanum), a widely distributed Mediterranean species. Rye was originally just a weed growing with wheat and barley, but came under similar selective pressures to the crops. Like wheat, it came to have larger seeds and more rigid spindles to which the seeds are attached, as farmers (intentionally or not) selected for grains that remained on the plant. Weeds such as rye were selected against by killing young or adult plants, separating its seeds from those of the crop (winnowing), or both. Further, wheat is an annual plant, while wild rye is a perennial. At the end of each growing season wheat produces seeds, while wild rye does not, and is thus destroyed when the post-harvest soil is tilled. However, occasional mutants do set seed; they were protected from destruction. Rye has thus evolved to become an annual plant, and in Vavilov's terms a secondary or mimetic crop.

Rye is a hardier plant than wheat, surviving in harsher conditions. Having become preadapted as a crop through wheat mimicry, rye was then positioned to become a cultivated plant in areas where soil and climatic conditions favored its production, such as mountainous terrain.

This fate is shared by oats (Avena sativa and Avena byzantina), which also tolerate poorer conditions, and like rye, grow as a weed alongside wheat and barley. Derived from a wild species (Avena sterilis), it has thus come to be a crop in its own right. Once again paralleling wheat, rye and other cereals, oats have developed tough spindles which prevent seeds from easily dropping off, while other characteristics which help in natural dispersal have become vestigial, including the awns which allow them to self bury.

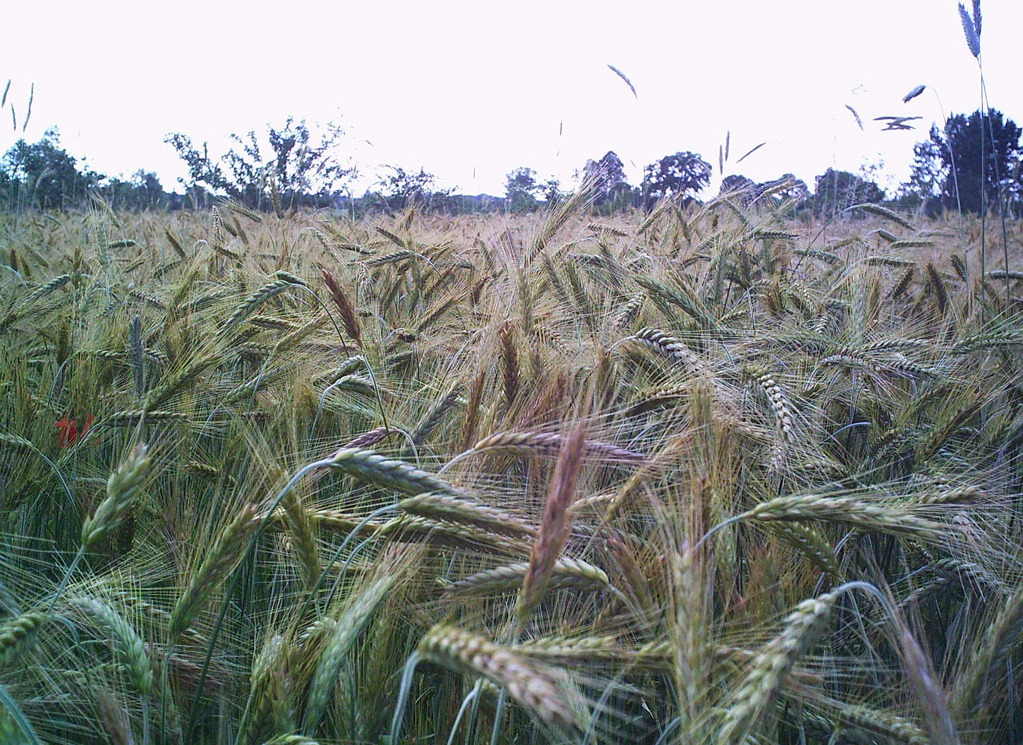
Rye is a secondary crop, originally being a mimetic weed of wheat.

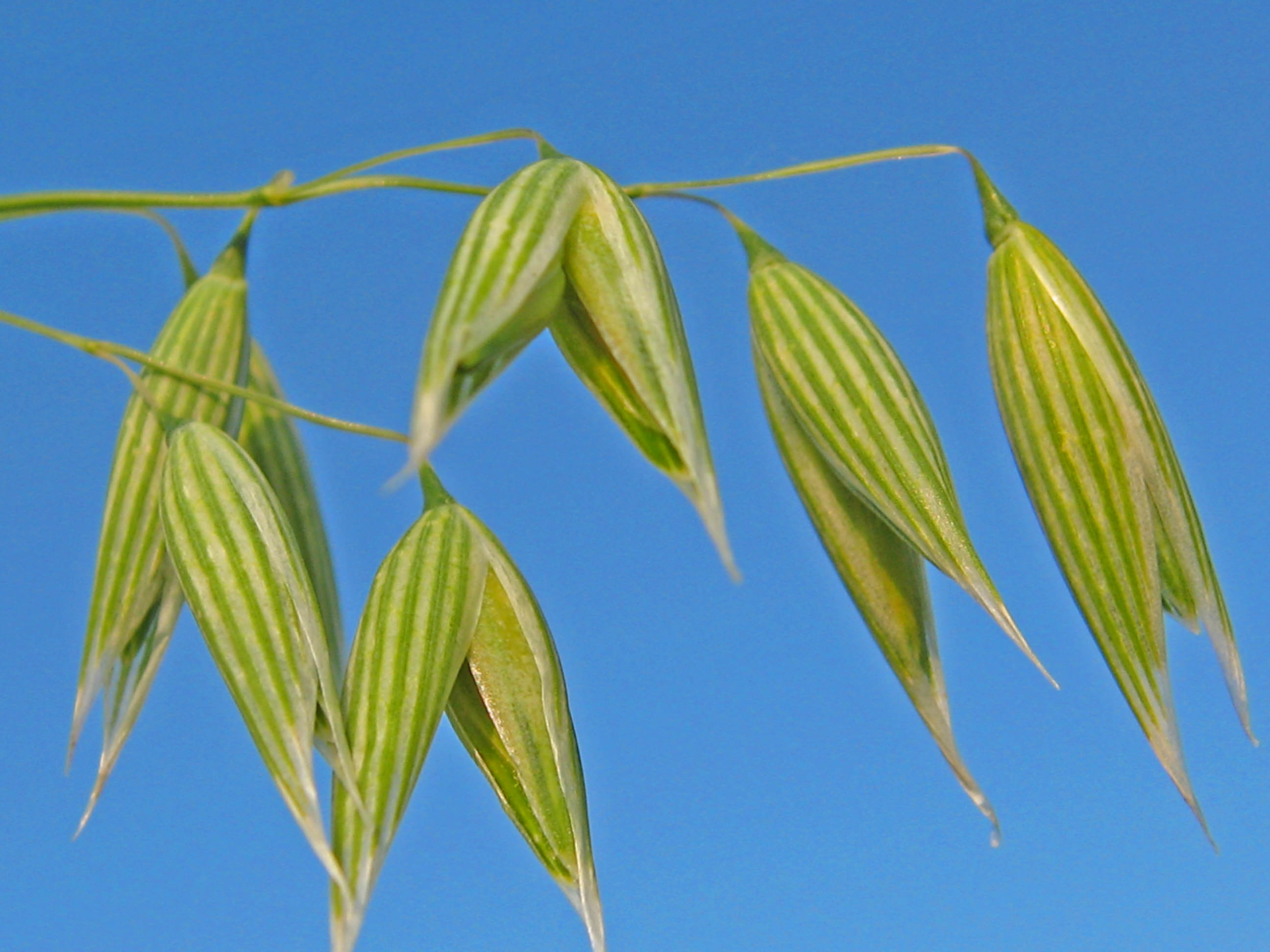
Though now an important crop, oats were once just another weed.

== Weeds ==
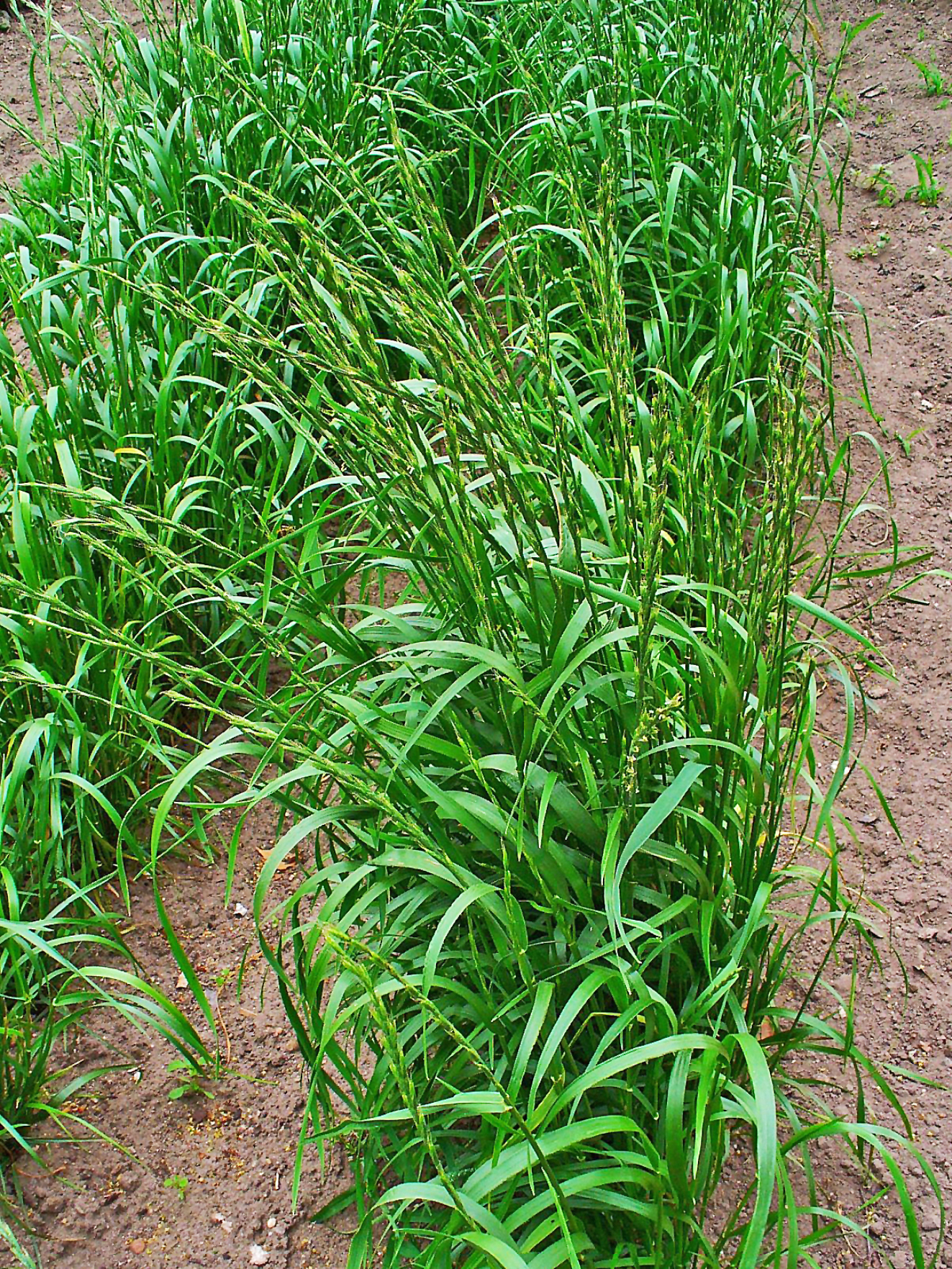
Lolium temulentum (darnel) closely resembles wheat until the ear appears.

Weeding of adult plants is generally impractical; instead they are separated based on properties of the seed. The gold-of-pleasure or false flax (Camelina sativa linicola) looks much like the flax plant Linum usitatissimum, and occurs alongside it in the field. This is done by a winnowing machine, which in this case acts as an inanimate dupe. Seeds that the machine throws the same distance as flax seeds have thus been selected for, making it nearly impossible to separate the seeds of these two species.

The flax-dodder (Cuscuta epilinum) is a parasitic creeper that grows around flax (linseed) plants, harming the crop. Much like the other cases, its seeds have become larger. A mutant double-seeded variety has become prevalent, as seed size has once again been the character upon which selection has acted.

Selection can occur on the vegetative stage, through hand weeding. Weeding often takes place when the crop plant is very young, and at its most vulnerable. Echinochloa oryzoides, a species of grass which is found as a weed in rice (Oryza sativa) fields, looks similar to rice and its seeds are often mixed in rice and difficult to separate. This close similarity has been enhanced by the weeding process, an unintentionally selective force that increases the similarity of the weed to the crop in each subsequent generation.

== See also ==
- Threshing

== Sources ==
- Barrett, Spencer H. (1983). "Crop Mimicry in Weeds". Economic Botany. 37 (3): 255–282. doi:10.1007/BF02858881. S2CID 33048581. One of the most extensive articles on the topic.
- Wiens, Delbert (1978). "Mimicry in Plants". Evolutionary Biology. 11: 365–403. Discussion of crop mimicry among many other plant cases.
- Radosevich, Steven R.; Holt, Jodie S.; Ghersa, Claudio (1997). Weed Ecology: Implications for Management (2nd ed.). Wiley. ISBN 0-471-11606-8.
