= Echinochloa oryzoides =

Scientific classification
- Kingdom: Plantae
- Clade: Tracheophytes
- Clade: Angiosperms
- Clade: Monocots
- Clade: Commelinids
- Order: Poales
- Family: Poaceae
- Subfamily: Panicoideae
- Genus: Echinochloa
- Species: E. oryzoides

Binomial name
- Echinochloa oryzoides (Ard.) Fritsch.

Species of grass

Echinochloa oryzoides is a species of grass known by the common name early barnyard grass. Its origin is not certain but it may be Eurasia. The grass is a major weed of rice paddies; it is a serious problem as it is an effective Vavilovian mimic of rice, very difficult to separate from the crop.
