= Gilbertian mimicry =

Form of mimicry in plants

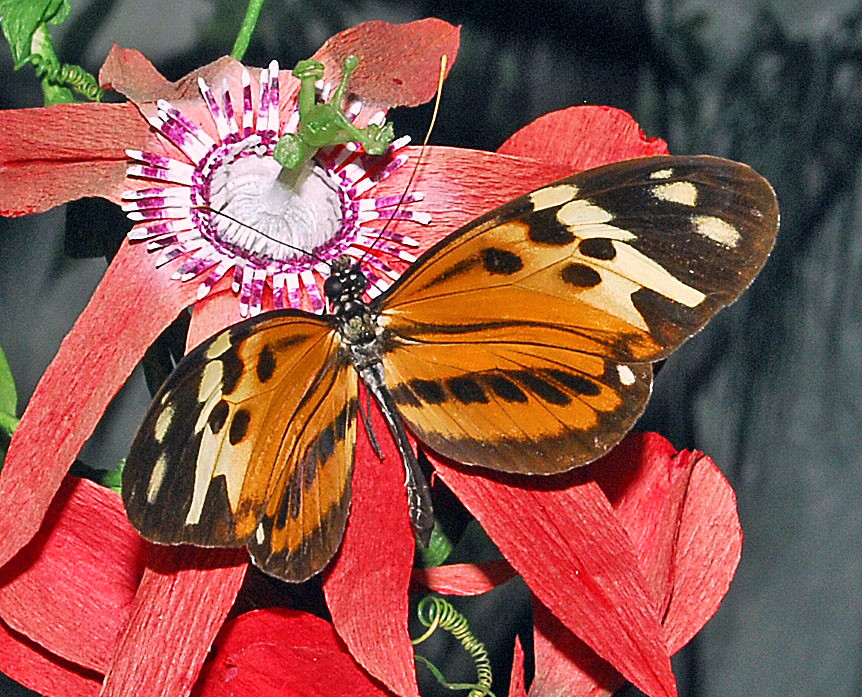
Some Passiflora flower species use Gilbertian mimicry, defending against being eaten by larvae of Heliconius butterflies with leaf stipules (not shown) that resemble the butterfly's eggs.

In evolutionary biology, Gilbertian mimicry is a rare type of mimicry in plants involving only two species, a host or prey organism which is the mimic, and its parasite or predator, which is both the model for the mimicry and the dupe that is deceived by it. The mechanism provides a measure of protection for the mimic, as parasites and predators rarely attack their own species.

The first described example of Gilbertian mimicry is the mimicking of Heliconius butterfly eggs by the leaf stipules of Passiflora plants. These are thought to protect the plant as the butterfly avoids laying eggs near eggs already on a host plant, to give her own eggs the best chance of survival.

A later example is the mimicking of a mammalian hormone by an ant toxin which causes long-lasting hypersensitivity, Gilbertian mimicry at a molecular level.

== Etymology ==
The name was coined by the French biologist Georges Pasteur as a phrase for the rare mimicry system. He named it after the American ecologist Lawrence E. Gilbert, who described the mechanism as a "coevolved mutualism" in 1975.

== Mechanism ==
In Gilbertian mimicry, a potential host or prey drives away one of its parasites or predators by mimicking it, since few parasites or predators attack their own species. The mechanism can be seen as the reverse of predator-prey or parasite-host aggressive mimicry, where the wolf-in-sheep's-clothing attacker, disguised as its prey or host, is able to approach and attack undetected. Unlike in a conventional Batesian mimicry system, where the mimic, its model, and the dupe are of three different species, the parasite or predator in a Gilbertian system is both model and dupe. Only two species are thus involved, and the system is described as bipolar.

== Passiflora stipules and Heliconius eggs ==
Gilbertian mimicry occurs in the plant genus Passiflora, which is grazed by the micropredator larvae of some Heliconius butterflies. The host plants have evolved small yellow projections on their leaves, stipules, that mimic mature Heliconius eggs near the point of hatching. Female butterflies avoid laying their eggs near eggs already on a plant, for two reasons. First, by choosing a plant without other Heliconius eggs, they reduce the amount of intraspecific competition between caterpillars. Second, the caterpillars are somewhat cannibalistic, so those females that lay on vacant leaves provide their offspring with a greater chance of not being eaten. Either way, an egg-free host plant offers the offspring the best chance of surviving to adulthood, and hence a selective advantage. The stipules thus appear to have evolved as Gilbertian mimics of butterfly eggs, under selection pressure from Heliconius.

Depiction of the logic of Gilbertian mimicry.
No implication is made of actual reasoning.
Heliconius egg, larva, and ovipositing adult female, all on Passiflora.

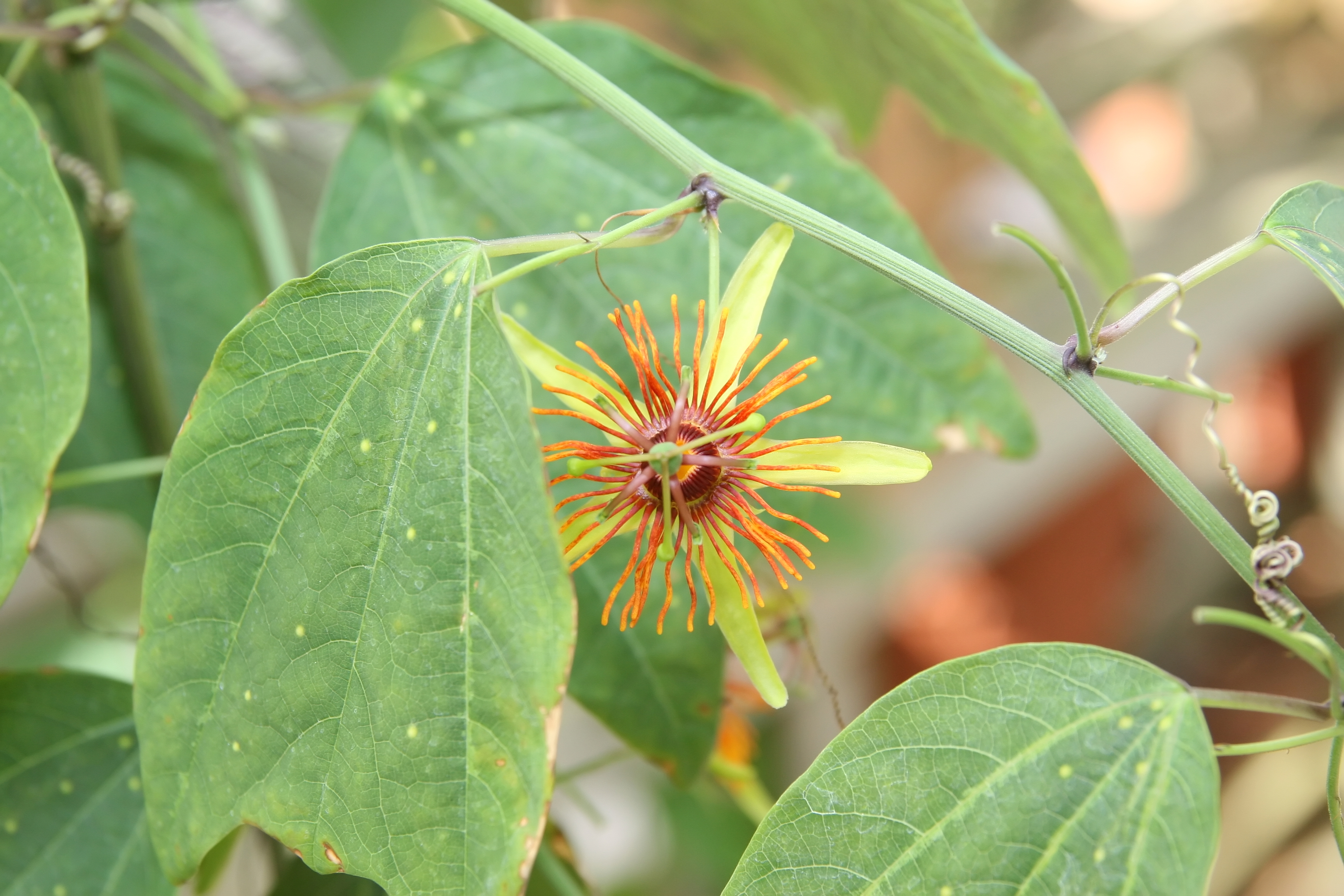
Some Passiflora leaves (upper sides shown) have yellow lumps on the underside, resembling butterfly eggs.

Gilbertian mimicry involves only two species,
unlike Batesian mimicry which has separate model, mimic, and dupe.

== Bull ant venom and epidermal growth factor ==
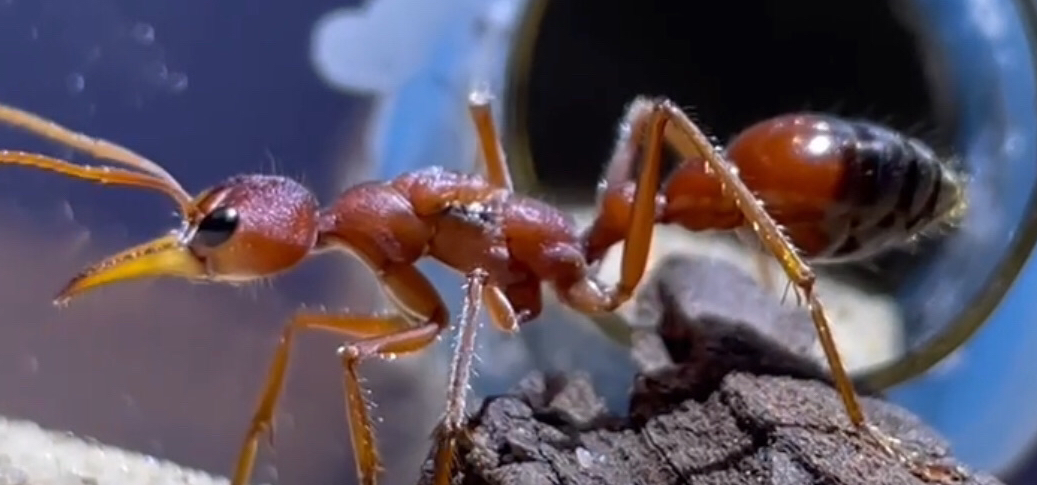
Myrmecia gulosa ants produce a venom that mimics vertebrate epidermal growth factor, causing long-lasting hypersensitivity in bitten mammals.

Another Gilbertian system involves Australian giant red bull ants, Myrmecia gulosa. These ants produce a venom which contains a substantial concentration of the toxic peptide named MIITX2-Mg1a. This mimics a vertebrate hormone, a peptide called epidermal growth factor. In a mammal's body, this powerfully activates an epidermal growth factor receptor named ErbB1. The result is long-lasting hypersensitivity in bitten mammals, implying that ErbB is involved in signalling mammalian pain. The mechanism is, according to David Eagles and colleagues, analogous to the Gilbertian Passiflora/Heliconius system, except that the mimicry exists at the level of molecules rather than whole organisms (butterfly eggs).
