= Bulbophyllum eublepharum =

Scientific classification
- Kingdom: Plantae
- Clade: Tracheophytes
- Clade: Angiosperms
- Clade: Monocots
- Order: Asparagales
- Family: Orchidaceae
- Subfamily: Epidendroideae
- Genus: Bulbophyllum
- Species: B. eublepharum

Binomial name
- Bulbophyllum eublepharum Rchb.f. 1861

Synonyms
- Bulbophyllum yuanyangense Z. H. Tsi.

Species of orchid

Bulbophyllum eublepharum is a species of orchid in the genus Bulbophyllum. Chromosome count is 2n = 38. Plants are epiphytes.

== Distribution ==
Plants are found growing in India (Assam), Nepal, China (Xizang, Yunnan), Bhutan, and Myanmar at elevations of 2000–2500 meters.
