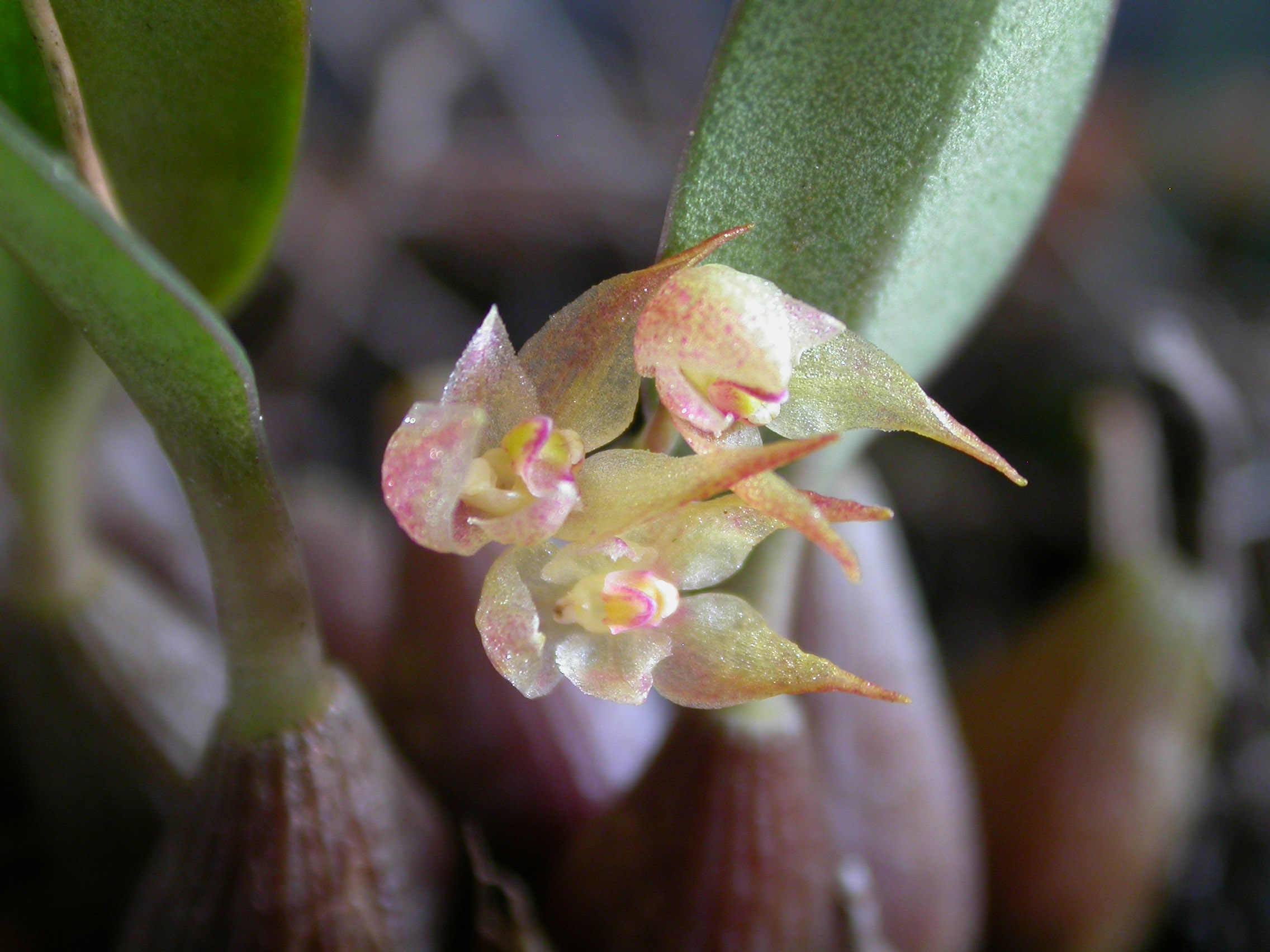

Scientific classification
- Kingdom: Plantae
- Clade: Tracheophytes
- Clade: Angiosperms
- Clade: Monocots
- Order: Asparagales
- Family: Orchidaceae
- Subfamily: Epidendroideae
- Genus: Bulbophyllum
- Species: B. scabratum

Binomial name
- Bulbophyllum scabratum Rchb. f. 1861

Synonyms
- Bulbophyllum confertum Hook.f. 1890; Bulbophyllum insulsum (Gagnep.) Seidenf. 1973 publ. 1974; Bulbophyllum levinei Schltr. 1924; Bulbophyllum lockii Aver. & Averyanova 2006; Bulbophyllum psychoon Rchb.f. 1878; Cirrhopetalum insulsum Gagnep. 1950; Phyllorkis conferta (Hook.f.) Kuntze 1891; Phyllorkis psychoon (Rchb.f.) Kuntze 1891

= Bulbophyllum scabratum =

Species of orchid

Bulbophyllum scabratum, butterfly egg Bulbophyllum, or Rough Bulb-Leaf Orchid is a species of orchid in the genus Bulbophyllum in section Eublepharon.

== Distribution ==
Plants are found in China (Hong Kong and Fujian, Guangdong, Guangxi, Hunan, Jiangxi, Yunnan and Zhejiang), Taiwan, Assam India, Bangladesh, Nepal, Bhutan, Sikkim, Vietnam, Laos and Thailand at elevations of 1000 to 2000 meters.
