= Bulbophyllum vietnamense =

Scientific classification
- Kingdom: Plantae
- Clade: Tracheophytes
- Clade: Angiosperms
- Clade: Monocots
- Order: Asparagales
- Family: Orchidaceae
- Subfamily: Epidendroideae
- Genus: Bulbophyllum
- Species: B. vietnamense

Binomial name
- Bulbophyllum vietnamense Seidenf. 1975

Synonyms
- Bulbophyllum dalatense Seidenf. 1973 publ. 1974; Cirrhopetalum sigaldii Guillaumin 1963

Species of orchid

Bulbophyllum vietnamense is a species of orchid in the genus Bulbophyllum found in Vietnam.
