= Lawrence E. Gilbert =

Lawrence Gilbert
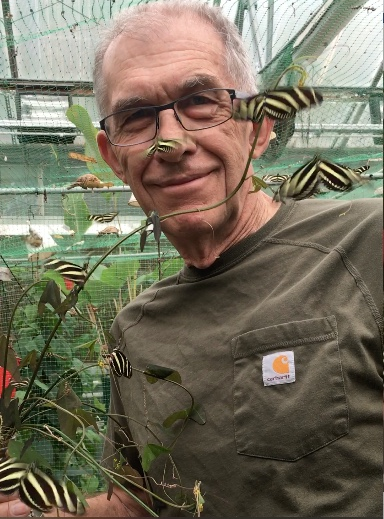
- Gilbert with Heliconius charithonia butterflies
- Known for: Gilbertian mimicry

Lawrence E. Gilbert (b. 1942) is an American biologist, known for his discovery of Gilbertian mimicry.

== Early life ==
Lawrence E. Gilbert was born in Laredo, Texas in 1942. His father was a Presbyterian minister. He grew up in different towns around Texas as his father moved between churches. He graduated from high school in West Columbia, Texas.

== Career ==
In 1966 he earned his B.A. in biology, specialising in botany at the University of Texas at Austin. He spent a year at the University of Oxford as a Fulbright Fellow. In 1971 he gained his Ph.D. in population biology at Stanford University. In that year he began his career as an assistant professor in zoology at the University of Texas at Austin. He became chair of the zoology department there in 1980. In 2009, Gilbert became professor of biology and director of the Brackenridge Field Laboratory at the University of Texas at Austin.

His research interests include the biological control of fire ants with flies of the Phoridae family, the evolutionary biology and ecology of the tropical genus Psiguria and Gurania (Cucurbitaceae), the moth Eudulaphasia invaria, insect and spider bites, the role of mesquite in the South Texas ecosystem, and the ecological interactions of butterflies of the genus Heliconius with passion flowers.

Gilbert, together with John M. MacDougal, described the passion flower Passiflora microstipula. MacDougal named another species in the same genus Passiflora gilbertiana after him.

== Gilbertian mimicry ==
Gilbert is known for his discovery of Gilbertian mimicry in Passiflora plants. This involves the plants growing small structures that resemble the eggs of Heliconius butterflies, whose caterpillars feed on Passiflora. Gilbert realised that the structures signal to egg-laying female Heliconius that the plant has already been occupied by another female, with the implication that the existing eggs will hatch first and consume the available food. Females have therefore evolved to avoid such plants, just as the plants have evolved to give a convincing signal. Gilbert described the mechanism as a "coevolved mutualism" in 1975. The biologist Georges Pasteur named the rare mimicry system after Gilbert.

== Personal life ==
Gilbert is married to the poet and artist Christine Mast. They have two sons.

== Major works ==
The following papers have each been cited over 450 times:

- 1972 "Pollen Feeding and Reproductive Biology of Heliconius Butterflies", PNAS
- 1975 "Butterfly Ecology" (with M.C. Singer), Annual Review of Ecology and Systematics
- 1975 "Ecological consequences of a coevolved mutualism between butterflies and plants", Coevolution of Animals and Plants (Symposium V)
- 1975 "Coevolution of plants and herbivores: passion flower butterflies" (with W.W. Benson and K.S. Brown jr), Evolution
- 1979 "Male contribution to egg production in butterflies: evidence for transfer of nutrients at mating", Science
- 1980 "Food web organization and conservation of neotropical diversity", CABI
