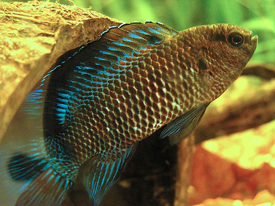

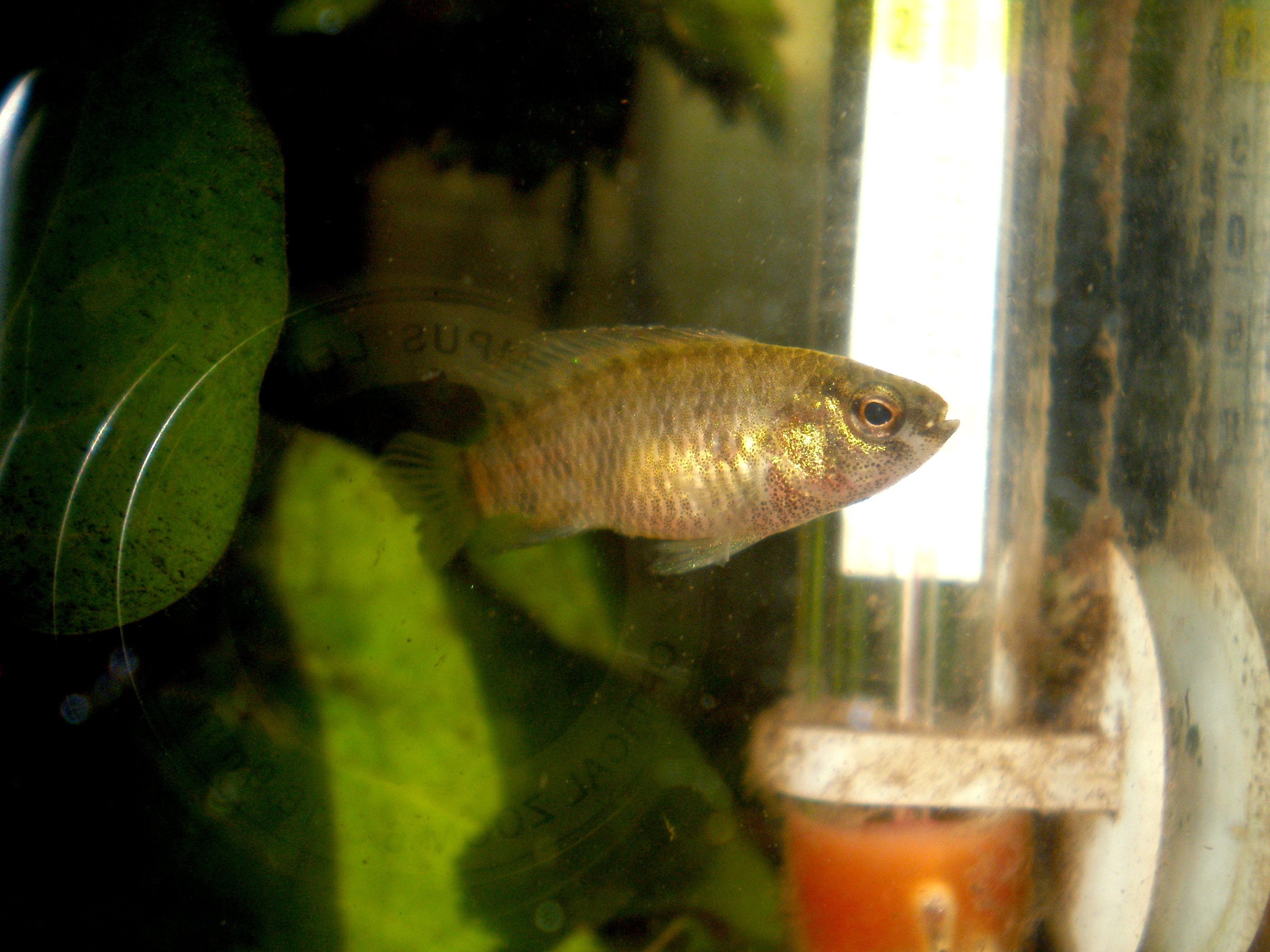
- male above, female below

Conservation status
- Least Concern (IUCN 3.1)

Scientific classification
- Kingdom: Animalia
- Phylum: Chordata
- Class: Actinopterygii
- Order: Anabantiformes
- Family: Badidae
- Genus: Badis
- Species: B. badis

Binomial name
- Badis badis (F. Hamilton, 1822)

Synonyms
- Labrus badis Hamilton, 1822; Labrus fasciata Swainson, 1839; Cychla fasciata (Swainson, 1839); Badis buchanani Bleeker, 1853

= Badis badis =

Species of fish

Badis badis, also known as the blue perch or blue badis, is a small species of Asian freshwater fish in the family Badidae of the order Anabantiformes. It is found in ponds, rivers, ditches and swamps in northern India, eastern Pakistan, Bangladesh, Bhutan and Nepal, including the Ganges, Brahmaputra, Mahanadi and Indus basins. It is sometimes kept as an aquarium fish. It is a small, predatory fish that feeds on tiny invertebrates. Maximum total length is around 8 cm (3 in). It is sexually dimorphic, with males growing larger and more colorful, especially when excited, compared to females. Adult males have blue fins and may display dark vertical bands on the flanks, while the smaller females display little color. Several similar relatives, now recognized as separate Badis species, have historically been confused with Badis badis. Historically the two genera that now make up the Badidae, Badis and Dario, were placed in the family Nandidae; this is no longer the case.
