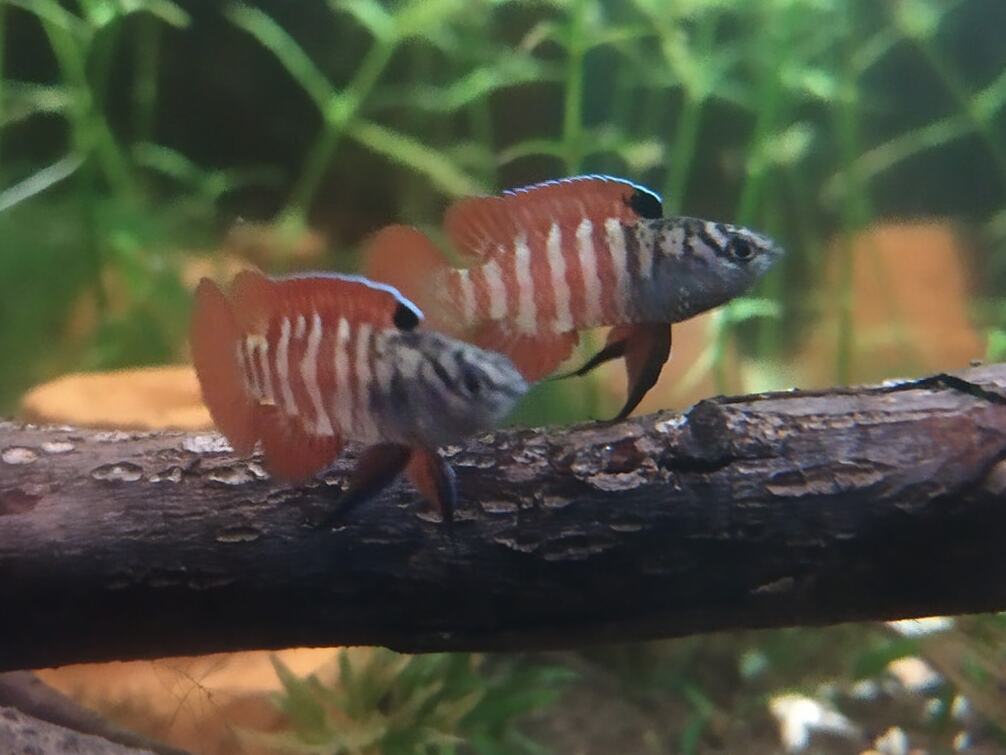
- Two male D. tigris sparring

Scientific classification
- Kingdom: Animalia
- Phylum: Chordata
- Class: Actinopterygii
- Order: Anabantiformes
- Family: Badidae
- Genus: Dario
- Species: D. tigris

Binomial name
- Dario tigris Britz, Kullander & Rüber, 2022

= Dario tigris =

Species of fish

Dario tigris is a small and attractive species of ray-finned fish in the family Badidae. A relative of the better-known scarlet badis (D. dario), it is found in shallow, slow-moving waters of northern Myanmar. It was originally believed to be a colour form of D. hysginon, but in 2022 it gained species status. It may be found in the aquarium trade.

== Distribution ==
D. tigris is probably endemic to northern Myanmar and possibly to the state of Kachin, close to the city of Myitkyina. A pair of males from separate localities were included in the type series of D. hysginon with details given as "stream about 1.5 km on road Myitzon-Myitkyina" and "ditch marginal to fish ponds about 40 km north of Myitkyina, on road to Myitzon".

== Habitat ==
No details are available regarding its habitat, but the possibly sympatric D. hysginon shows a marked preference for small, often murky pools with dense growths of aquatic plants or submerged grasses.

== Diet ==
Dario species are micropredators feeding on small aquatic crustaceans, worms, insect larvae and other zooplankton. In the aquarium hobby, it is advised to feed them a varied diet of Artemia nauplii, Daphnia, grindal, microworms, and banana worm.

== Breeding ==
D. tigris is a substrate spawner forming temporary pair bonds.

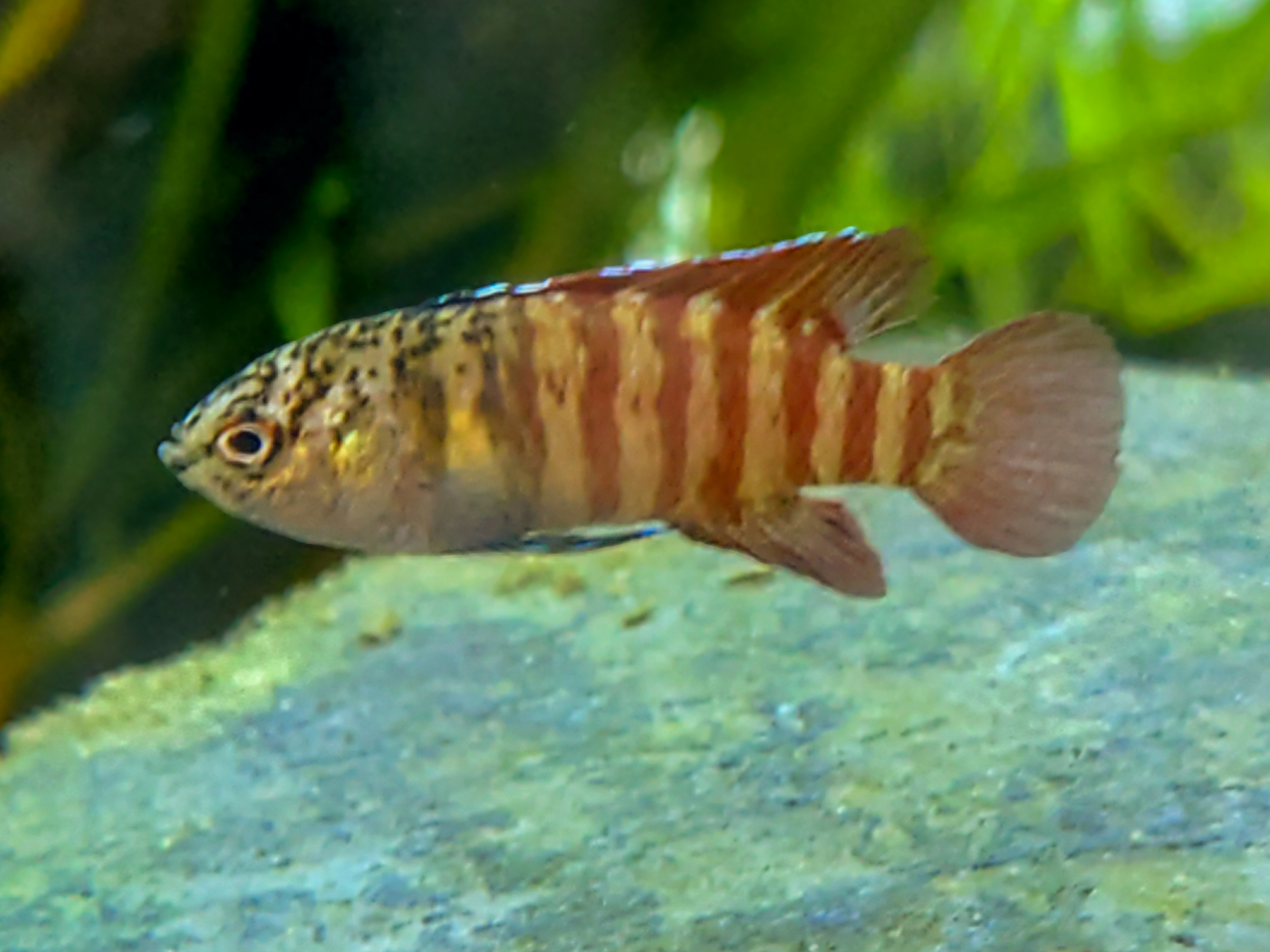
Female Dario tigris.
