= Asian leaffish =

Asian leaffish can refer to two families of tropical freshwater fish:

- Nandidae, a family found in both Asia and Africa
- Pristolepididae, a family found in Asia

== See also ==
- Polycentridae, South American leaffish
