= Dario dayingensis =

Scientific classification
- Kingdom: Animalia
- Phylum: Chordata
- Class: Actinopterygii
- Order: Anabantiformes
- Family: Badidae
- Genus: Dario
- Species: D. dayingensis

Binomial name
- Dario dayingensis Kullander & Britz, 2002

Species of fish

Dario dayingensis is a tropical freshwater fish native to Yunnan, China. The males of this species grow to a maximum of 2.2 cm (0.9 in) while the females grow to 2.1 cm (0.8 in). This species can be found in a small stream, wider than 2 m, about 30 cm deep, with relatively fast current, running through an open cultured area. Bottom composed of substrate rock, sand, leaf litter and mud. This species is called as Yingjiang chameleonfish (盈江变色龙) or Dayingjiang river dai-perch（大盈江黛鲈） in China. The Dario dayingensis is rare in China aquarium trade.
