= Dario melanogrammus =

Scientific classification
- Kingdom: Animalia
- Phylum: Chordata
- Class: Actinopterygii
- Order: Anabantiformes
- Family: Badidae
- Genus: Dario
- Species: D. melanogrammus

Binomial name
- Dario melanogrammus Britz, Kullander & Rüber, 2022

Species of fish

Dario melanogrammus is a freshwater species of ray-finned fish in the family Badidae. It was described in 2022 and the type locality is in Myanmar.
