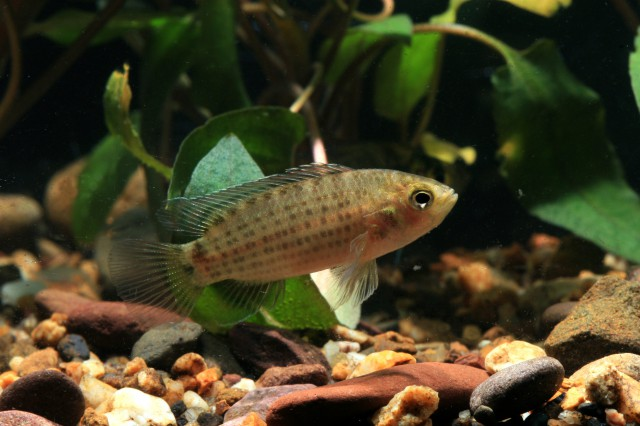

Conservation status
- Data Deficient (IUCN 3.1)

Scientific classification
- Kingdom: Animalia
- Phylum: Chordata
- Class: Actinopterygii
- Order: Anabantiformes
- Family: Badidae
- Genus: Badis
- Species: B. siamensis

Binomial name
- Badis siamensis Klausewitz, 1957

= Badis siamensis =

Species of freshwater fish

Badis siamensis is a species of freshwater ray-finned fish from the family found only in Thailand. This species grows to a length of 3.9 centimetres (1.5 in).
