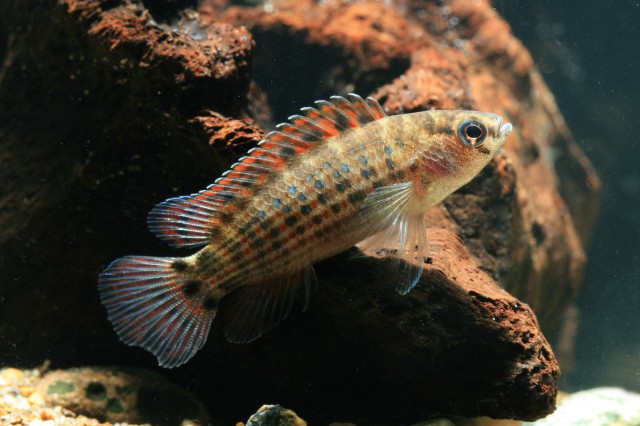

Conservation status
- Least Concern (IUCN 3.1)

Scientific classification
- Kingdom: Animalia
- Phylum: Chordata
- Class: Actinopterygii
- Order: Anabantiformes
- Family: Badidae
- Genus: Badis
- Species: B. ruber

Binomial name
- Badis ruber Schreitmüller, 1923

Synonyms
- Badis badis ssp. rubra var. Schreitmüller, 1923; Badis badis subsp. burmanicus Ahl in Arnold & Ahl, 1936

= Badis ruber =

Species of freshwater fish

Badis ruber is a species of freshwater ray-finned fish from the family Badidae. It is found in Mekong, Salween and Irrawaddy river basins of southeastern China, Laos and Thailand. This species grows to a length of 5.0 cm (2.0 in).
