= Leaf mimicry =

Form of camouflage

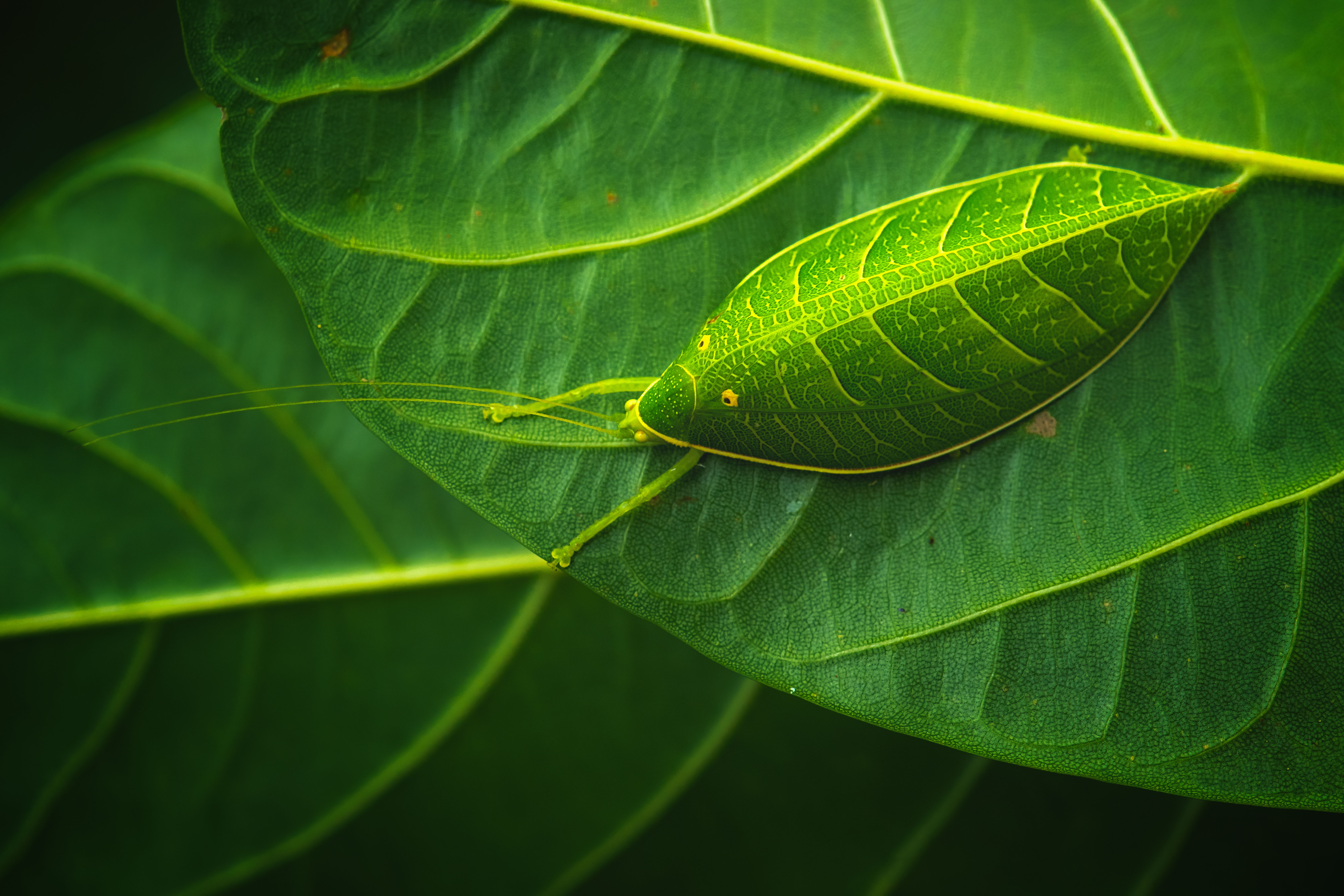
A leaf-mimicking katydid, Cratioma oculatum, of Southeast Asia

Leaf mimicry is the evolved resemblance of an organism to a leaf, a form of mimicry. This may serve directly as camouflage, or it may function as Batesian mimicry if the leaf model is distasteful; for example, if it has chemical defences. The mimicking organism can be a plant, such as the vine Boquila trifoliolata, or an animal. The vine senses and adopts different leaf shapes according to its surroundings. Among animals, many leaf mimics are insects, especially butterflies, katydids, and phasmids. Others are vertebrates, including leaffishes and toads. The mimicry, both in insects and among vertebrates, can involve behaviour as well as coloration and body shape.

Fossilised leaf-mimicking insects are known from the Jurassic of northeastern China, including both grigs and lacewings, and from a phasmid of the Eocene of Germany.

== In plants ==
Boquila trifoliolata, a South American member of the family Lardizabalaceae, is a climbing vine with a highly variable appearance (phenotype). It is capable of mimicking the leaf features, such as their coloration, size, and shape, of plant species that it clings to. By camouflaging its leaves, Boquila reduces damage from herbivorous animals. This is a form of Batesian mimicry, where B. trifoliolata is harmless but resembles a less palatable or harmful plant to ward off herbivory species and pests.

It has been speculated that such plants may make use of "some kind of vision" using ocelli, or "delicate chemical sensing", to account for the mimic's ability to cope with such a large number of variables in its model's appearance, including the ability to mimic the foliage of an artificial host plant made of plastic. Another plant that could well be a cryptic mimic of its host is the parasitic Australian mistletoe, Amyema cambagei, which has an "uncanny resemblance" to the foliage of Casuarina trees.

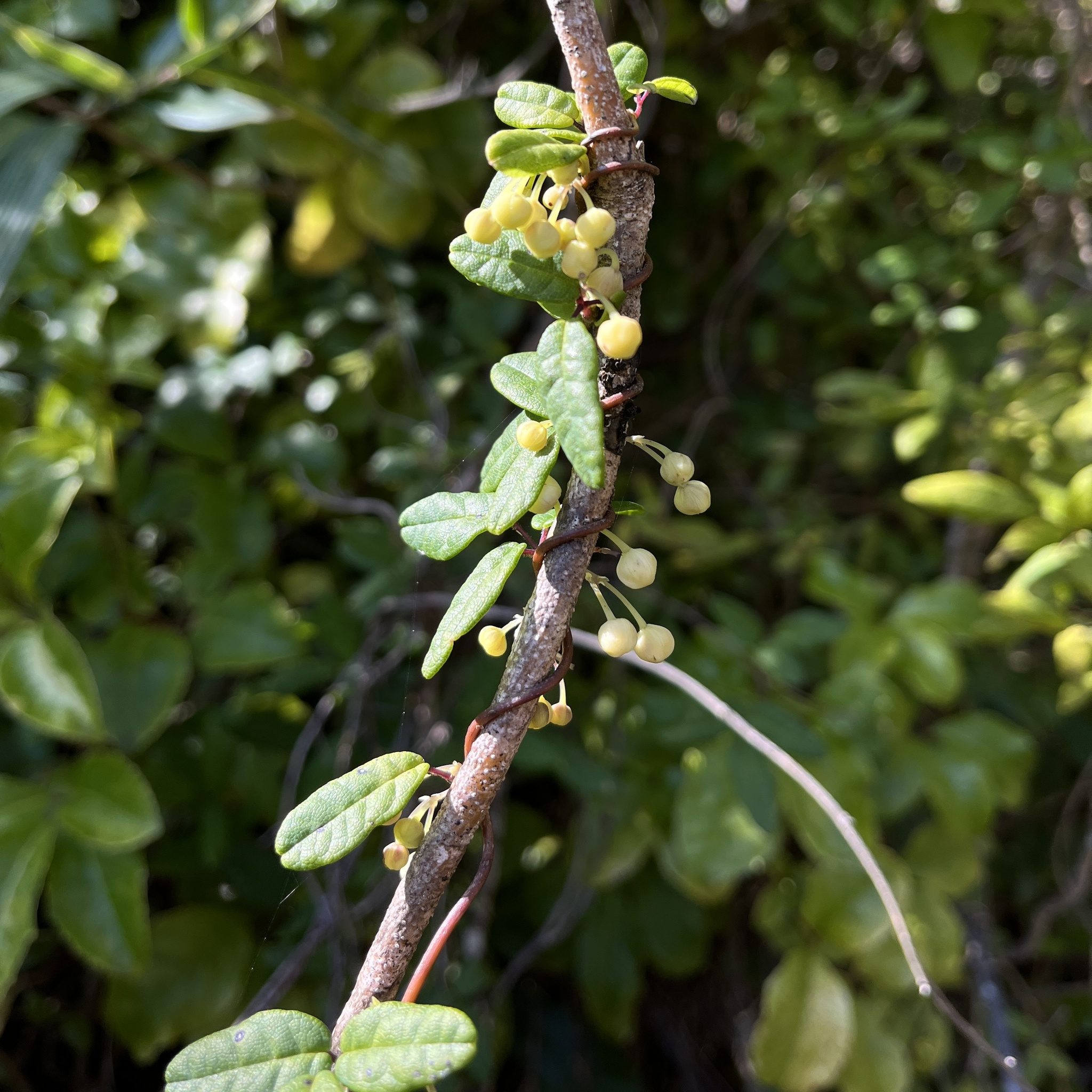
The climber Boquila trifoliolata hides from herbivores by varying its leaf shape to resemble the plant it is climbing on.

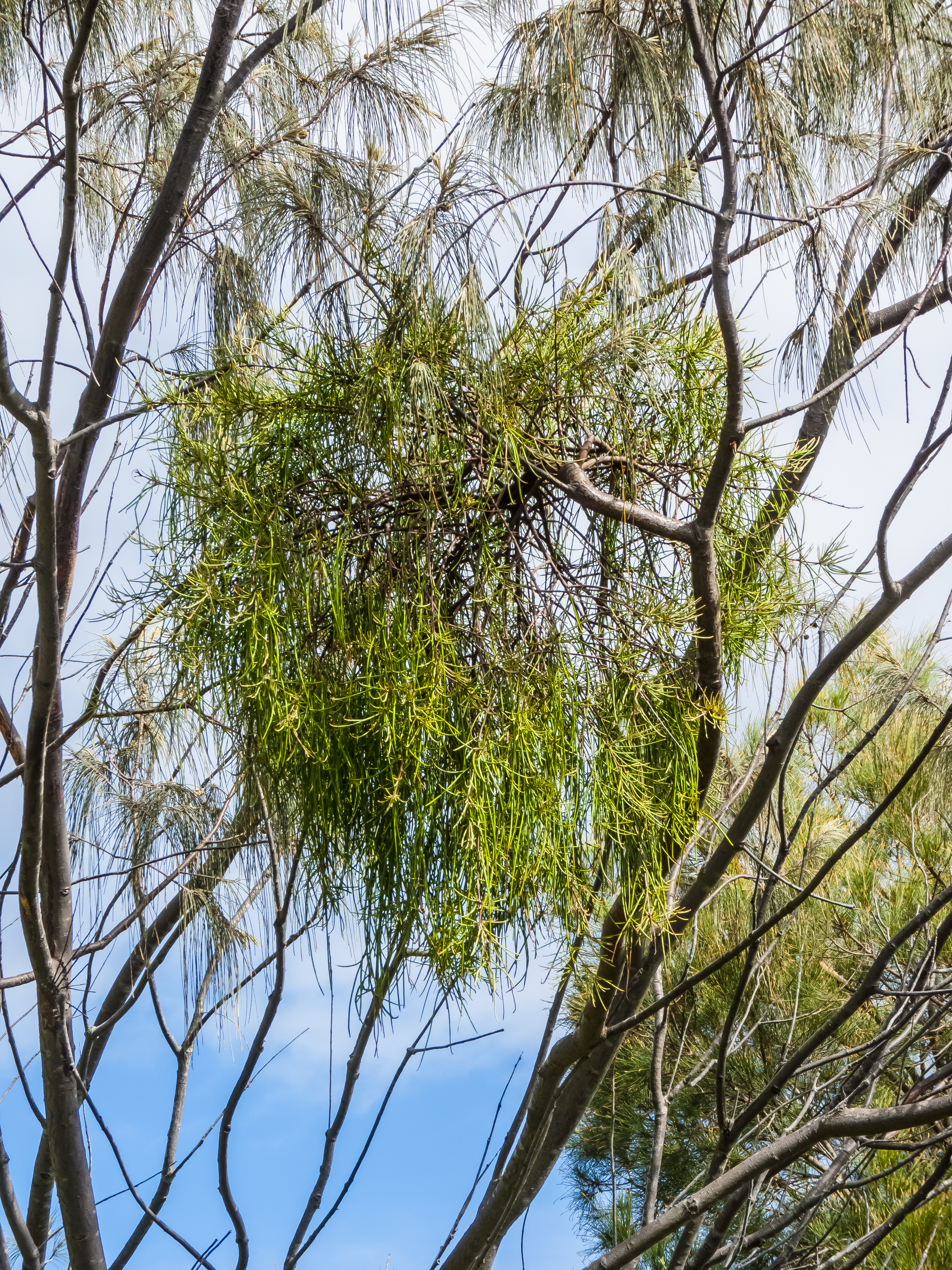
The leaves of the parasitic Amyema cambagei resemble those of its Casuarina host.

== In invertebrates ==
=== Insects ===
==== Fossil ====
A rare 47 million-year-old fossil of a phasmid leaf insect from Germany demonstrates that leaf mimicry existed in this group in the Eocene period. Among the orthoptera (grasshoppers and allies), fossil grigs (Prophalangopsidae) have been found in the Daohugou Biota of northeastern China, some 163.5 million years ago in the Jurassic period. Their forewings were patterned to resemble leaves of the cycad-like Bennettitales. Jurassic lacewings (Neuroptera) of the genus Bellinympha from the Jiulongshan Formation in the same region similarly have wings resembling pinnate cycad or Bennettitales leaves.

==== Extant ====
Many extant insects masquerade as leaves. Examples include moths and butterflies such as Kallima, many katydids, the leaf mantises such as Choeradodis, and the leaf insects (Phyllidae) among the phasmids. Mimicry is not limited to coloration; behaviour, such as lying still or apparently fluttering in the wind, contributes to the camouflaging effect. The English evolutionary zoologist Hugh Cott gives the example of Phyllium leaf insects which may hang from a leaf stalk by two or three legs, slowly turning "so as to suggest the motions of a leaf just ready to fall".

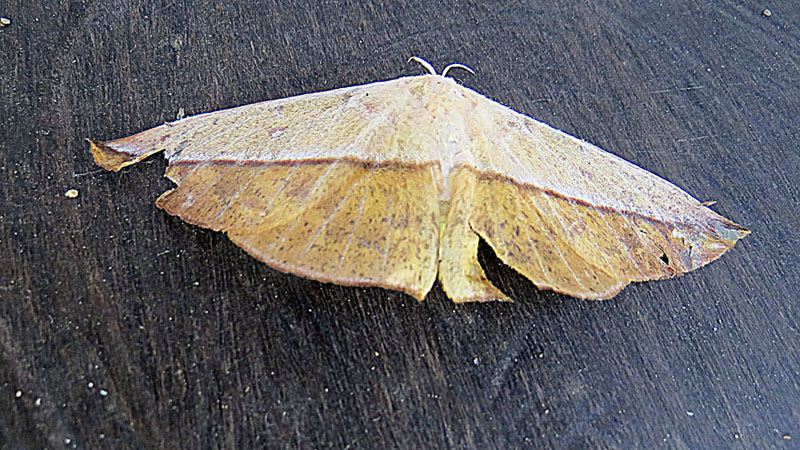
Moth Lonomia,
Colombian Amazon

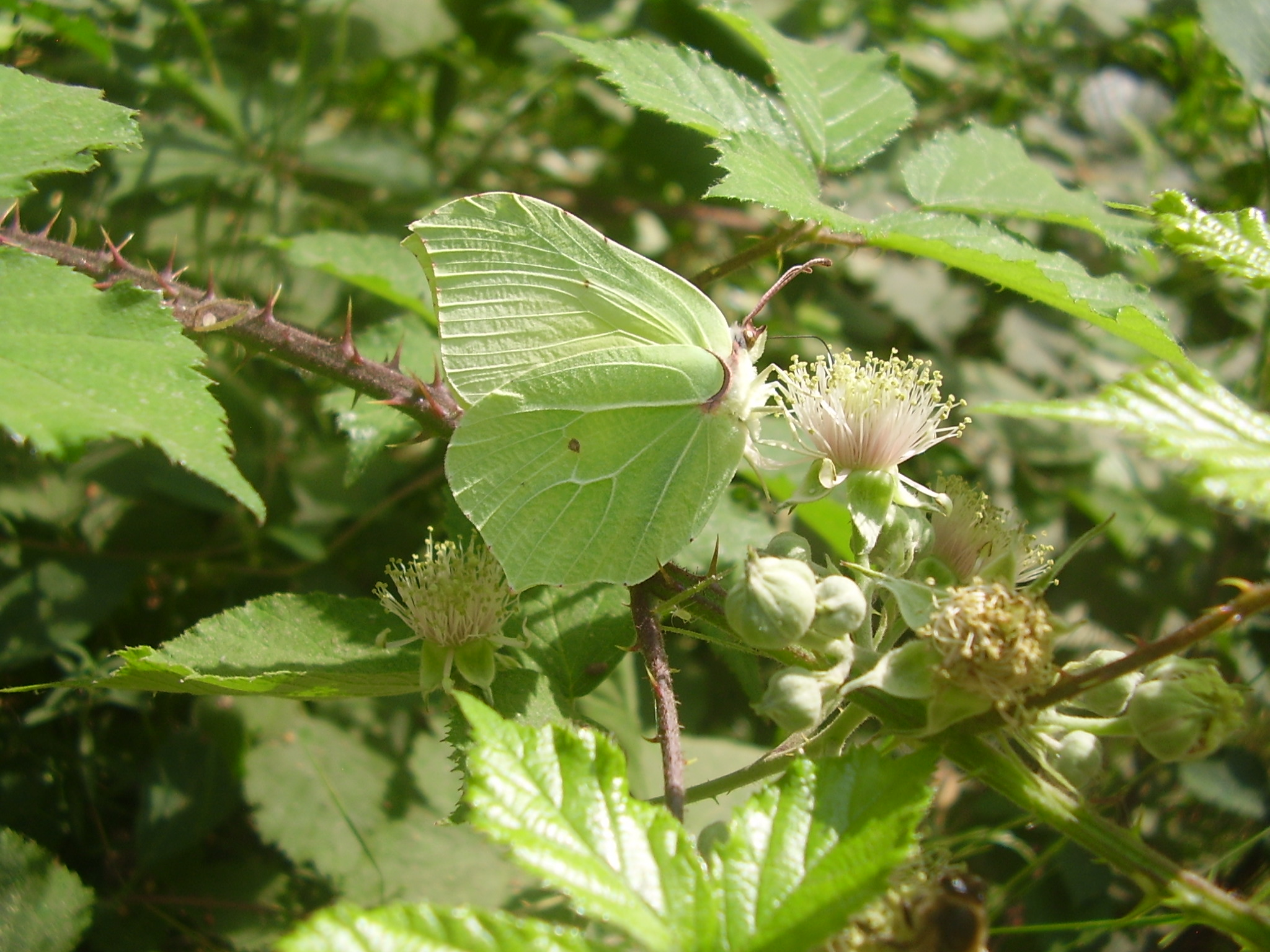
Butterfly Gonepteryx cleopatra,
Southern Europe

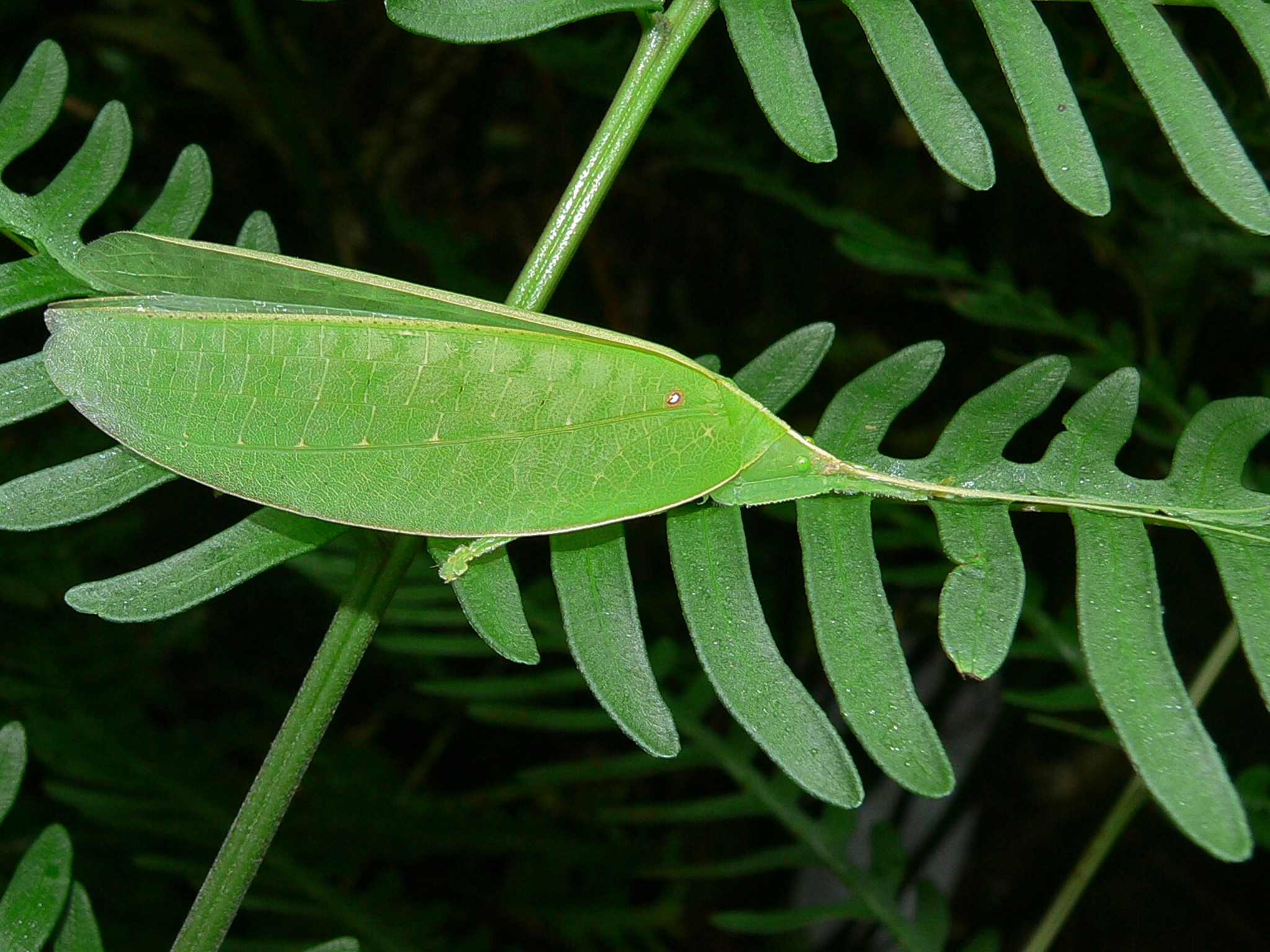
Katydid Pseudophyllus titan,
Asia

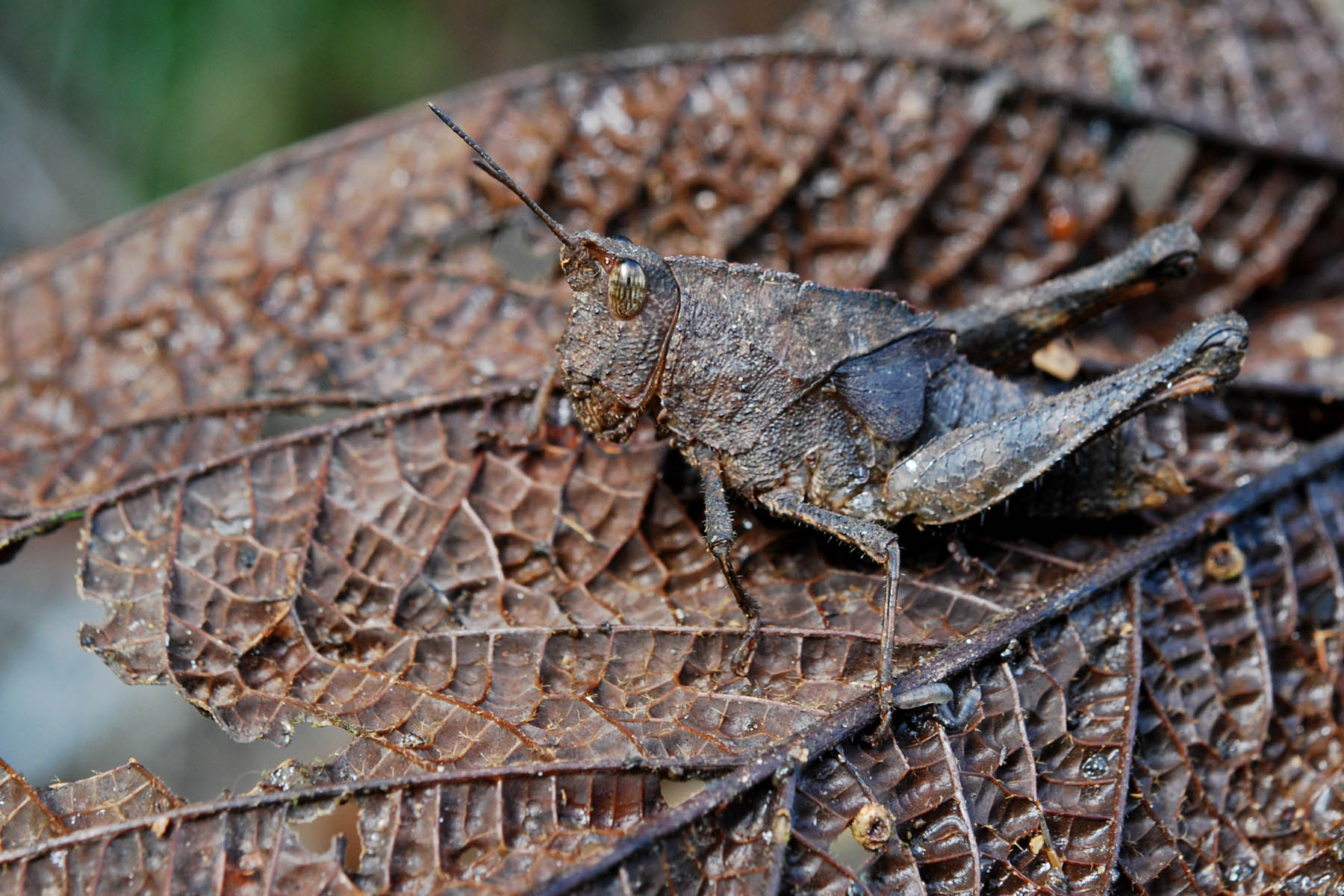
Grasshopper Colpolopha,
Ecuador

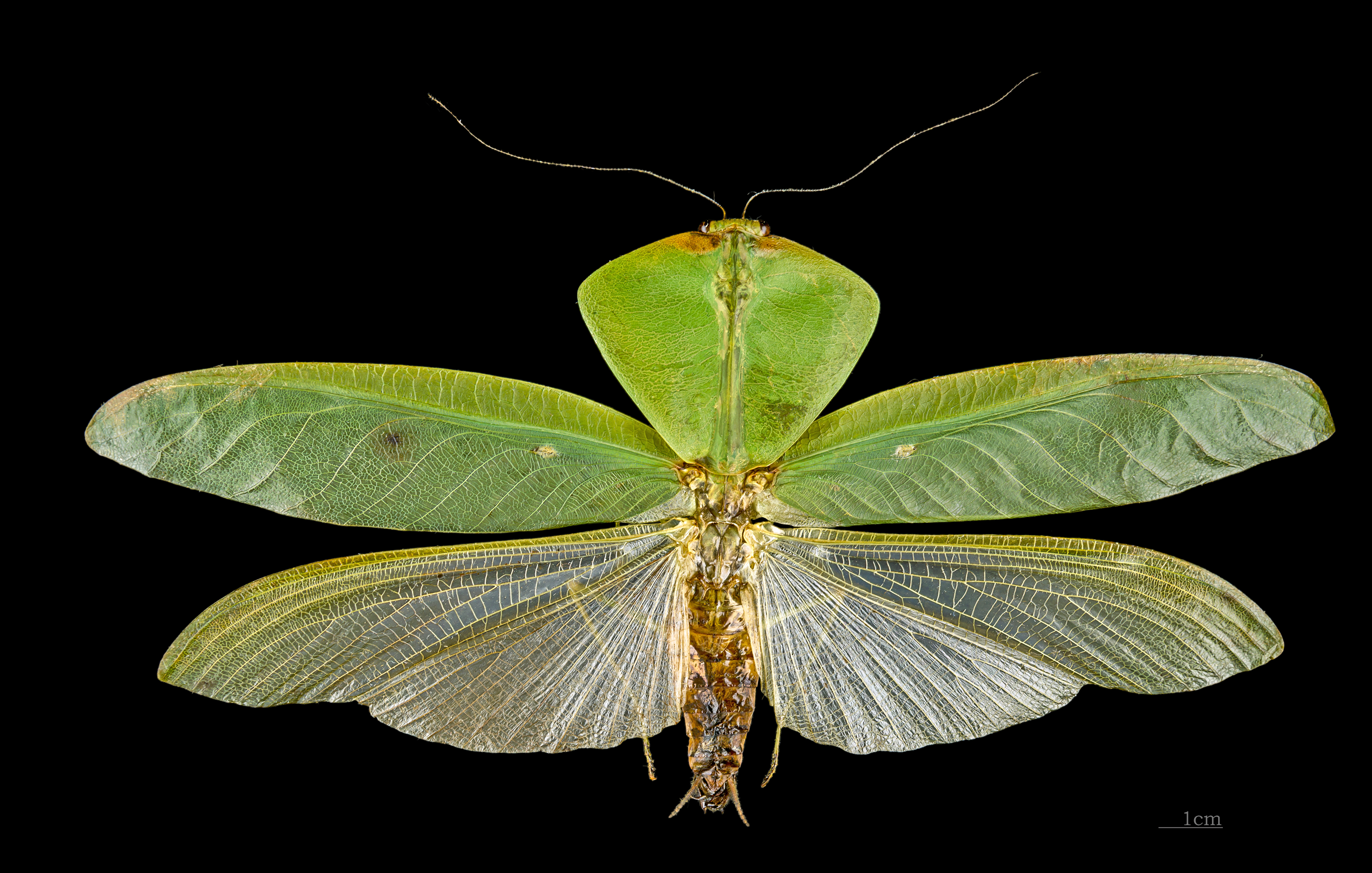
Leaf mantis Choeradodis stalii,
Central America

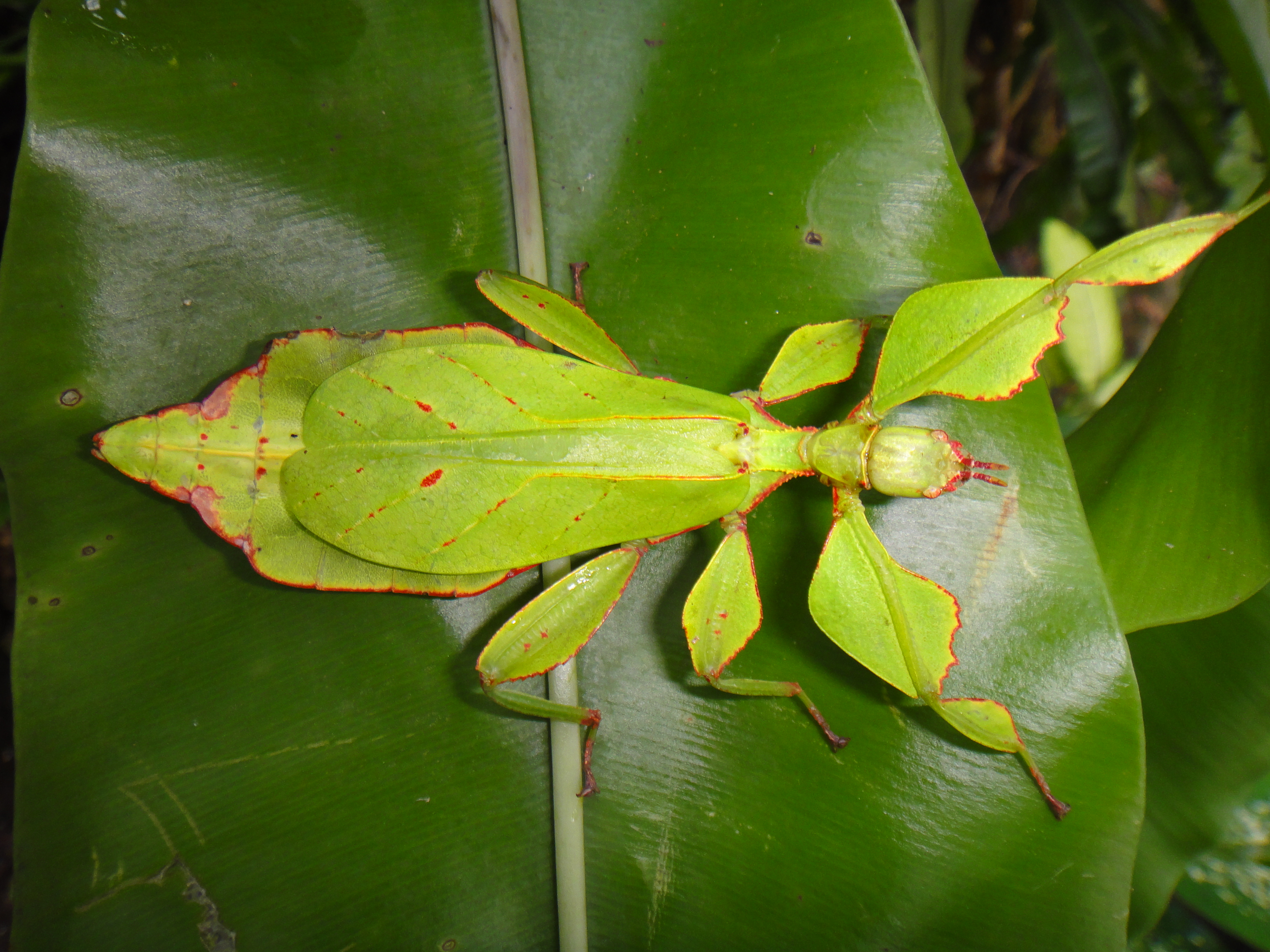
Phasmid Phyllium bonifacioi,
Philippines

==== Seasonal polyphenism ====
The comma butterfly of Europe has summer and winter forms (seasonal polyphenism). Insects in the darker winter form tend to roost on tree trunks, whereas the lighter summer form insects always roost on leaves. The two morphs appear to camouflage the insects well in the two seasons.

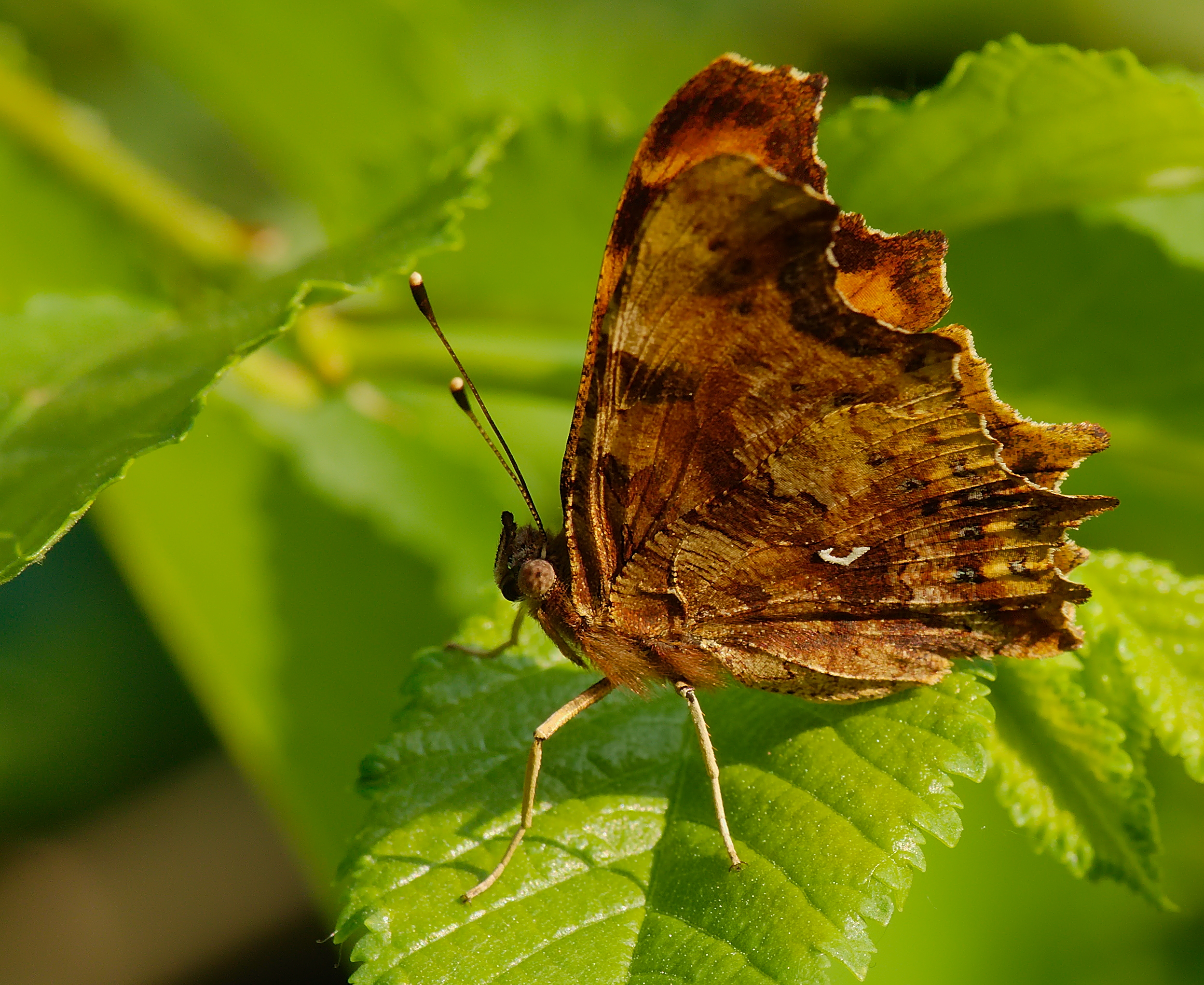
Comma butterfly in summer form, on a leaf

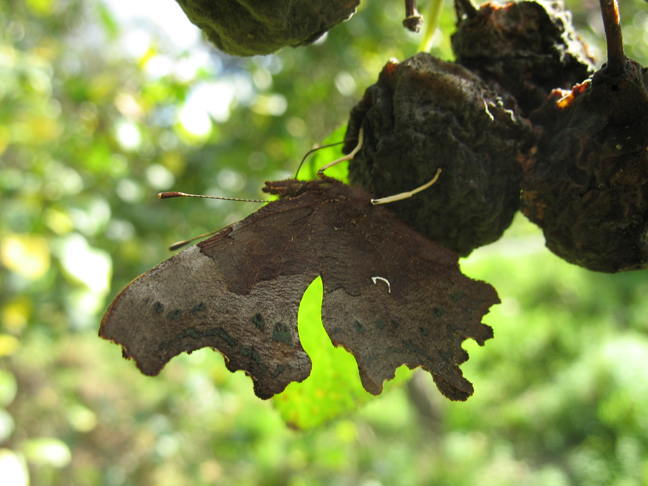
Comma butterfly in winter form, on dark woody perch

=== Spiders ===
The genus Poltys of orb-weaver spiders include a number of bark, twig and leaf mimics. One, found in 2011 in southwest China, is brownish-green, teardrop-shaped, and has stripes which resemble leaf veins. It does not spin a web but decorates a branch with dried leaves, among which it hides. As of 2016, the species has not been formally described nor assigned a scientific name.

== In vertebrates ==
Among the leaffishes (Polycentridae), the Amazon leaffish (Monocirrhus polyacanthus) strongly resembles a dead leaf, and has the habit of lying on its side without moving, often at an angle, and remains motionless even if caught in a net. It swims with its body rigid, undulating its very narrow anal and dorsal fins, which according to Hugh Cott are "colourless and transparent, and so practically invisible". The species is carnivorous, using its mimicry to approach its prey before engulfing it in its large jaws. Cott describes this form of mimicry as "special aggressive resemblance".

An Amazon species of toad, Rhinella margaritifera, has, according to Cott, "quite an extraordinary resemblance to a leaf." The small chameleon of the Congo, Rhampholeon boulengeri, mimics a leaf with its coloration and its extremely flattened body shape.

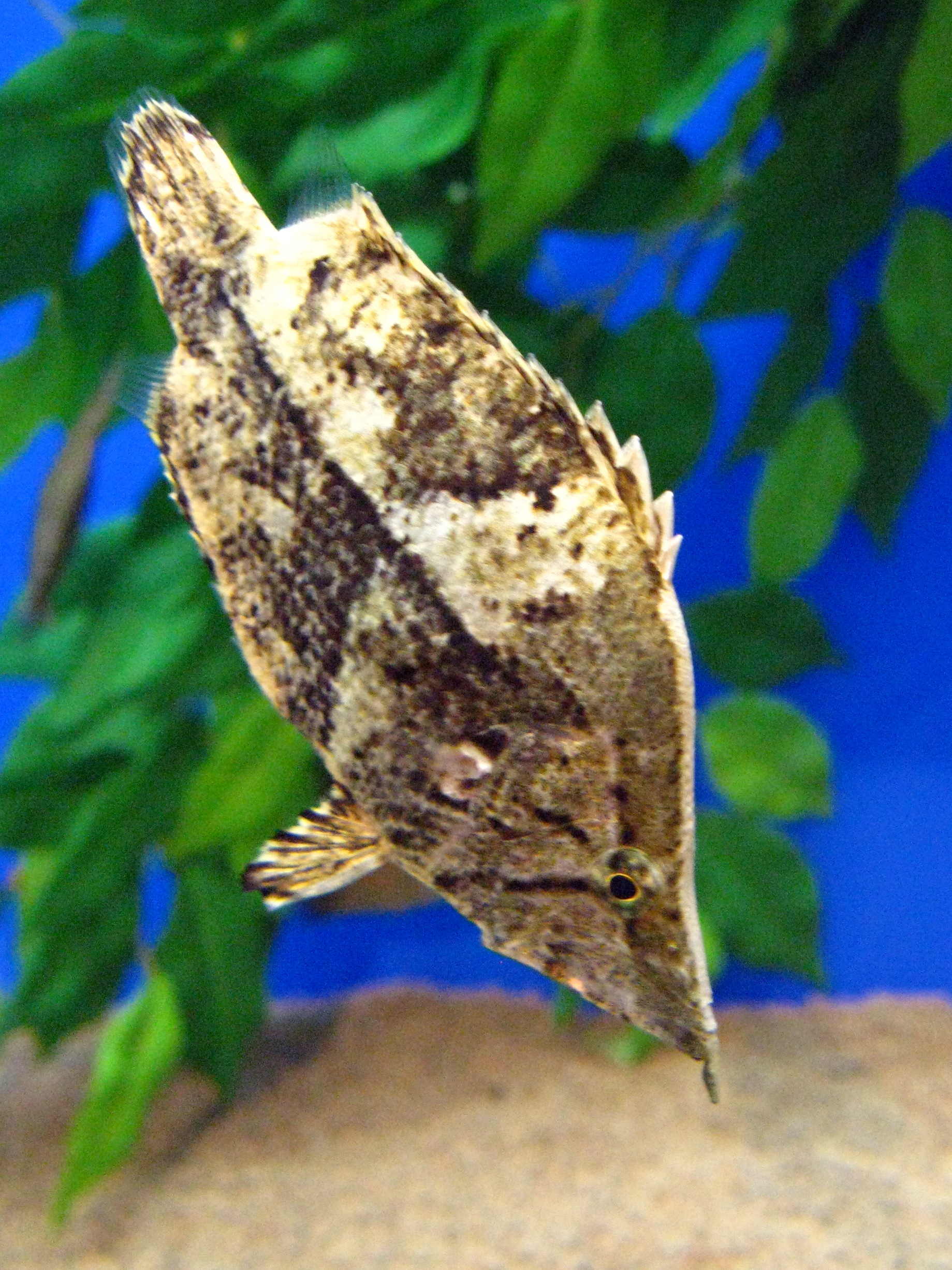
Amazon leaffish keeping still in its characteristic dead-leaf position

== Sources ==
- Baluška, František; Mancuso, Stefano (29 March 2021). "Individuality, self and sociality of vascular plants". Philosophical Transactions of the Royal Society B: Biological Sciences. 376 (1821) 20190760. doi:10.1098/rstb.2019.0760. PMC 7934911. PMID 33550947.
- Cott, Hugh B. (1940). Adaptive Coloration in Animals. Methuen.
- Gianoli, Ernesto; Carrasco-Urra, Fernando (5 May 2014). "Leaf Mimicry in a Climbing Plant Protects against Herbivory". Current Biology. 24 (9): 984–987. doi:10.1016/j.cub.2014.03.010. hdl:10533/129445. PMID 24768053.
- Pannell, John R.; Farmer, Edward E. (12 September 2016). "Mimicry in plants". Current Biology. 26 (17): R784–R785. doi:10.1016/j.cub.2016.04.005. PMID 27623255.
- White, Jacob; Yamashita, Felipe (31 December 2022). "Boquila trifoliolata mimics leaves of an artificial plastic host plant". Plant Signaling & Behavior. 17 (1). doi:10.1080/15592324.2021.1977530. PMC 8903786. PMID 34545774.
