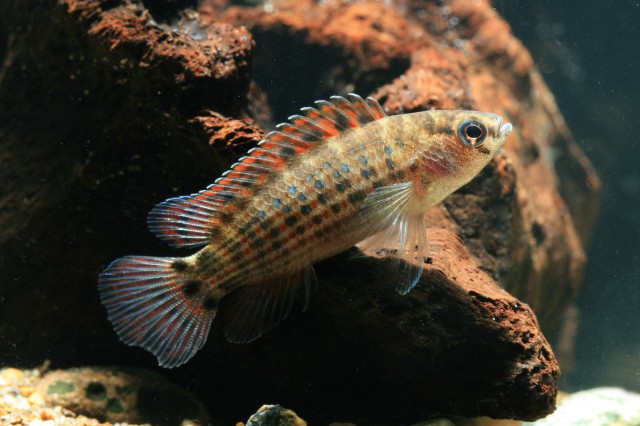
- Badis ruber

Scientific classification
- Kingdom: Animalia
- Phylum: Chordata
- Class: Actinopterygii
- Order: Anabantiformes
- Family: Badidae
- Genus: Badis; Bleeker, 1854

Type species
- Badis buchanani Bleeker, 1853

= Badis (fish) =

Genus of fishes

Badis is a genus of freshwater fish in the family Badidae found in South Asia, Southeast Asia and China. These species have a sharp spine on the opercle, soft and spinous parts of the dorsal fin contiguous, three spines in the anal fin, tubed pores in the lateral line, villiform teeth and a rounded caudal fin. In addition, they differ from the related genus Dario by being larger and displaying more involved parental care.

== Species ==
There are currently 28 recognized species in this genus, but a comprehensive taxonomic review is necessary as some of the described species are inseparable based on available data.

- Badis andrewraoi Valdesalici & van der Voort, 2015
- Badis assamensis C. G. E. Ahl, 1937
- Badis autumnum Valdesalici & van der Voort, 2015
- Badis badis (F. Hamilton, 1822)
- Badis blosyrus S. O. Kullander & Britz, 2002
- Badis britzi Dahanukar, Kumkar, U. Katwate & Raghavan, 2015
- Badis chittagongis S. O. Kullander & Britz, 2002
- Badis corycaeus S. O. Kullander & Britz, 2002
- Badis dibruensis Geetakumari & Vishwanath, 2010
- Badis ferrarisi S. O. Kullander & Britz, 2002
- Badis juergenschmidti I. Schindler & Linke, 2010
- Badis kaladanensis Ramliana L, Lalronunga S, Singh M (2021)
- Badis kanabos S. O. Kullander & Britz, 2002
- Badis khwae S. O. Kullander & Britz, 2002
- Badis kyanos Valdesalici & van der Voort, 2015
- Badis kyar S. O. Kullander & Britz, 2002
- Badis laspiophilus Valdesalici & van der Voort, 2015
- Badis limaakumi J. Praveenraj, 2023
- Badis pallidus S. O. Kullander, Nóren, Rahman & Mollah, 2019
- Badis pancharatnaensis Basumatary, Choudhury, Baishya, Sarma & Vishwanath, 2016
- Badis pyema S. O. Kullander & Britz, 2002
- Badis rhabdotus S. O. Kullander, Nóren, Rahman & Mollah, 2019
- Badis ruber Schreitmüller, 1923
- Badis siamensis Klausewitz, 1957
- Badis singenensis Geetakumari & Kadu, 2011
- Badis soraya Valdesalici & van der Voort, 2015
- Badis triocellus Khynriam & Sen, 2013
- Badis tuivaiei Vishwanath & Shanta, 2004
