= Badis chittagongis =

Conservation status
- Data Deficient (IUCN 3.1)

Scientific classification
- Kingdom: Animalia
- Phylum: Chordata
- Class: Actinopterygii
- Division: Teleostei
- Order: Anabantiformes
- Family: Badidae
- Genus: Badis
- Species: B. chittagongis

Binomial name
- Badis chittagongis Kullander & Britz, 2002

Species of fish

Badis chittagongis a freshwater fish belonging to the family Badidae, native to Bangladesh. It was described by Sven O. Kullander and Ralf Britz in 2002.

== Description ==
Badis chittagongis is a moderately elongate, laterally compressed fish. It has 16–18 dorsal spines, 9–11 dorsal soft rays, 6–9 anal soft rays, and 28–29 vertebrae. Body depth is 29.8–34.0% of standard length, while interorbital width is 5.5–6.7% of standard length. The head has a dark blotch on the superficial part of the cleithrum above the pectoral fin base. Several dark blotches occur along the middle of the dorsal fin. The orbit lies in the anterior half of the head at the level of the body's mid-axis. The jaws are nearly equal anteriorly, with the lower jaw only slightly projecting beyond the upper; the maxilla extends slightly behind the vertical through the anterior margin of the orbit. It has a strong opercular bone and well-developed tooth patches.

== Habitat and distribution ==
Badis chittagongis is found only in hill streams near the Chittagong District, Bangladesh. It is distributed in small streams on Maheshkhali Island and in small coastal streams draining to the Bay of Bengal from near Cox's Bazar to Teknaf.
