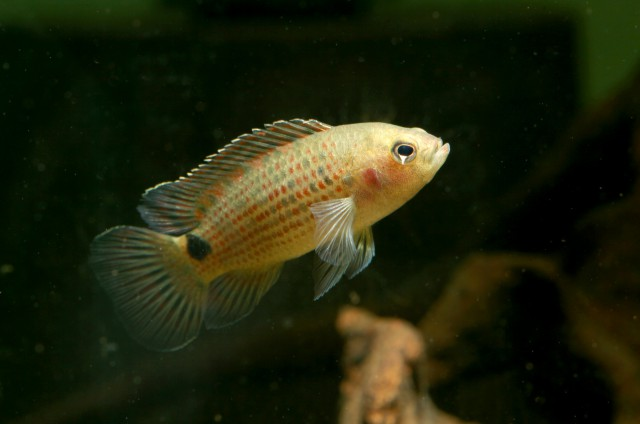

Conservation status
- Least Concern (IUCN 3.1)

Scientific classification
- Kingdom: Animalia
- Phylum: Chordata
- Class: Actinopterygii
- Order: Anabantiformes
- Family: Badidae
- Genus: Badis
- Species: B. khwae

Binomial name
- Badis khwae S. O. Kullander & Britz, 2002

= Badis khwae =

Species of freshwater fish

Badis khwae is a species of freshwater ray-finned fish from the chameleonfish family: Badidae that is native to Thailand. First described in 2002 (together with 9 other species), this species grows to a length of 2.9 cm (1.1 in).
