= Badis limaakumi =

Scientific classification
- Kingdom: Animalia
- Phylum: Chordata
- Class: Actinopterygii
- Division: Teleostei
- Order: Anabantiformes
- Family: Badidae
- Genus: Badis
- Species: B. limaakumi

Binomial name
- Badis limaakumi Praveenraj, 2023

Species of freshwater fish

Badis limaakumi is a species of freshwater ray-finned fish from the family Badidae. It is endemic to Milak river of Nagaland, India. B. limaakumi is locally known as Tepdang, Akngashi, Aokngatsu, or Sempi. This species has the ability to change its color when it is transferred to an aquarium from its natural habitat, where it is normally black in color. The common name of this fish's family "chameleon fishes" is due to this color changing ability of these fishes.
