= Nandus oxyrhynchus =

Conservation status
- Least Concern (IUCN 3.1)

Scientific classification
- Kingdom: Animalia
- Phylum: Chordata
- Class: Actinopterygii
- Order: Anabantiformes
- Family: Nandidae
- Genus: Nandus
- Species: N. oxyrhynchus

Binomial name
- Nandus oxyrhynchus Ng, Vidthayanon & Ng, 1996

Species of fish

Nandus oxyrhynchus is a species of ray-finned fish from the family Nandidae. It is native to the Mekong River Basin, Chao Phraya River Basin, and Mae Klong River Basin. It occurs in slow flowing and still waters in streams, rivers, pond and lakes. It is a carnivorous fish preying on other fishes and larger invertebrates.
