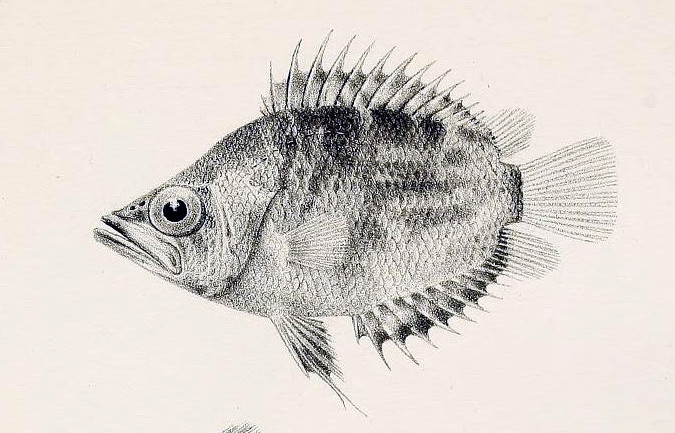

Conservation status
- Least Concern (IUCN 3.1)

Scientific classification
- Kingdom: Animalia
- Phylum: Chordata
- Class: Actinopterygii
- Order: Cichliformes
- Family: Polycentridae
- Genus: Polycentropsis; Boulenger, 1901
- Species: P. abbreviata

Binomial name
- Polycentropsis abbreviata Boulenger, 1901

= African leaffish =

Species of ray-finned fish

the African leaffish (Polycentropsis abbreviata) is a species of African leaffish native to fresh waters of western Africa. Although placed in the family Nandidae by the 5th Edition of Fishes of the World many recent authorities place Polycentropsis in Polycentridae.

This species grows to a length of 8 cm (3.1 in) TL. It can also be found in the aquarium trade. This species is the only known member of its genus, Polycentropsis .
