= Dario hysginon =

Conservation status
- Least Concern (IUCN 3.1)

Scientific classification
- Kingdom: Animalia
- Phylum: Chordata
- Class: Actinopterygii
- Order: Anabantiformes
- Family: Badidae
- Genus: Dario
- Species: D. hysginon

Binomial name
- Dario hysginon Kullander & Britz, 2002

Species of fish

Dario hysginon is a tropical freshwater fish native to Southeast Asia; in the countries of India, Myanmar, and Bengal. Hysginon means "scarlet" or "red dye" in Ancient Greek which has been classified to the genus Dario because of its red appearance.

They can grow about 2–4 cm, and they have dorsal fins that contain 14 – 15 spines, and 5 – 7 soft rays.

D. hysginons are generally peaceful fish, and can live for 3 – 6 years. Sven O. Kullander and Ralf Britz have added many species of fish to FishBase and gave D. hysginon a Swedish name, "Purpurbadis".

== Habitat ==
Dario hysginon live shallow areas with sand, pebbles, and dense vegetation such as grasses. In nature small crustaceans, worms, insect larvae, and zooplankton are the common food sources in their habitat.

== Aquarium life ==
=== Care ===
In captivity they enjoy frozen blood worms, daphnia, mysis, and brineshrimp.

Water Levels	Range
Temperature	71.6° - 78.8 °F
pH	6.3 - 7.5
Hardness	18 - 90 ppm

=== Breeding ===
Females lay around 60 eggs and they hatch 2 – 3 days.

They breed in warm waters, however breeding can cause males and females to become territorial, they can attack each other if they are in each other's territories and sometimes they feed on their offspring.

=== Sex ===
There are a few ways to classify the sexes;

1. Males usually grow to around 2 cm and females grow around 1.5 cm
2. Females have darker colors and males are more vibrant in color
3. Males have a black spot on their dorsal fin
