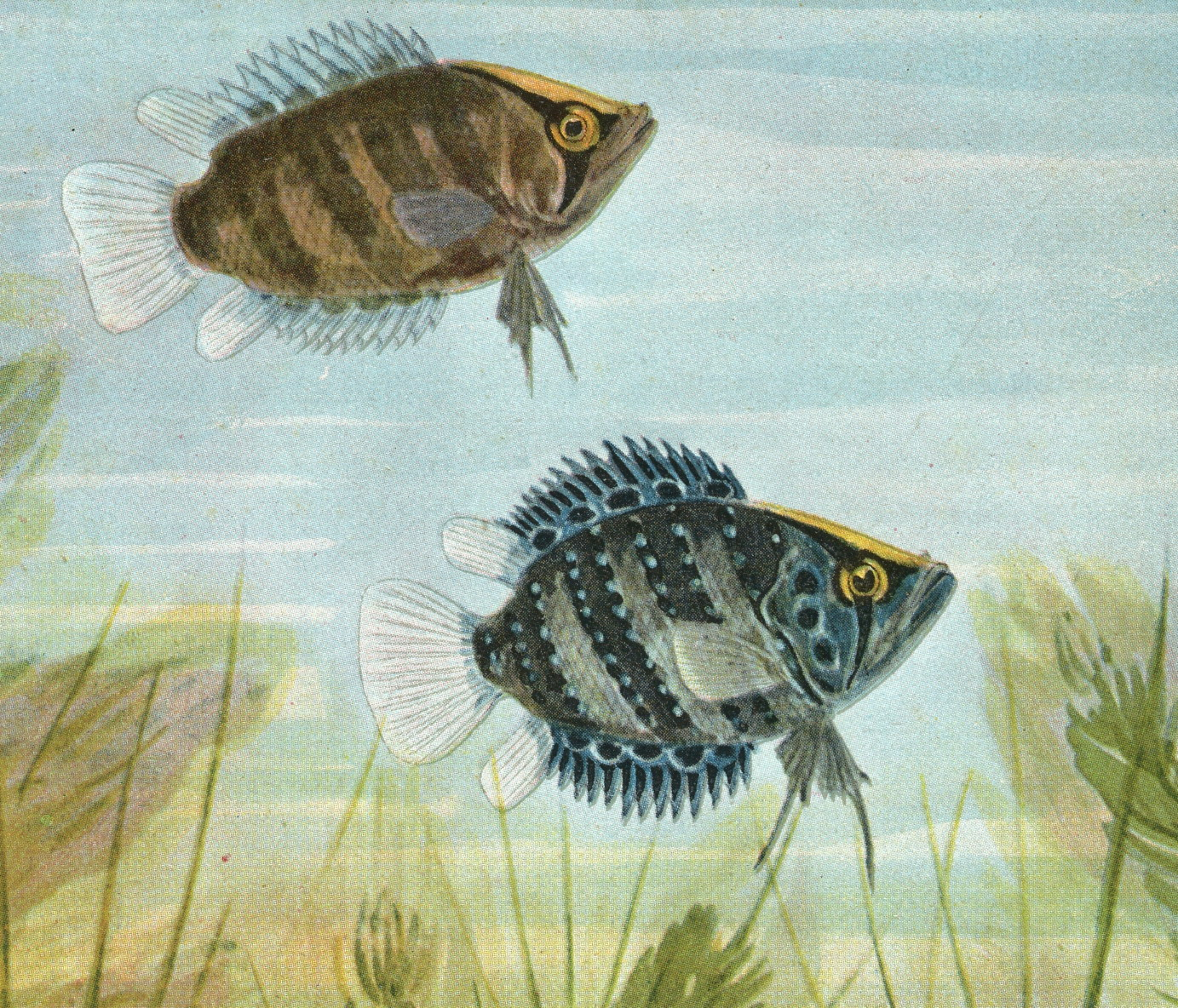
- Polycentrus schomburgkii Watercolor by Wilhelm Schreitmüller from 1924

Scientific classification
- Kingdom: Animalia
- Phylum: Chordata
- Class: Actinopterygii
- Order: Cichliformes
- Family: Polycentridae
- Genus: Polycentrus; Müller & Troschel, 1849

Type species
- Polycentrus schomburgkii Müller & Troschel, 1848

= Polycentrus =

Genus of fishes

Polycentrus is a genus of small fish belonging to the family Polycentridae. They are found in fresh and brackish water in northern South America and Trinidad.

== Species ==
There are currently 2 recognized species in this genus:

- Polycentrus jundia Coutinho & Wosiacki, 2014
- Polycentrus schomburgkii Müller & Troschel, 1849 (Guyana leaffish)
