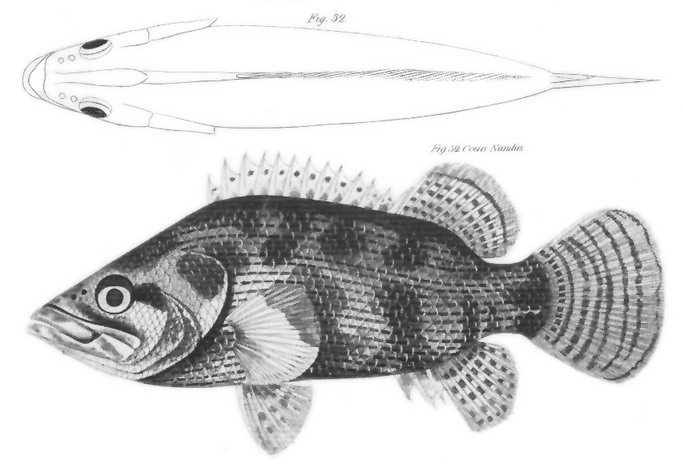
- An 1822 illustration of Nandus nandus
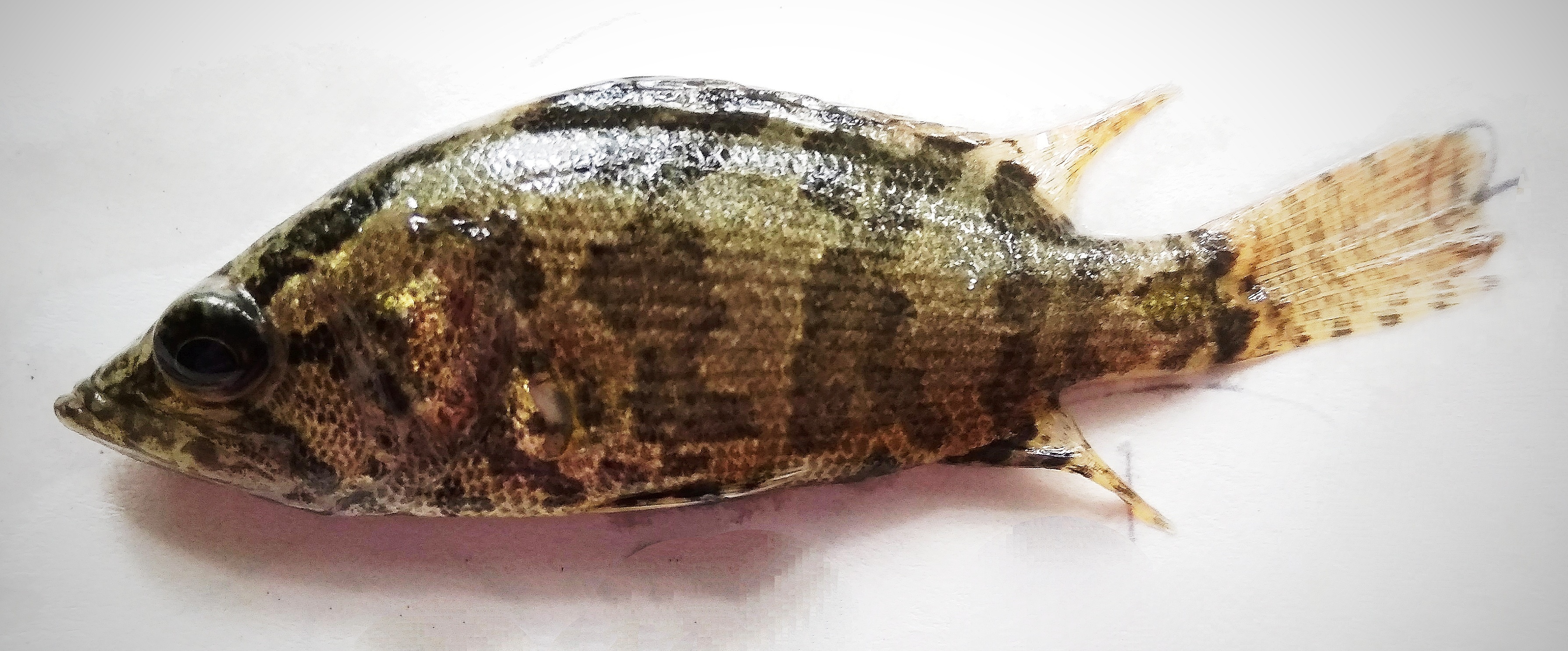
- A specimen caught from Assam, India

Conservation status
- Least Concern (IUCN 3.1)

Scientific classification
- Kingdom: Animalia
- Phylum: Chordata
- Class: Actinopterygii
- Order: Anabantiformes
- Family: Nandidae
- Genus: Nandus
- Species: N. nandus

Binomial name
- Nandus nandus (F. Hamilton, 1822)

Synonyms
- Bedula hamiltonii Gray, 1835; Coius nandus Hamilton, 1822; Nandus marmoratus Valenciennes, 1831

= Nandus nandus =

Gangetic leaffish

Species of fish

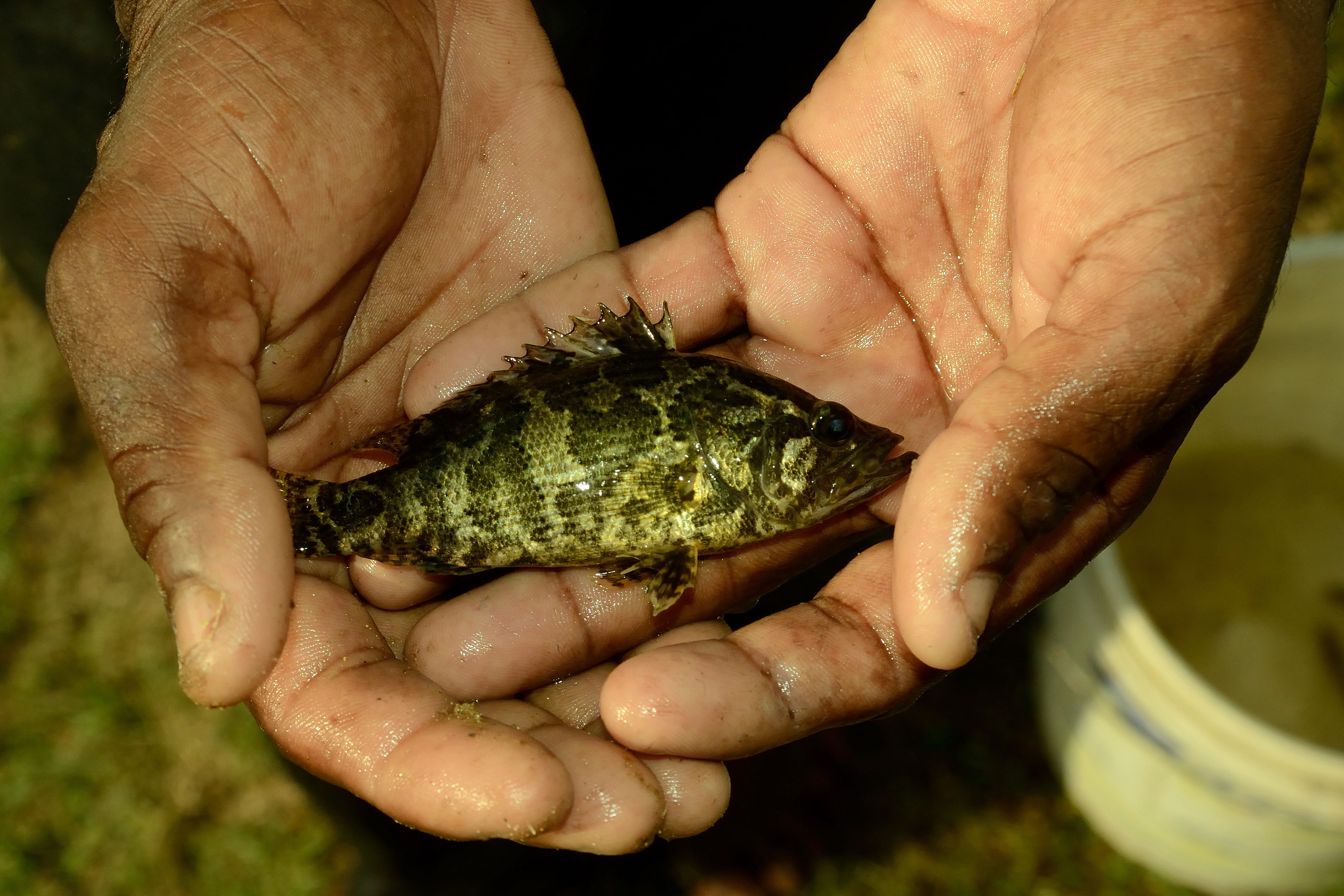
Captured by local fisherman at Pariej water tank (Anand District)

Nandus nandus, commonly known as the Gangetic leaffish, is a species of Asian leaffish native to South Asia and Indochina. They are common in slow-moving or stagnant bodies of water, including ponds, lakes, ditches, and flooded fields. Other common names of the species include mottled nandus and mud perch. They are commercially important and are highly prized as food fish. They are also caught for the aquarium trade.
