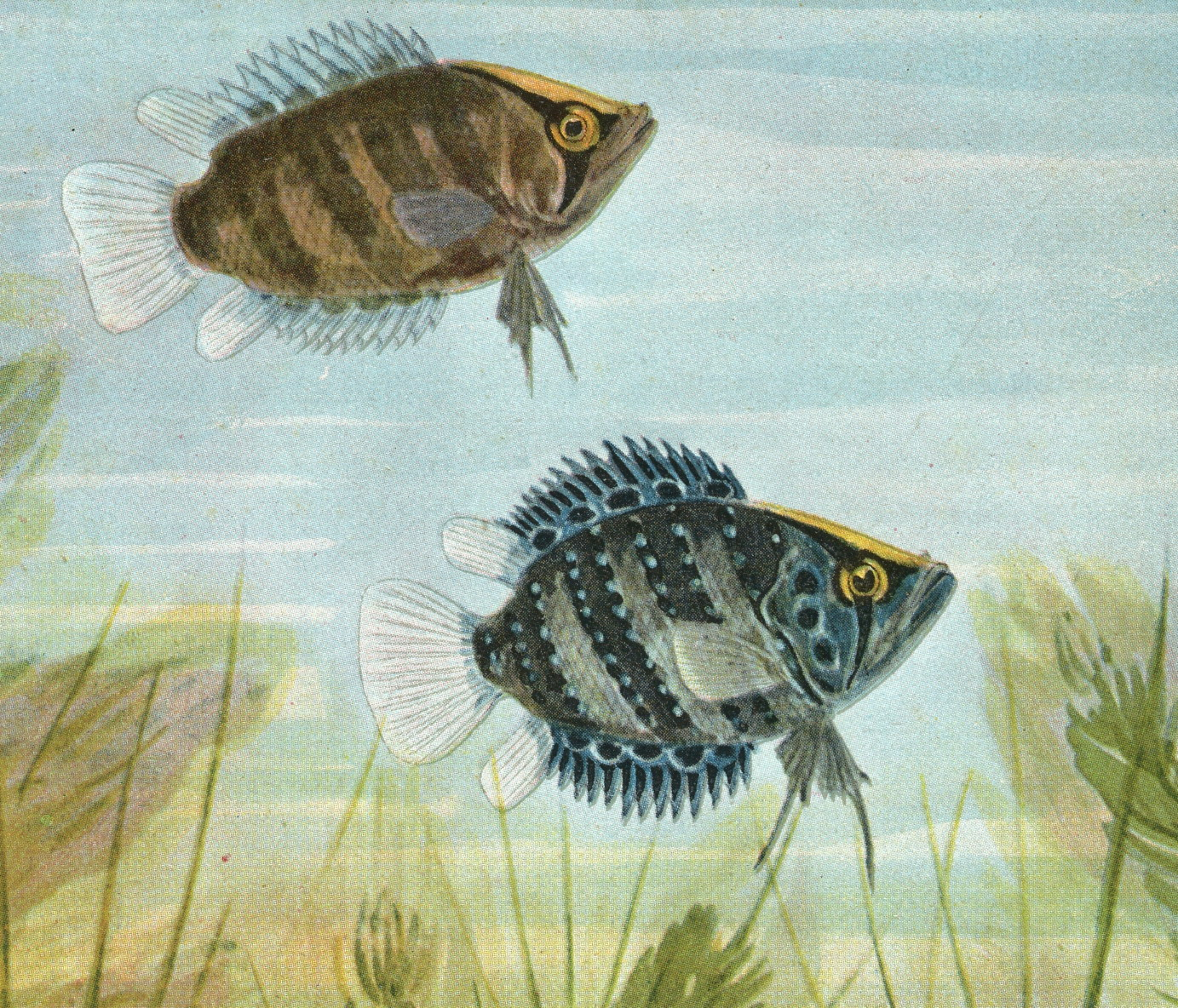
- Watercolor by Wilhelm Schreitmüller from 1924

Conservation status
- Least Concern (IUCN 3.1)

Scientific classification
- Kingdom: Animalia
- Phylum: Chordata
- Class: Actinopterygii
- Division: Teleostei
- Order: Cichliformes
- Family: Polycentridae
- Genus: Polycentrus
- Species: P. schomburgkii

Binomial name
- Polycentrus schomburgkii Müller & Troschel, 1849
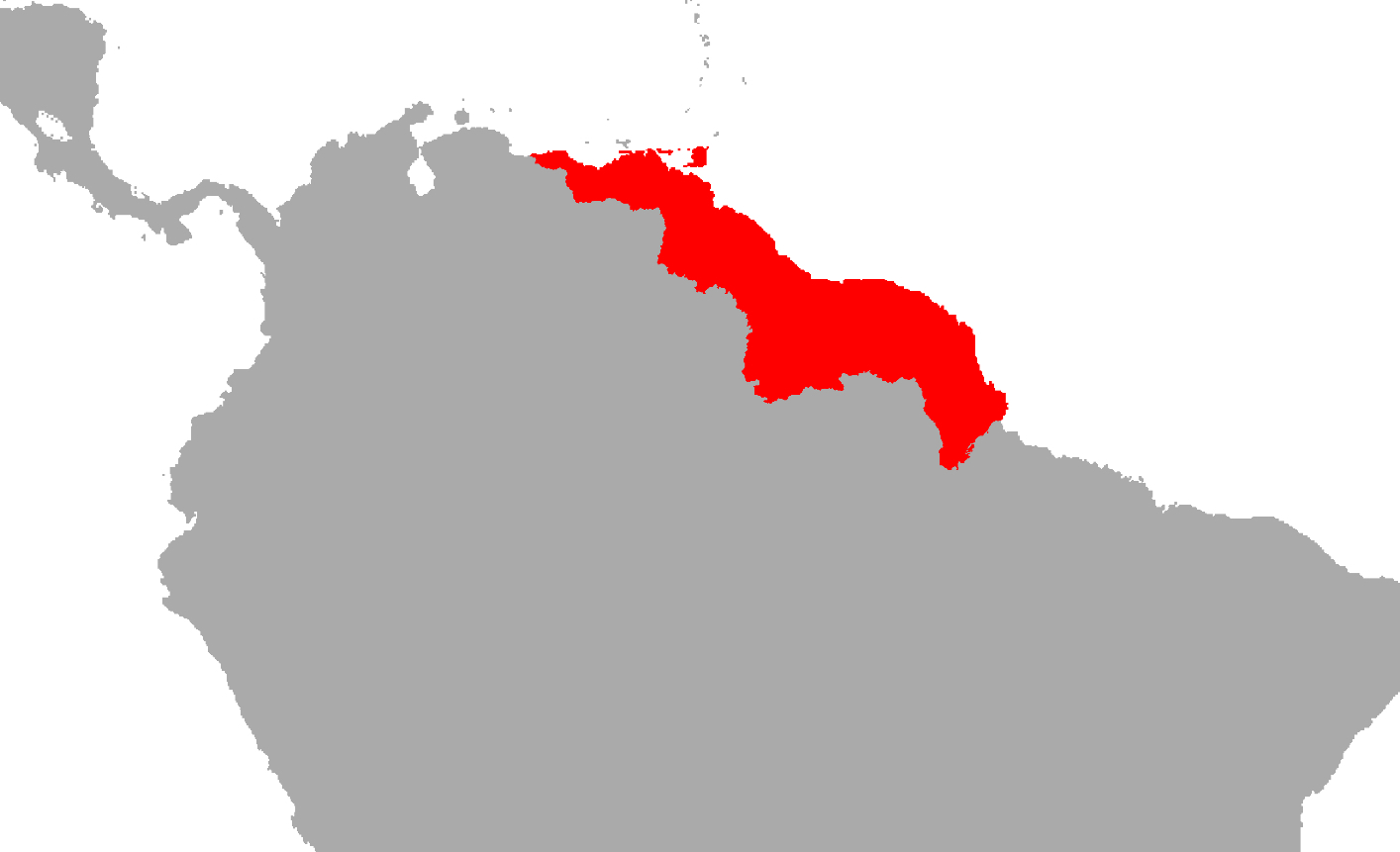

= Polycentrus schomburgkii =

Species of fish

Polycentrus schomburgkii, also known as the Guyana leaffish, is a species of fish belonging to the family Polycentridae. It inhabits fresh and brackish waters, both clear and turbid, of the northeastern part of South America and Trinidad. It reaches a maximum length of 5.5 centimetres (2.2 in).

== Description ==
The females are a deep brown, but the males are velvety-black with turquoise or silver spots and flecks. It uses its coloration to blend in with its surroundings.

== In the aquarium ==
Polycentrus schomburgkii is sometimes kept as an aquarium fish, where its small size allows for tanks as small as ten gallons in size. Like other South American leaffishes (and numerous other leaf-like fishes, for that matter) it is an ambush predator that floats motionless among plants until a smaller fish swims close enough for it to swallow. Because of its predator nature, its tank mates should be large enough to avoid being eaten; however, they also should not be vigorous enough to outcompete the leaf fish for food. These fish are known to be difficult aquarium inhabitants, requiring live foods such as small fish, bloodworms, and brine shrimp; they seldom adapt to a more prepared diet; further, they need soft, acidic, very clean water.

Spawning in the aquarium is known to be challenging. These fish spawn in a cave, often in a leaf, and the male guards them for 3 to 4 days before they become free swimming. The fry are well known for being very cannibalistic when poorly fed and are even more sensitive to sub par water quality than the parents.
