= Fourspine leaffish =

Conservation status
- Near Threatened (IUCN 3.1)

Scientific classification
- Kingdom: Animalia
- Phylum: Chordata
- Class: Actinopterygii
- Order: Cichliformes
- Family: Polycentridae
- Genus: Afronandus; Meinken, 1955
- Species: A. sheljuzhkoi

Binomial name
- Afronandus sheljuzhkoi (Meinken, 1954)

Synonyms
- For Genus: Nandopsis Meinken, 1954 (pre-occupied); For Species: Nandopsis sheljuzhkoi Meinken, 1954

Species of fish

The fourspine leaffish (Afronandus sheljuzhkoi) is a species of ray-finned fish native to rivers and streams in Ivory Coast and Ghana. Although formerly placed in the family Nandidae, most recent authorities place Afronandus in Polycentridae. The specific name honours the collector of the type, Leo Sheljuzhko (1890–1969), a Ukrainian-German entomologist who sent the type to Meinken.

This species grows to a total length of 4.8 cm (1.9 in). This species is the only known member of its genus.
