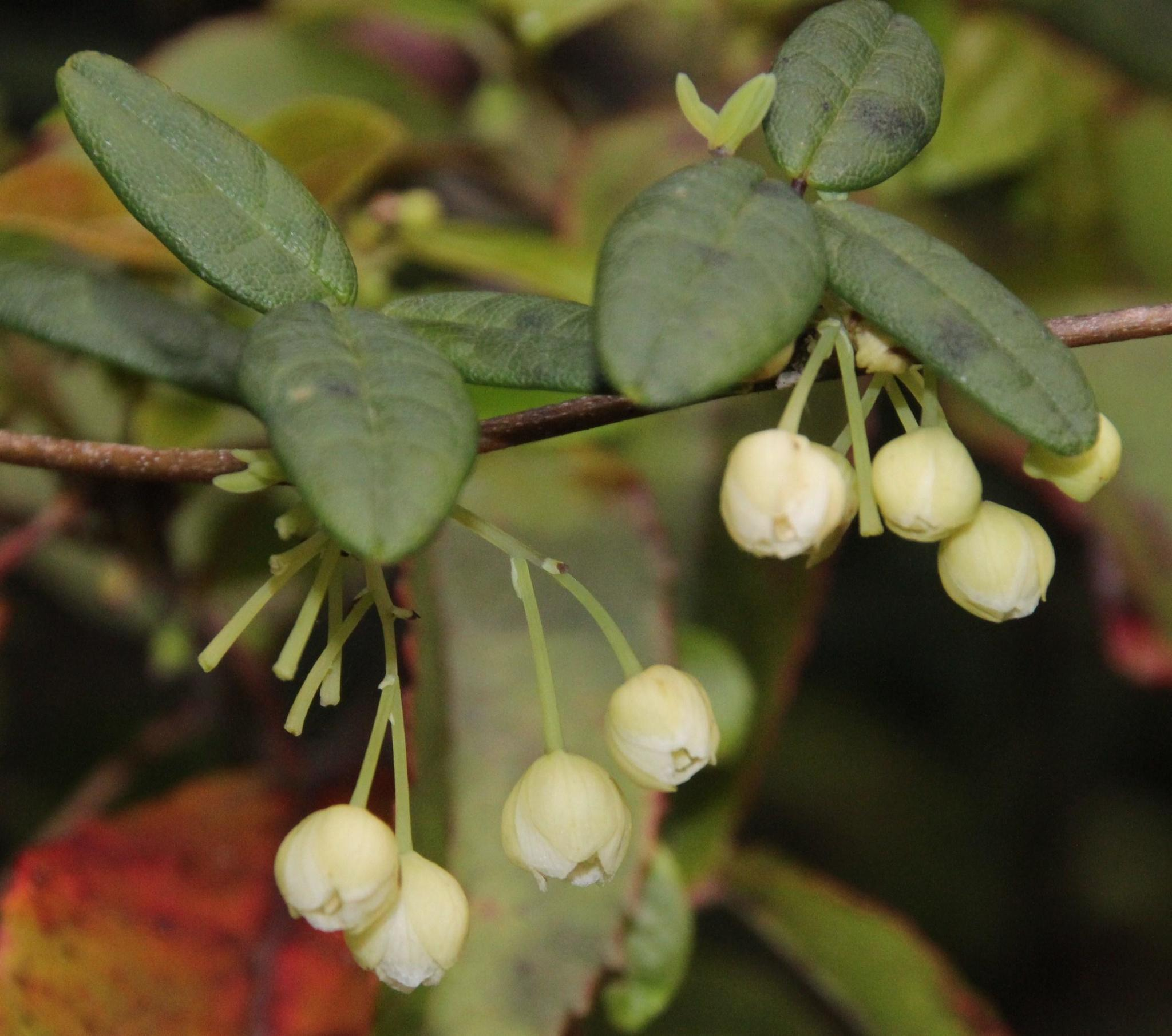
- At Puyehue National Park

Scientific classification
- Kingdom: Plantae
- Clade: Tracheophytes
- Clade: Angiosperms
- Clade: Eudicots
- Order: Ranunculales
- Family: Lardizabalaceae
- Genus: Boquila; Decne.
- Species: B. trifoliolata

Binomial name
- Boquila trifoliolata (DC.) Decne.

Synonyms
- Boquila discolor (Kunze ex Poepp. & Endl.) Decne.; Dolichos funarius Molina; Lardizabala funaria (Molina) Looser; Lardizabala trifoliolata DC.

= Boquila =

Genus of flowering plants

Boquila is a genus of flowering plants in the family Lardizabalaceae, endemic to temperate forests of central and southern Chile and Argentina. It is monotypic, being represented by the single species Boquila trifoliolata, locally known as voqui blanco or pilpil in its native range, or the chameleon vine since a 2014 report on leaf mimicry. The species was first described in 1782 by Juan Ignacio Molina, and the genus was established in 1839 by Joseph Decaisne. B. trifoliolata forms non-parasitic vines that wind around host plants, using them for structure and protection. B. trifoliolata is monoecious, a sexual system in seed plants where separate male and female cones or flowers are present on the same plant. Its flowers are off-white and it bears an edible fruit. The vine has been historically used in rope and basket making.

Boquila trifoliolata is the only known plant species that engages in mimetic polymorphism, or the ability to mimic multiple host species, often simultaneously. This is a form of Batesian mimicry, when a harmless species mimics a harmful one to ward off predators. Contact between the vines and host trees was reported not to be necessary for mimicking to commence. However, in the decade following the original study describing the species mimicry capabilities in 2014, no independent research groups have verified the field observations. The mechanism by which this mimicry occurs is still unknown. Hypotheses about the mimicry mechanism include microbial mediated horizontal gene transfer, volatile organic compound sensing, and the use of eye-like structures.

== Taxonomy and etymology ==
Boquila is a monotypic genus of flowering plants (angiosperms) in the family Lardizabalaceae with one known species, Boquila trifoliolata. The species was first described as Dolichos funarius in 1782 by Juan Ignacio Molina, and in 1817, the holotype Lardizabala trifoliolata was named by Augustin Pyramus de Candolle. In 1838, Stephan Endlicher, Eduard Friedrich Poeppig, and Gustav Kunze proposed the name Lardizabala discolor. In between 1837 and 1839, Joseph Decaisne identified Boquila trifoliolata and Boquila discolor, and established the Boquila genus in 1837. The name Boquila discolor was later declared a orthographic variant. In 1936, Gualterio Looser attempted to reclassify the species to Lardizabala funaria based upon the observations of Carlo Giuseppe Bertero, but this classification is not considered valid.

Because of its capability for mimicry, the species is sometimes called the chameleon vine.

== Description ==
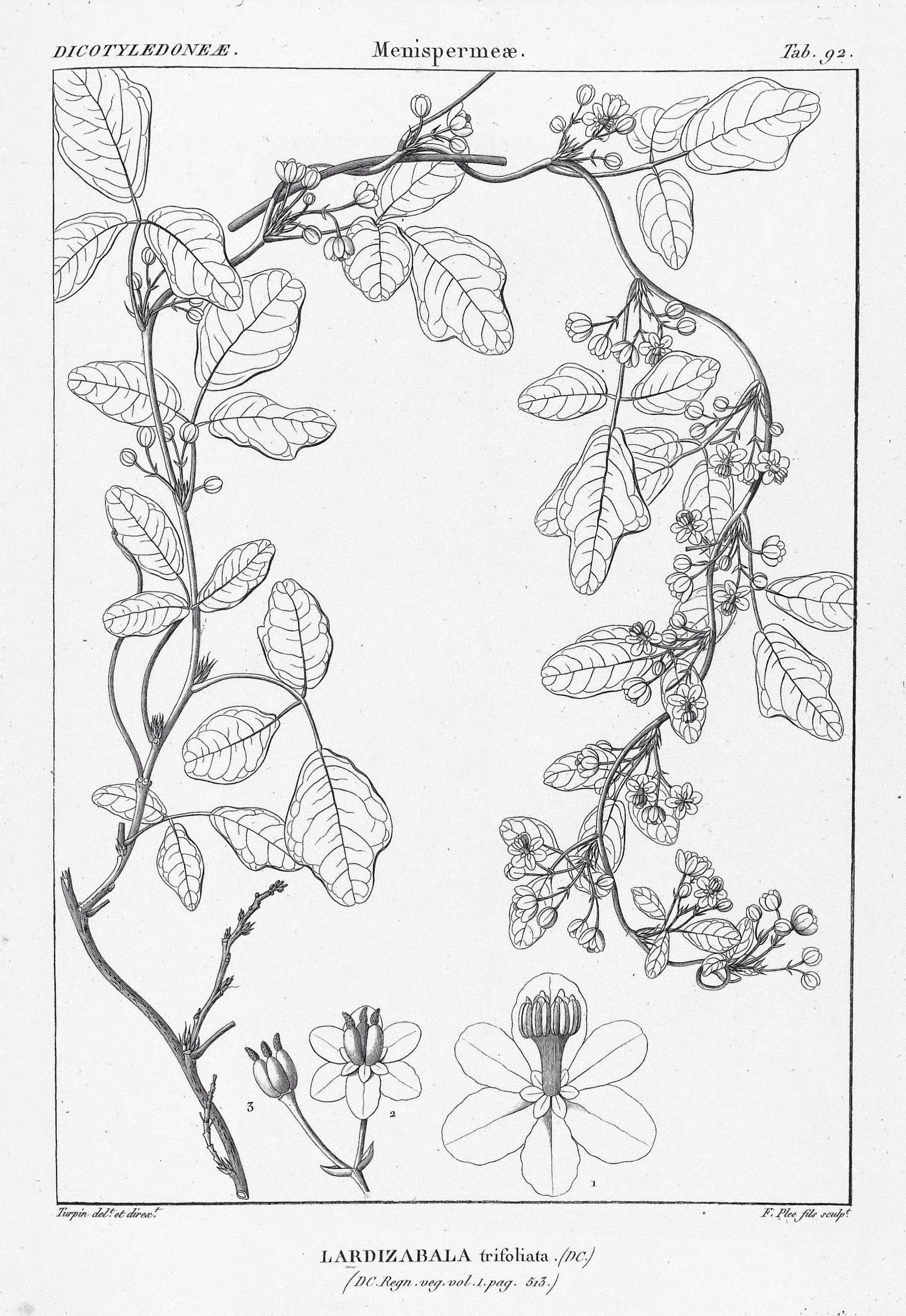
Illustration by Pierre Jean François Turpin

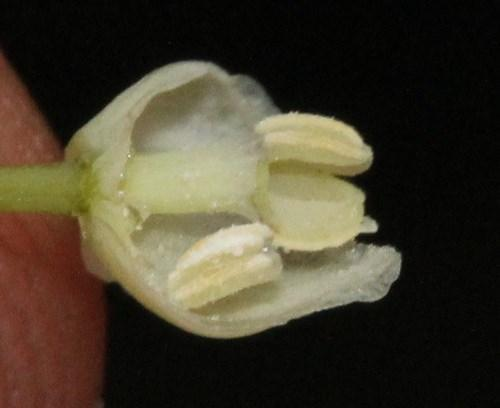
Interior cross-section of flower, at Puyehue National Park

Boquila trifoliolata is a woody vine with a highly variable appearance due to its crypsis abilities. The vines are evergreen or partly deciduous, meaning they largely retain their leaves over winter. The vines follow a twining pattern when climbing host plants, meaning the stems bend around host plants during their ascent. The branches are thin, less than 1 cm (0.39 in) in diameter, and are covered in red-brown bark. The lenticels are elliptical in shape, and the wider branches are a speckled grey color. When not mimicking a host plant, B. trifoliolata employs smaller 'charlatan leaves' that are short, stubby, and have three lobes (trifoliate). The petioles range from 2 cm (0.79 in) to 6 cm (2.4 in) in length and the petiolules range from 0.5 cm (0.20 in) to 1.5 cm (0.59 in) in length. Leaflets are oval or elliptical and range from 2 cm (0.79 in) to 6 cm (2.4 in) in height and 1 cm (0.39 in) to 3 cm (1.2 in) in width. The base of the leaves is rounded, the margins are irregular (most often trilobate), the tips are rounded and wide-angled, the top of the leaves are dark green and hairless, the undersides are glaucous (pale-grey to blue-green), and the veins have a pinnate pattern.

=== Reproduction ===
In its natural habitat, flowering occurs between September and December, while fruiting occurs between January and March. This pattern is opposite when the plant is raised in the Northern Hemisphere. B. trifoliolata is monoecious, meaning that both male and female floral parts are present in the same plant. The petals are small (1.5 cm (0.59 in) to 3 cm (1.2 in) in length) and have a green-white to yellow-white color. These flowers tend to be in 2- to 4-flower umbels with small hairs and lepidote bracts along the petals. Each flower has six sepals, and are biserate, petaloid, ovate, and the three inner sepals are larger than the outer ones. Staminate flowers (male flowers) have six stamens, petals in an opposite pattern, and anthers are oblate. Carpellate flowers (female flowers) have six conical staminodes, three carpels, an elongated stigma, and sutures running vertically up the petals.

The fruits are small, ranging from 0.5 cm (0.20 in) to 1 cm (0.39 in) in diameter, and white. There are typically 1-4 seeds per berry, ranging from 2.5 mm (0.098 in) to 5 mm (0.20 in). The seeds are oval, brown, and contain large amounts of endosperm. Seeds are largely dispersed via animal vectors and readily germinate when planted.

== Distribution and habitat ==
The Boquila genus is endemic to the temperate rainforests, Nothofagus forests, and evergreen forests of southern Argentina and Chile, ranging from Cauquenes to Chiloe. B. trifoliolata is most commonly found between 100 metres (330 ft) to 600 metres (2,000 ft) in elevation. Unlike many other species of vines, B. trifoliolata is not parasitic. Instead, it only attaches to trees for protection and structure, sometimes forming thickets over 6 metres (20 ft) in height. B. trifoliolata can survive temperatures as low as −8 °C (18 °F) and prefers soil rich in humus. The species is resistant to wilting, but generally prefers to grow in shaded environments.

== Mimicry ==
Boquila trifoliolata is the only plant known to engage in mimetic polymorphism, meaning it can mimic the leaves of multiple host plants. Other species of vines are capable of limited crypsis for one host species, but B. trifoliolata is notable since it can mimic the leaves of multiple species, with one vine capable of simultaneously mimicking multiple hosts. Mimetic polymorphism is only observed elsewhere in some species of butterflies, but that is the result of genetic divergence, unlike B. trifoliolata which engages in rapid changes in leaf morphology.

Once the vines approach a host tree's branches, the leaves begin to change their size, shape, color, vein patterns, spines, and orientation to match the host plant; sometimes expanding to 10x their original size. B. trifoliolata has been observed mimicking over 20 different species of plants. These include native species such as Luma apiculata, Cissus striata, and Rhaphithamnus spinosus but also non-native species such as Ranunculus repens.

Unlike most other mimicking species, close proximity is enough to induce mimicry and contact is not required. In one controversial study, B. trifoliolata has been noted to mimic the leaves of plastic plants. If the vines approach another tree, the vine begins simultaneously mimicking that species as well. Mimicry is largely confined to the leaves closest to the host, meaning that sections of the vine approximately 60 cm (24 in) away from the host retain the non-mimicking phenotype. This is a form of Batesian mimicry, where the B. trifoliolata is harmless but resembles a less palatable or harmful plant to ward off herbivory species and pests.

=== Possible explanations ===
The exact mechanism by which leaf mimicry occurs is not well understood, but it may involve chemical, odor, genetic, metagenomic, transcriptomic, proteomic, metabolomic, epigenetic, and/or microbial cues to identify and mimic the species it is attached to.

==== Volatile organic compounds ====
Plant ecologist Ernesto Gianoli proposed that the host tree may be emitting volatile organic compounds (VOCs) into the environment that B. trifoliolataa can detect. The use of VOC-mediated plant-to-plant communication is widely employed in non-specific biological processes, including up-regulation of defense-related genes, and could explain why no contact is necessary for mimicry. Criticisms of this hypothesis are that this would mark the first time that VOCs were used to change plant morphology, and that B. trifoliolata's mimicry has a level of specificity that is not normally seen with VOC-mediated responses.

==== Horizontal gene transfer ====
Another hypothesis proposed by Gianoli is that B. trifoliolata's mimicry is mediated by endophytic microbes that conduct horizontal gene transfer (HGT) between B. trifoliolata and the host plant. This would influence the genes, transposons, and/or epigenetics of the plant's leaves, identifying the host and changing the leaf's morphology without necessitating physical contact. In a 2021 study, Gianoli found that the microbiomes of B. trifoliolata and its host plant show significant overlap following the initiation of mimicry. Gianoli has argued this could represent a mechanism behind B. trifoliolata's mimicry but still acknowledged that there are limitations to this hypothesis. While HGT commonly occurs between different species, it takes many years and manifests in discrete events. Additionally, HGT between plants is most commonly observed in cases of parasitism, which B. trifoliolata does not engage in.

==== Ocelli ====
In a 2021 study published in the journal Plant Signaling & Behavior, Felipe Yamashita and Jacob White claimed that B. trifoliolata may employ a primitive form of vision to identify and mimic their hosts. This hypothesis is based upon 1905 and 1907 claims by Gottlieb Haberlandt and Francis Darwin, respectively, that some plants use 'ocelli' or lens-like cells to focus light onto other light sensitive cells. In this study, B. trifoliolata was observed mimicking the leaf shapes of plastic plants, and researchers refined Haberlandt and Darwin's ocelli hypothesis, claiming that B. trifoliolata may be using convex shaped lenses in epidermal tissue that can detect light and "see" the shapes of nearby leaves. They further proposed that, B. trifoliolata processes that information through an unknown means, possibly through neuron-like structures in order to initiate mimicry. The study also found that non-mimetic leaves have more free-end veinlets and identified the hormone auxin as a possible mediator in changes to leaf morphology.

This paper received substantial media coverage, was praised by the open publisher F1000's Faculty Opinions, and went viral on the social media following its release. František Baluška, a plant biologist and editor-in-chief of Plant Signaling & Behavior, praised this hypothesis, and claimed that root skototropism and photoreceptive cells in algae were analogous mechanisms for "plant sight". However, the paper's conclusions have largely been met with skepticism by scientists. Criticisms of the paper include poor methodology, White's lack of a scientific background, and possible conflicts of interest between Baluška and Yamashita. The research was awarded the 2024 Ig Nobel Prize for botany.

== Human uses ==
The stems are used locally in basketry and in rope making. The leaf juice was historically employed by local tribes to treat sore eyes, and was once believed to be an aphrodisiac. The plant is used ornamentally, and the berries are edible. Stems are often cut in the summer and rooted in cold frames as a means of propagation.
