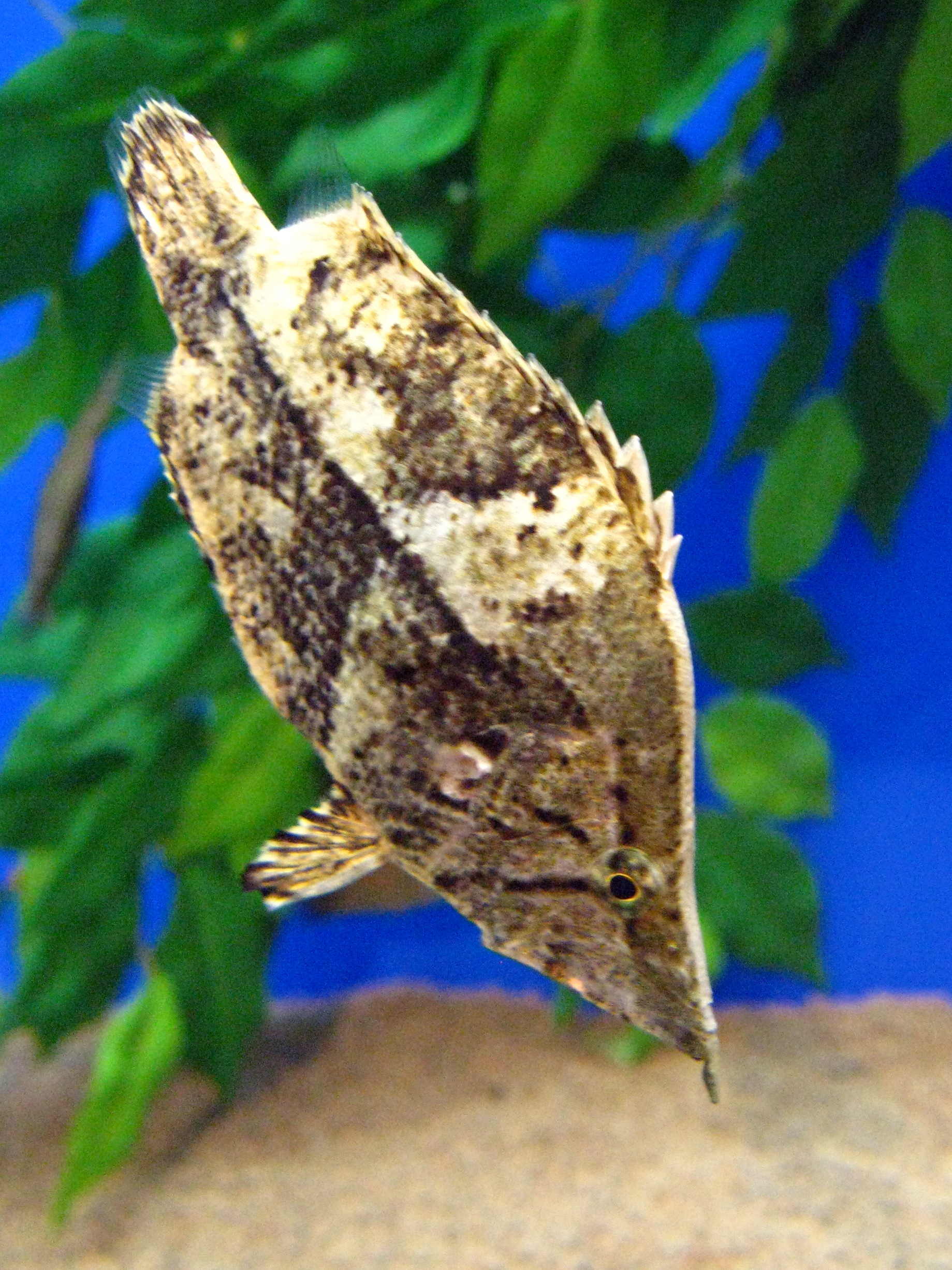
- Amazon leaffish in its usual head-down position

Conservation status
- Least Concern (IUCN 3.1)

Scientific classification
- Kingdom: Animalia
- Phylum: Chordata
- Class: Actinopterygii
- Division: Teleostei
- Order: Cichliformes
- Family: Polycentridae
- Genus: Monocirrhus; Heckel, 1840
- Species: M. polyacanthus

Binomial name
- Monocirrhus polyacanthus Heckel, 1840
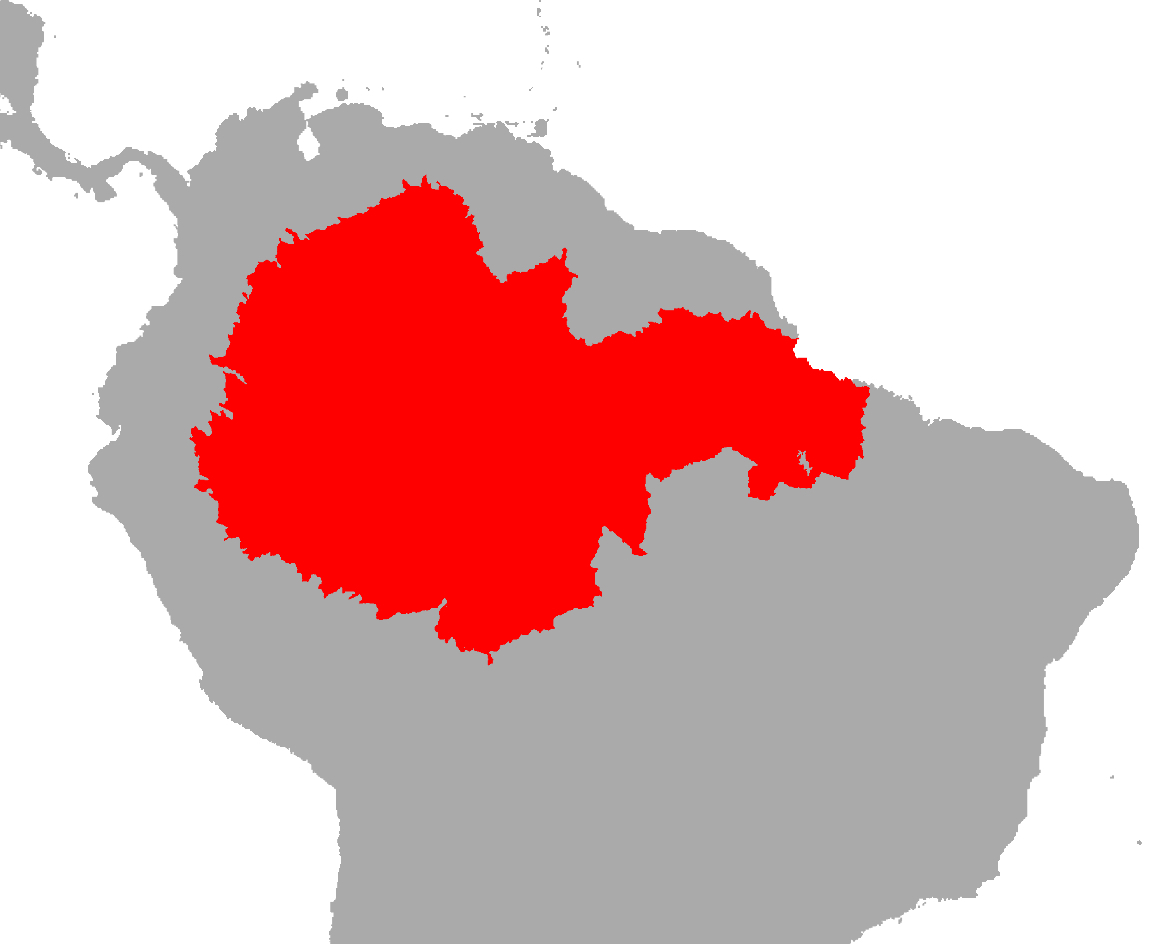

Synonyms
- Monocirrhus mimophyllus C. H. Eigenmann & Allen, 1921

= Amazon leaffish =

Species of fish

The Amazon leaffish (Monocirrhus polyacanthus), or South American leaffish, is a species of fish belonging to the family Polycentridae. It is found in the Amazon basin in Bolivia, Brazil, Colombia, Peru and Venezuela, where it inhabits edges of rivers and lakes, and streams. It is generally a low-density species that lives in slow-moving or essentially stagnant waters in areas with plant debris.

Amazon leaffish are sometimes kept in aquariums, but they require acidic water, low light and live prey.

== Appearance ==
The Amazon leaffish reaches a maximum standard length of 8 cm (3.1 in), and a total length of 10 cm (3.9 in). As suggested by its common name, it closely resembles a dead leaf. The flattened body and filament at the tip of the lower jaw (resembling a stalk) further enhances its similarity to a leaf. It is gray-brown, but can change its color to some extent. There is no lateral line and its large mouth can be protracted to as much as 60% of the head length.

== Behavior ==
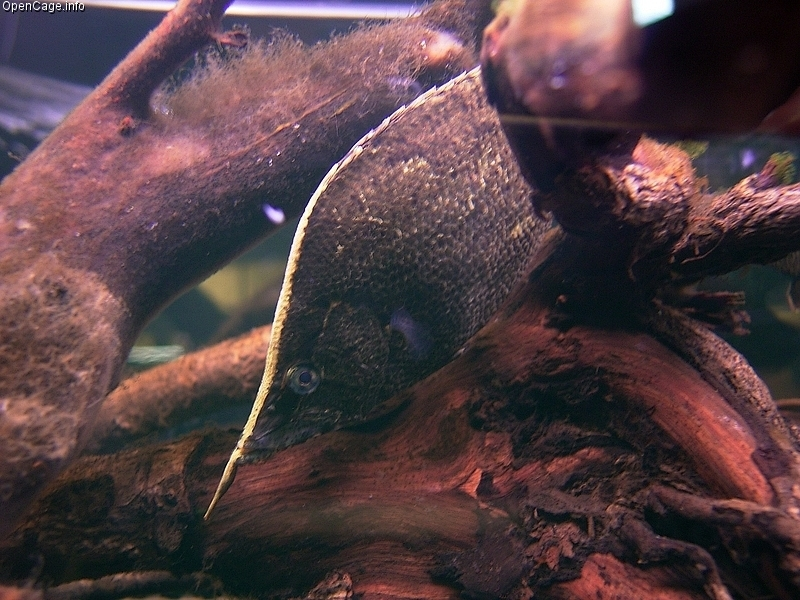
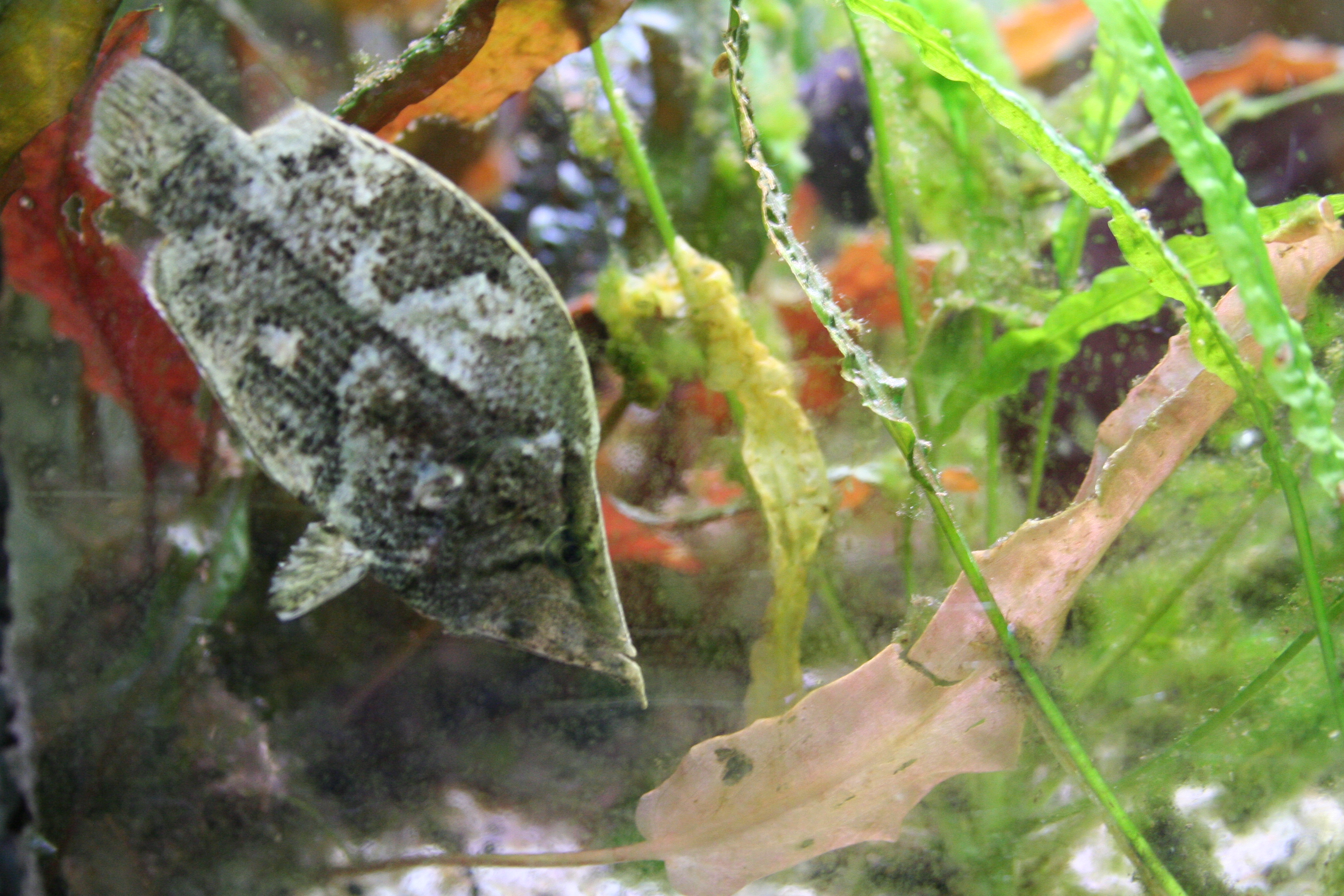
Plain brownish and mottled grayish Amazon leaffish, showing some of the color variations in the species. It can change its color to some extent.

The Amazon leaffish is highly predatory, feeding on small invertebrates (aquatic insects like mayfly nymphs and crustaceans like shrimp) and fish (especially Characids and Lebiasinids). Small Amazon leaffish mostly feed on invertebrates, while larger individuals mainly feed on fish. The prey fish are swallowed whole and they are often quite large compared to the size of the leaffish. The prey fish length is typically about 1/3 of the length of the leaffish, but can be up to around 2/3 the length. The camouflage allows the Amazon leaffish to both escape the attention of larger predators and ambush smaller prey. It swims very slowly in a head-down position, resembling a dead leaf floating in the current, to approach its prey. When near, it protracts its mouth to form a tube. The prey is rapidly sucked in, usually head-first. Prey in its stomach is often folded, allowing the leaffish to fit relatively large items.

Before breeding, the pair swims next to each other. The female lays up to 300 eggs on the underside of a rock or plant leaf, which are then fertilized by the male. The male takes care of the eggs, which hatch after 3–4 days. They are predators from the start of their lives; in captivity they are first fed with tiny animals like brine shrimp and water fleas.
