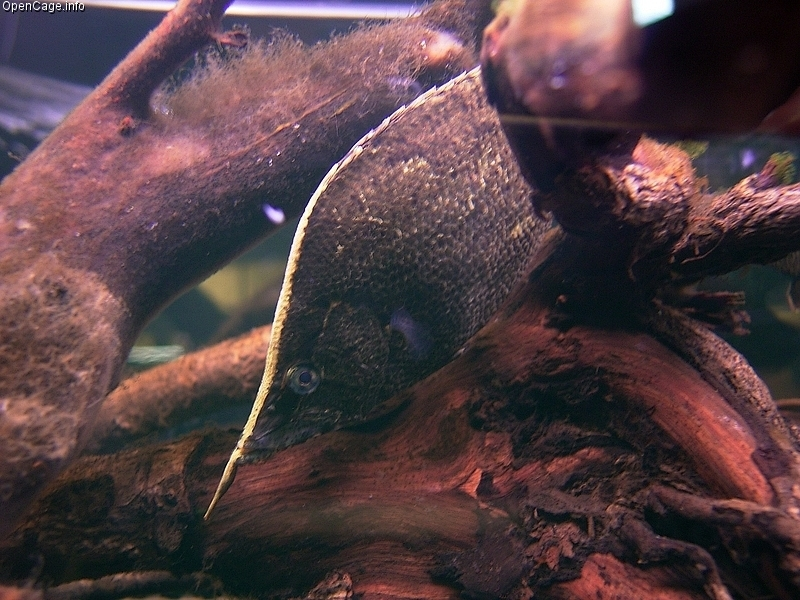
- Monocirrhus polyacanthus

Scientific classification
- Kingdom: Animalia
- Phylum: Chordata
- Class: Actinopterygii
- Division: Teleostei
- Order: Cichliformes
- Family: Polycentridae; T. N. Gill, 1858

Genera
- Afronandus Meinken, 1955; Monocirrhus Heckel 1840; Polycentropsis Boulenger, 1901; Polycentrus Müller & Troschel 1848

= Polycentridae =

Family of fishes

Leaffishes are small fishes of the family Polycentridae. They consist of four genera found in fresh and brackish water in South America and Africa.

The African species were formerly placed in the Anabantiform family Nandidae (otherwise found only in Asia), but recent taxonomic studies have affirmed their relationship to the South American species. Their taxonomic placement was previously debated, but they are now generally placed in the order Cichliformes.

All of these fishes are highly specialized ambush predators that resemble leaves, down to the point that their swimming style resembles a drifting leaf (thus the common name leaf fish); when a prey animal - such as an aquatic insect or smaller fish - comes within range, the fish attacks, swallowing the prey potentially within a quarter of a second. To aid in this lifestyle, all members of the family have large heads, cryptic colors, and very large protractile mouths capable of taking prey items nearly as large as they are. These intriguing behaviors have given the family a niche in the aquarium hobby; however, none of these species are easy to maintain in aquariums, requiring very clean, soft, acidic water and copious amounts of live foods.

== Genera and species ==
Based on the Catalog of Fishes (2025):

- Genus Afronandus Meinken, 1955
  - Afronandus sheljuzhkoi (Meinken, 1954) (fourspine leaffish)
- Genus Monocirrhus Heckel, 1840
  - Monocirrhus polyacanthus Heckel, 1840 (Amazon leaffish)
- Genus Polycentropsis Boulenger, 1901
  - Polycentropsis abbreviata Boulenger, 1901
- Genus Polycentrus Müller & Troschel, 1849
  - Polycentrus jundia Coutinho & Wosiacki, 2014
  - Polycentrus schomburgkii Müller & Troschel, 1849 (Guyana leaffish)
