= Scarlet badis =

- Dario dario male

Conservation status
- Data Deficient (IUCN 3.1)

Scientific classification
- Kingdom: Animalia
- Phylum: Chordata
- Class: Actinopterygii
- Order: Anabantiformes
- Family: Badidae
- Genus: Dario
- Species: D. dario

Binomial name
- Dario dario (F. Hamilton, 1822)

Synonyms
- Labrus dario Hamilton, 1822; Badis dario (Hamilton, 1822)

Species of fish

The scarlet badis (Dario dario) is a tropical freshwater fish and one of the smallest known percoid fish species. It is a micropredator, feeding on small aquatic crustaceans, worms, insect larvae and other zooplankton. It is sold under a variety of names (Badis badis bengalensis, B. bengalensis) in the aquarium trade.

== Description ==
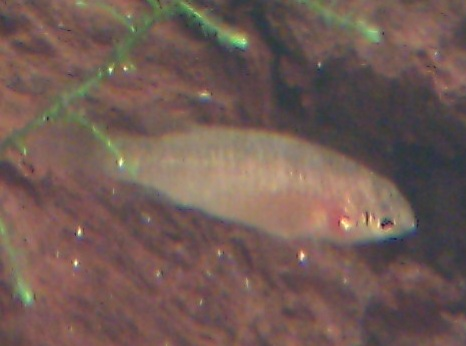
Scarlet badis female

Scarlet badis are among the smallest percoid fish species. Males usually do not exceed 2 cm (0.79 in), with the females being even smaller around 1.3 cm (0.51 in), the maximum length can reach 3.5 cm (1.4 in) to 4 cm (1.6 in). Apart from the size difference, the sexes are easy to distinguish by the vibrant colors and prominent fins of the male.

== Distribution and habitat ==
The distribution of this species appears to be restricted to tributary systems draining into the Brahmaputra River in parts of West Bengal and Assam states of India, although it might also range into Bhutan. It typically inhabits shallow, clear water streams with sand or gravel substrates and dense growths of marginal and/or aquatic vegetation.
