= Dario (fish) =

- Dario dario (male)

Scientific classification
- Kingdom: Animalia
- Phylum: Chordata
- Class: Actinopterygii
- Division: Teleostei
- Order: Anabantiformes
- Family: Badidae
- Genus: Dario; S. O. Kullander & Britz, 2002

Type species
- Labrus dario F. Hamilton, 1822

Genus of fishes

Dario is a genus of very small chameleonfishes native to streams and freshwater pools in China (Yunnan), India (northeastern part of the country and Western Ghats) and Myanmar. Depending on the exact species, they are up to 1.5–3 cm (0.6–1.2 in) in standard length, and are reddish or brownish in color.

== Species ==
There are currently 9 recognized species in this genus:

- Dario dario F. Hamilton, 1822
- Dario dayingensis S. O. Kullander & Britz, 2002
- Dario huli Britz & P. H. A. Ali, 2015
- Dario hysginon S. O. Kullander & Britz, 2002
- Dario kajal Britz & S. O. Kullander, 2013
- Dario melanogrammus Britz, S. O. Kullander & Rüber, 2022
- Dario neela Britz, V. K. Anoop & N. Dahanukar, 2018
- Dario tigris Britz, S. O. Kullander & Rüber, 2022
- Dario urops Britz, P. H. A. Ali & Philip, 2012
