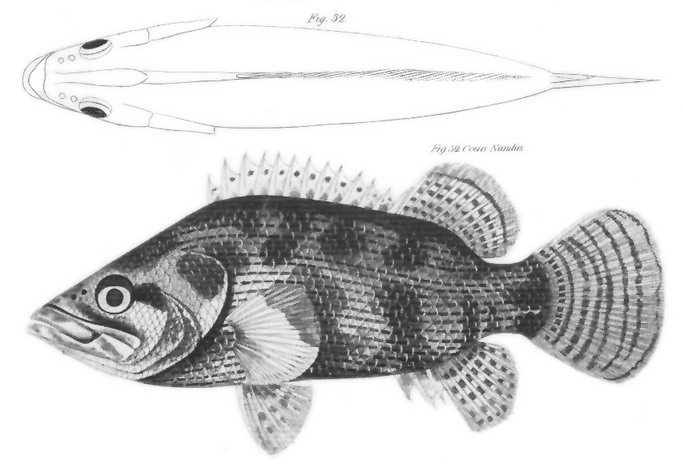
- An 1822 illustration of Nandus nandus

Scientific classification
- Kingdom: Animalia
- Phylum: Chordata
- Class: Actinopterygii
- Division: Teleostei
- Order: Anabantiformes
- Suborder: Nandoidei
- Family: Nandidae; Bleeker, 1852
- Genus: Nandus; Valenciennes, 1831

Type species
- Nandus marmoratus Valenciennes, 1831

Synonyms
- Bedula J. E. Gray, 1835

= Nandus =

Genus of fishes

Nandus, the Asian leaffishes, is a genus of small freshwater ray-finned fishes native to southern and southeastern Asia. It is the only member of the family Nandidae, which is classified in the order Anabantiformes and closely related to the Badidae and Pristolepididae.

Fishes of the World considered this family and its relatives to be of uncertain taxonomic placement, but more recent taxonomic studies have reaffirmed its anabantiform affinities. Until recently, this family also contained Afronandus and Polycentropsis of tropical West and Middle Africa. However, genetic studies suggest that these the two African genera actually belong to the Cichliform South American leaffish family Polycentridae, which is only distantly related to Nandus (the "true" Nandidae). Nandus remains closely related to the other Anabantiform leafish family, the Pristolepididae, or Asian Leaffishes.

These fish usually have a coloration that appears to have evolved to resemble dead leaves, and very large protractile mouths. Those features, along with their peculiar movements (seemingly intended to resemble a leaf innocently moving through the water) help them to catch fairly large prey compared to their body size, including small fish, aquatic insects, and other invertebrates. They tend to stay in one place and wait for prey; they are "lie-in-wait" predators.

Their odd, leaf-like appearance and unusual behavior make them interesting to aquarium hobbyists.

== Species ==
The currently recognized species in this genus are:

- Nandus andrewi H. H. Ng & Jaafar, 2008
- Nandus meni Hossain & Sarker, 2013
- Nandus mercatus H. H. Ng, 2008
- Nandus nandus (F. Hamilton, 1822) (Gangetic leaffish)
- Nandus nebulosus (J. E. Gray, 1835) (Bornean leaffish)
- Nandus oxyrhynchus H. H. Ng, Vidthayanon & P. K. L. Ng, 1996
- Nandus prolixus Chakrabarty, Oldfield & H. H. Ng, 2006
