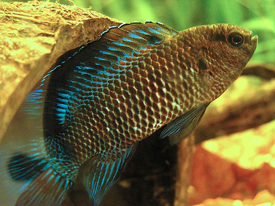
- Badis badis
- Dario dario (male)

Scientific classification
- Kingdom: Animalia
- Phylum: Chordata
- Class: Actinopterygii
- Order: Anabantiformes
- Suborder: Nandoidei
- Family: Badidae; Barlow, Liem & Wickler, 1968

Genera
- Badis Bleeker, 1853; Dario Kullander & Britz, 2002

= Badidae =

Family of fishes

The Badidae, or the chameleonfishes, are a small family (containing about 30 species) of freshwater ray-finned fish in the order Anabantiformes. Their relationship to other members of the order was previously uncertain, with the 5th edition of Fishes of the World placing the family outside the order, alongside the Nandidae and Pristolepididae, in an unnamed and unranked but monophyletic clade. However, they are now placed in the anantiform suborder Nandoidei. Members of this family are small freshwater fish that are found in Bangladesh, Bhutan, China, India, Laos, Myanmar, Nepal, Pakistan and Thailand. The largest is Badis assamensis that reaches a standard length of up to 7.5 cm (3 in), while the smallest, Dario dario, does not exceed 2 cm (0.8 in).
