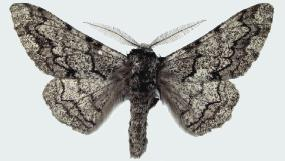
- Male
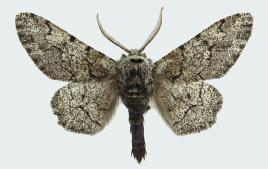
- Another Male

Scientific classification
- Kingdom: Animalia
- Phylum: Arthropoda
- Clade: Pancrustacea
- Class: Insecta
- Order: Lepidoptera
- Family: Geometridae
- Genus: Biston
- Species: B. robustum

Binomial name
- Biston robustum Butler, 1879

Synonyms
- Biston robustum kiangsua Wehrli, 1941

= Biston robustum =

Species of moth

Biston robustum is a species of moth belonging to the family Geometridae. This is a large moth and has the English common name in its native range as the giant geometer moth (The Japanese name is トビモンオオエダシャク, Korean name 몸큰가지나, Chinese 褐纹大尺蛾). It is related, and generally similar, to the widespread Peppered Moth.

The species is found in China (Shandong, Shaanxi, Shanghai, Jiangsu, Jiangxi), Taiwan, Japan, Russia, North Korea, South Korea and Vietnam.

This species has recently gained attention due to the discovery of its use of chemical mimicry to avoid predation by ants. The larva of this species, in common with many other geometrids, uses visual mimicry, strongly resembling a twig of its host plant. Recent studies have shown that it also uses chemical mimicry, storing chemicals from its food in its cuticle so that ants are largely unable to distinguish it from a twig, even after making contact with their highly sensitive antennae. Ants foraging for prey have been observed walking along the moth larvae, oblivious of their presence. Utilizing the chemicals directly from diet is advantageous as the larva will always be a chemical match to the plant it is actually feeding on (the species is highly polyphagous - see below). It has been predicted that, with further study, other species will also be shown use this form of defence.

== Food plants ==
The larvae of this species are polyphagous, feeding on a wide range of different plant genera including:

- Abelia
- Acer
- Akebia
- Bothrocaryum
- Camellia
- Castanea
- Celastrus
- Chaenomeles
- Corylus
- Euonymus
- Eurya
- Forsythia
- Ilex
- Malus
- Prunus
- Pyrus
- Quercus
- Robinia
- Rosa
- Styrax
- Viburnum
- Zelkova
