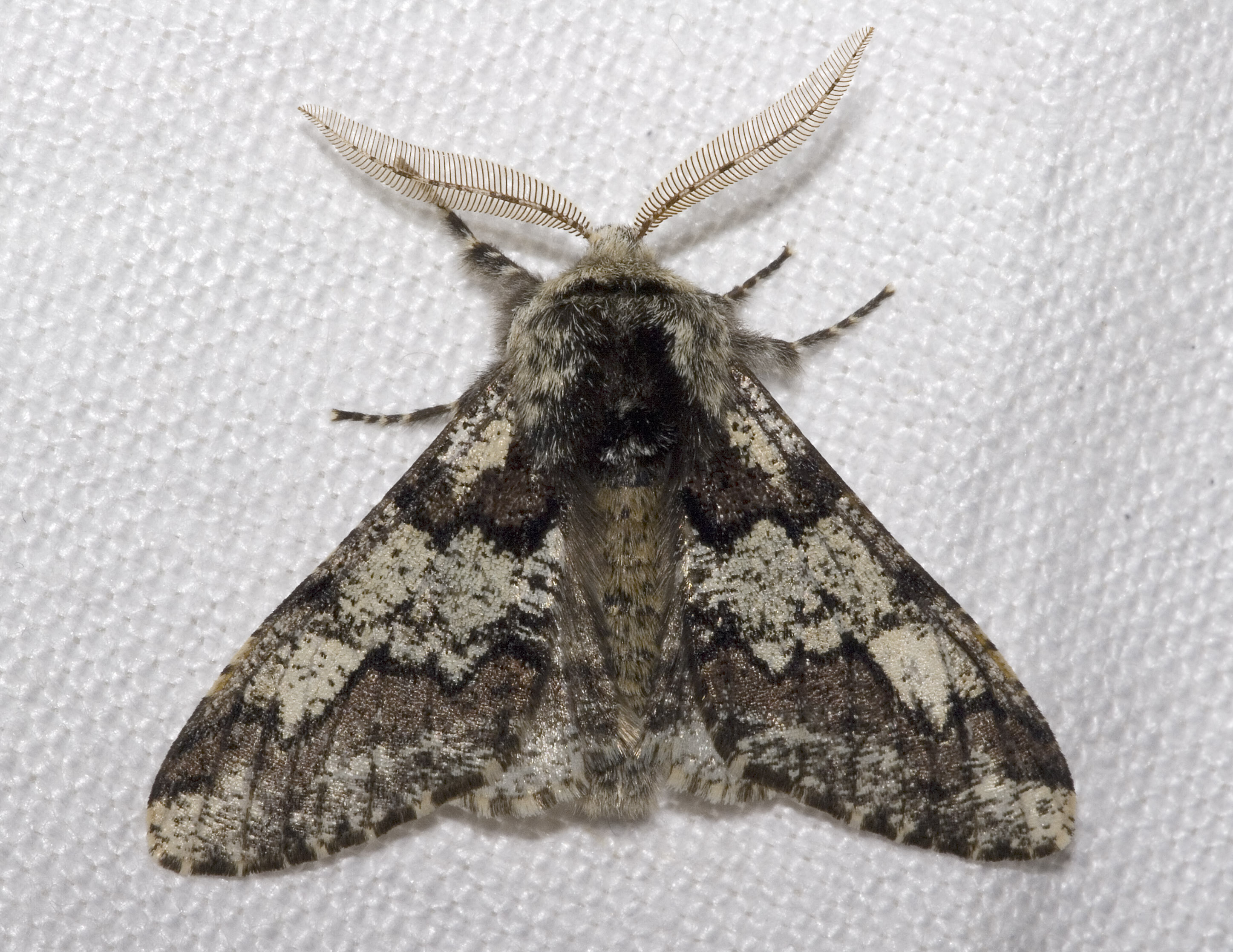
- Male

Scientific classification
- Kingdom: Animalia
- Phylum: Arthropoda
- Class: Insecta
- Order: Lepidoptera
- Family: Geometridae
- Genus: Biston
- Species: B. strataria

Binomial name
- Biston strataria (Hufnagel, 1767)

= Biston strataria =

Species of moth

Biston strataria, the oak beauty, is a moth of the family Geometridae. It is native to Europe, the Balkan countries and the Black Sea region as far as Asia Minor and the Caucasus. The species was first described by Johann Siegfried Hufnagel in 1767. B. strataria is found in a variety of habitats, but is mostly found in woodlands where it rests on the bark of trees, camouflaged by its mottled black and grey wings. The male has feather-like antennae while those of the female are more thread-like. The moth has a wingspan of 40 to 56 mm (1.6 to 2.2 in).

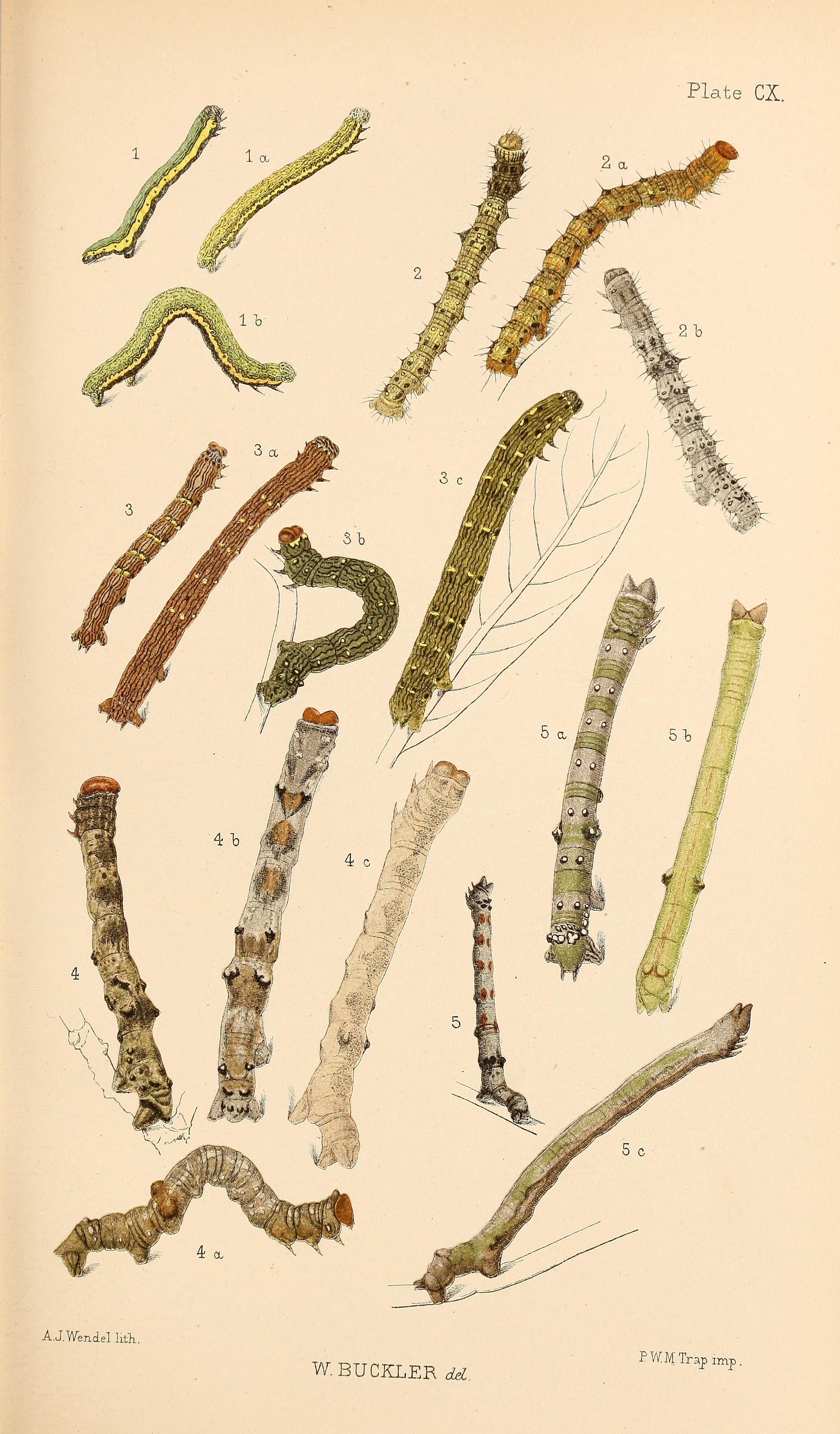
Fig 4,4a,4b,4c Larva after final moult

The larvae are mainly brown with three lumps near the end of the abdomen. They have evolved to resemble sticks which helps protect them from predators. The larvae feed on many species of trees, but the most commonly used host plants are oaks.

== Morphology ==
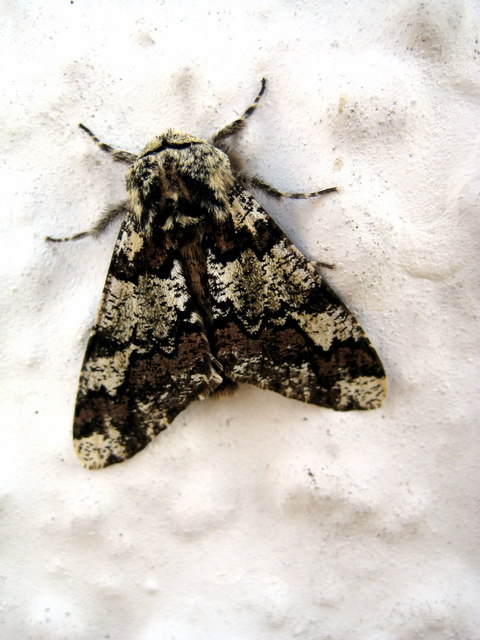
Adult resting on the side of a wall

The oak beauty has white forewings with two irregular broad brown bands along each wing. The first band is short, located near the base of the wing, and surrounded with a black border. The second band is located near the outer margin with a black border surrounding the inner edge. Between these two bands is a white space sprinkled with black dots as well as a crescent-shaped black mark near the middle. The overall appearance gives the oak beauty a mottled look. B. strataria‘s forewings are 17–27 mm (0.67–1.06 in) in diameter, while its wingspan ranges from 40–56 mm (1.6–2.2 in). The oak beauty's hind wings are paler than its fore wings and have transverse black bands. The forehead and the front of the thorax are white while its sides are a white-grey blend. Its body is covered with many hairs. The back of the thorax and the body are a darker shade of brown.

The oak beauty exhibits melanism and comes in two different variations; a dark (melanic) form and light (typica) form. The melanic form is prevalent in the Netherlands, but this form has not been observed in Britain. Details explaining this discrepancy are not yet known. The closest relative to B. strataria is the peppered moth (Biston betularia), which also has two forms. The proportion of melanics is higher in B. betularia compared to B. strataria. This is unusual since, between the two species, it is B. strataria that should have a greater evolutionary selection for the prevalence of melanic individuals due to the higher pollution concentrations in the area.

=== Sex differentiation ===
Adult males possess feathered antennae and are frequently observed during the daytime. Such feathered antennae are thought to aid in sensing female pheromones from over a kilometre away (0.6 miles). This helps males locate females for mating.

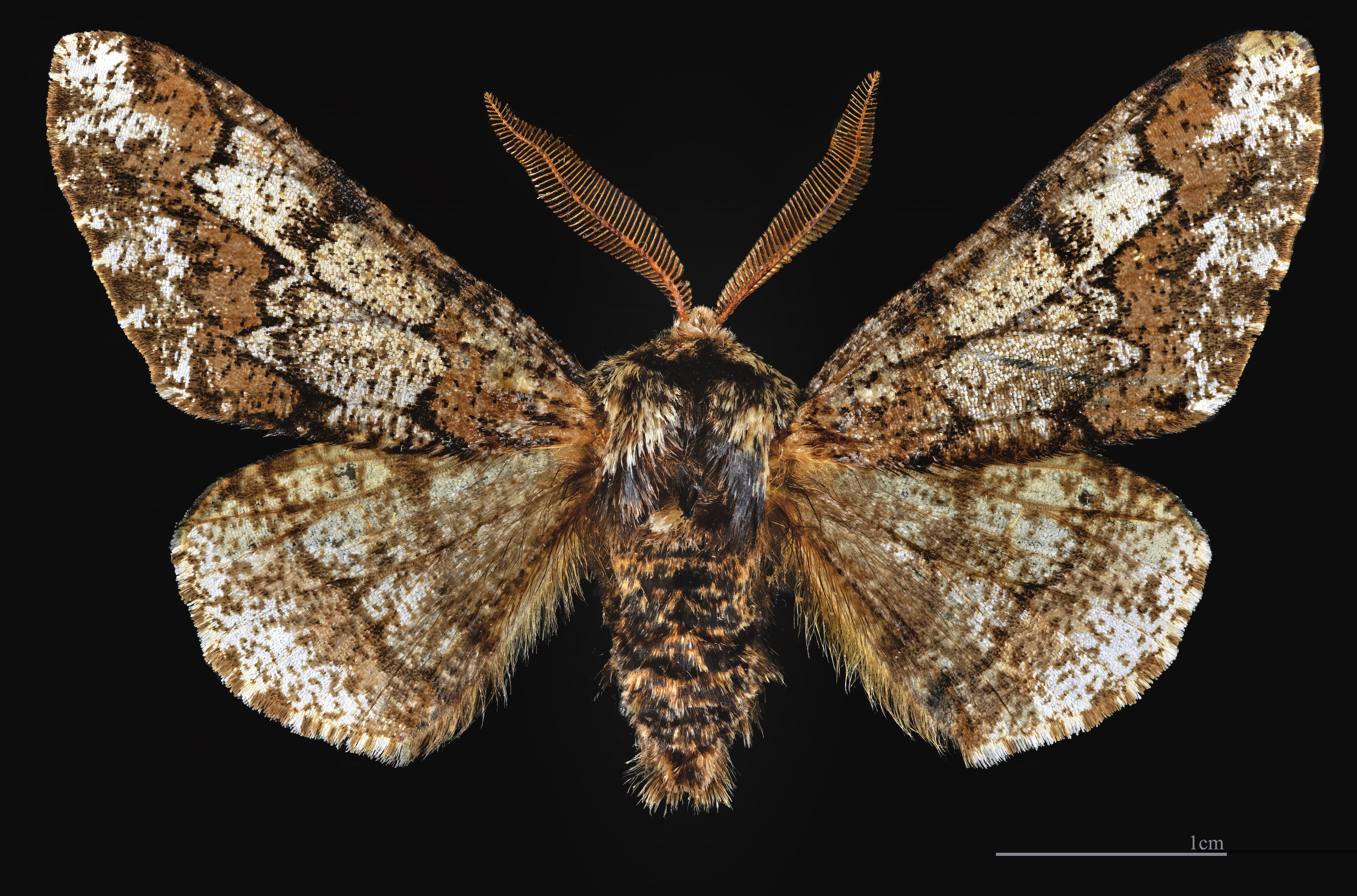
♂

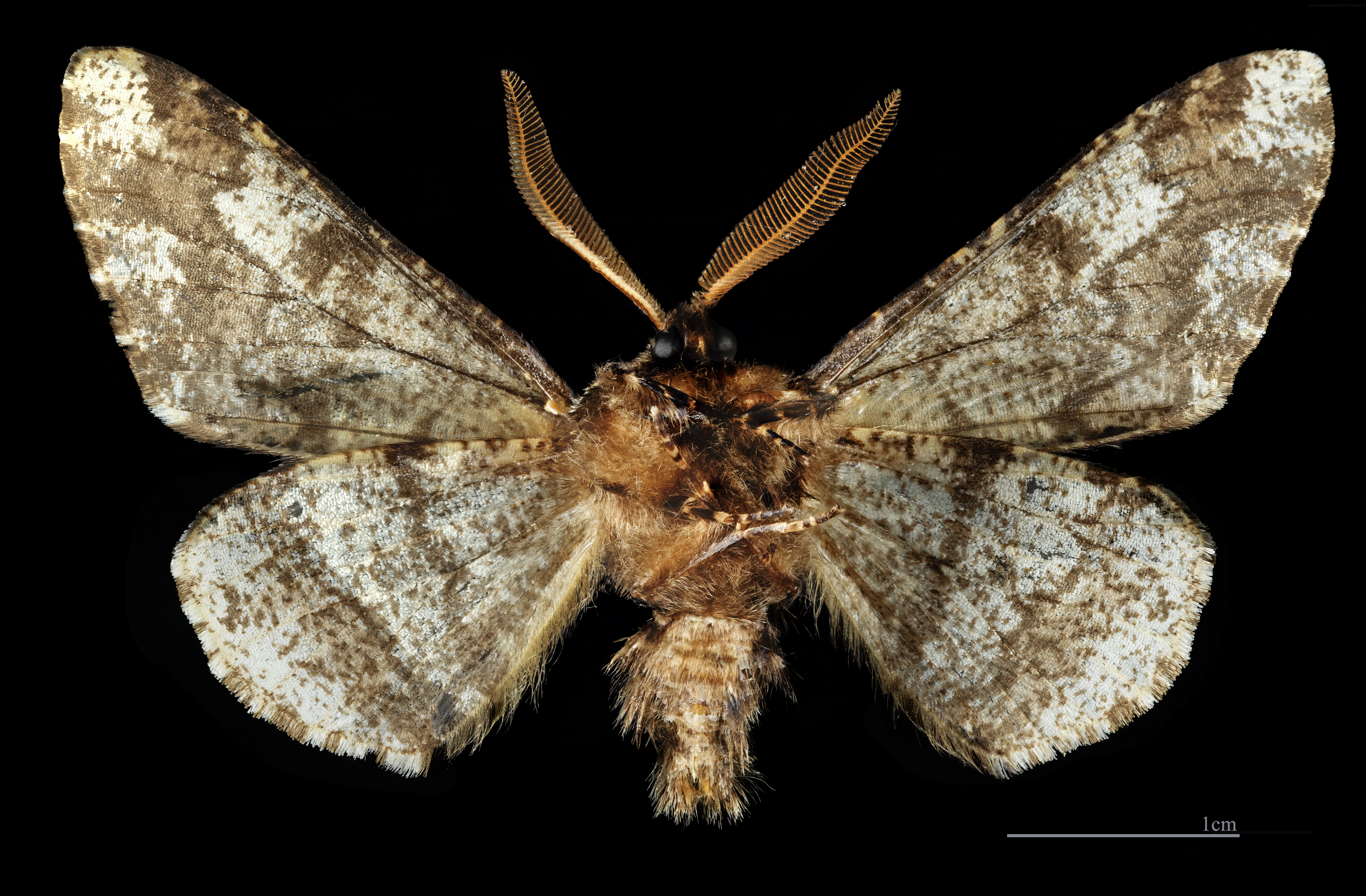
♂ △

Females are observed less often during the day than their male counterparts, and their antennae are thinner and more threadlike than the males'.

== Distribution and habitat ==
It is common throughout Europe, with the exception of the far north and the far south. In the south, its range extends through the entire Mediterranean, the Balkan countries and the Black Sea region as far as Asia Minor and the Caucasus. In the north it reaches the southern Fennoscandia. It is found in the British Isles including Ireland.

In July and August, the larvae can be found feeding on various host plants. B. strataria is prevalent in wooded areas including parks, gardens, and other suburban habitats. It is usually found on the trunk of trees where it can blend with its surroundings

== Behavior ==
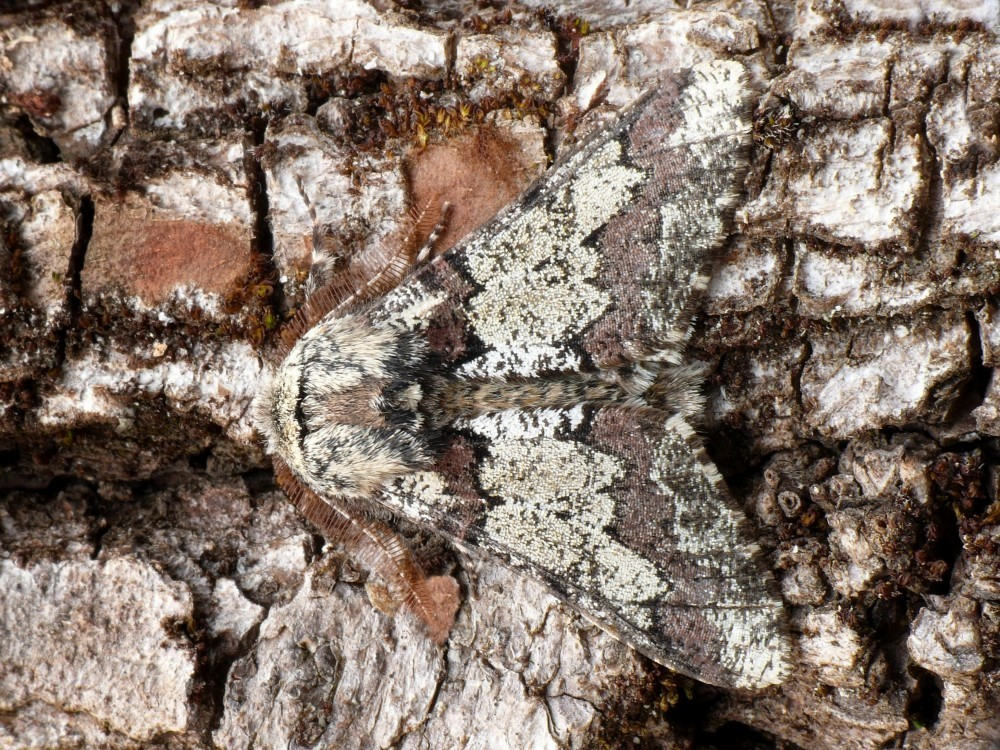
Male resting on a tree trunk

Adults emerge in early spring. B. strataria begins its flight period from mid-March to April, which is an early flight period compared to other moth species. B. strataria usually flies at night and is readily attracted to light. Its mottled appearance aids in its concealment from predators when it rests on tree trunks during the day Although the adult camouflages well with its surroundings, predators may occasionally spot the moth. In these circumstances the moth has one last defense mechanism – its hindwings, which were previously hidden in the resting position, carries shocking markings which may warn off predators when suddenly exposed.

== Larvae ==
The oak beauty caterpillar is brown, marbled with white, and has two small red lumps on the back of its eighth, ninth and twelfth segments and a small lump on the belly on the seventh, eighth and ninth segments. The caterpillar's head is slightly notched in the middle, possibly due to evolutionary pressures to resemble twigs in appearance.

The larvae are found from spring to fall feed on a variety of deciduous trees including oak (Quercus spp.), elm (Ulmus spp.), hazel (Corylus avellana), aspen (Populus tremula) and alder (Alnus glutinosa).

== Evolution ==
=== Larvae ===
An experiment was carried out to discover whether caterpillars of B. strataria, Ennomos alniaria, and Lycia hirtaria were protected from Eurasian jays and common chaffinches by their resemblance to the sticks they resided upon. In this experiment, the larvae and twigs were scattered across an area while seven Garrulus glandarius were positioned to prey on the larvae. When the larvae were not confused as twigs, it took G. glandarius ten seconds to find their prey. When more twigs were present than caterpillars, it took the birds between one and forty minutes to find the larvae. After finding the first caterpillar, G. glandarius quickly increased its rate of attack on both the larvae and the twigs. This experiment concluded that these caterpillars' adaptation to their environment does not give them the best possible protection.

Tinbergen added on to de Ruiter's experiments and found that when caterpillars were more abundant than twigs, birds continued to hunt; when caterpillars seemed rare in comparison to twigs, birds stopped hunting altogether. Brower concludes that a bird's continuous quest for caterpillars after discovering larvae puts surrounding larvae in danger, despite how well these caterpillars blend in with their environment. Brower has speculated that bird behaviour is density-dependent as well as dependent upon finding surrounding larvae of the similar phenotypic properties to the one it just consumed. Although past theories have speculated that either Batesian mimicry or crypsis were at play to explain these circumstances, further studies by Skelhorn have proven neither are correct. Rather, this phenomenon is quite different from the former two and is now commonly recognized as masquerade.

=== Adult ===
B. strataria demonstrates coincident colouration. A cryptic disruptive pattern on the wings breaks up the outline, while the colouration blends well with the tree bark on which the oak beauty rests.
