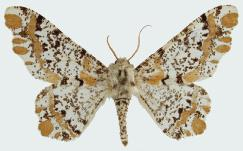
- Male
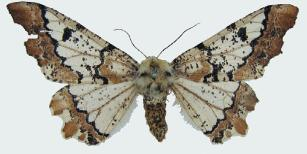
- Female

Scientific classification
- Domain: Eukaryota
- Kingdom: Animalia
- Phylum: Arthropoda
- Class: Insecta
- Order: Lepidoptera
- Family: Geometridae
- Genus: Biston
- Species: B. falcata

Binomial name
- Biston falcata (Warren, 1893)

Synonyms
- Eubyjodonta falcata Warren, 1893; Biston emarginaria Leech, 1897; Amphidasis erilda Oberthür, 1910; Amphidasis clorinda Oberthür, 1910; Biston falcata clorinda; Biston erilda satura Wehrli, 1941

= Biston falcata =

Species of moth

Biston falcata is a moth of the family Geometridae. It is found in China (Henan, Shaanxi, Gansu, Hubei, Sichuan).

== Subspecies ==
- Biston falcata falcata
- Biston falcata satura (Wehrli, 1941)
