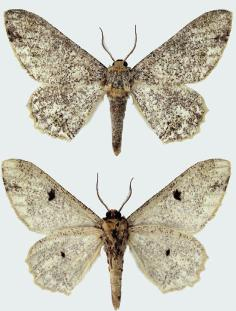
- Male, upperside and underside

Scientific classification
- Domain: Eukaryota
- Kingdom: Animalia
- Phylum: Arthropoda
- Class: Insecta
- Order: Lepidoptera
- Family: Geometridae
- Genus: Biston
- Species: B. suppressaria

Binomial name
- Biston suppressaria (Guenée, 1858)

Synonyms
- Amphidasys suppressaria Guenée, 1858; Buzura suppressaria; Buzura suppressaria benescripta Prout, 1915; Biston (Buzura) suppressaria f. benesparsa Wehrli, 1941; Buzura multipunctaria Walker, 1863; Biston luculentus Inoue, 1992

= Biston suppressaria =

Tea looper

Species of insect

Biston suppressaria, the tea looper, is a moth of the family Geometridae. It is found in China (Henan, Shaanxi, Jiangsu, Anhui, Zhejiang, Hubei, Jiangxi, Hunan, Fujian, Guangdong, Hainan, Hong Kong, Guangxi, Sichuan, Chongqing, Guizhou, Yunnan, Tibet), India, Myanmar, Nepal, and Sri Lanka.

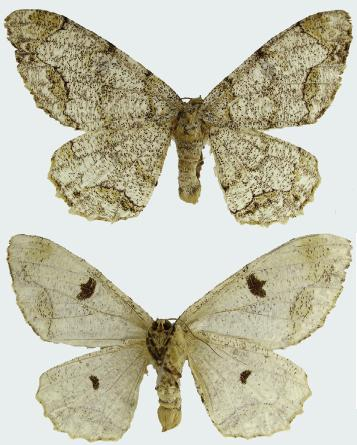
Female, upperside and underside

== Description ==
The wingspan of the male is 60–70 mm and the female is 74–80 mm. The proboscis is more developed. Frons less hairy. Hind tibia with the first pair of spurs medial. Wings with the outer margins non-crenulate. Antennae of male bipectinate (comb like on both sides) with short stiff branches. Body grey with black irrorations (sprinklings). Head ochreous. Thorax and abdomen with yellow bars. Forewings with waved yellow antemedial band. Both wings with irregularly sinuous indistinct yellow medial line curved outward beyond the cell of forewings. There is an ill-defined postmedial maculate band angled at vein 5 of both wings, with some outer margin of forewing. A marginal yellow spots series present.

Larva dark green with dark somital bands and slight sub-lateral line. Spiracles white ringed with red and red centers. Tubercle on first somite and legs purple. Female larva much pale green. Larva known to feed on Cassia auriculata, Acacia, Albizia, Camellia sinensis, Chrysanthemum indicum, Dalbergia latifolia, Eucalyptus, Litchi chinensis, Mangifera indica, Paulownia tomentosa, Phyllanthus emblica, Prunus domestica, Prunus salicina, Psidium guajava, and Vernicia fordii.

== Attack and prevention ==
Caterpillars of tea loopers are minor pests of many cultivated crops. Infected plants show symptoms similar to Ectropis bhurmitra. Leaves are bored and sometimes cut along the margins in a characteristic way. Damage from late instars show heavy dieback and complete leaf senescence. Damage occurs mostly during the night and early mornings. They rest on twigs and branches during the day.

Adults are usually trapped by light and pheromone traps. Caterpillars and pupa can removed by hand picking. Many biological parasites and diseases readily control the damage from the tea looper in India and Sri Lanka, but outbreaks can be seen with pesticide use. Parasitoid Apanteles are excellent example. In China, nuclear polyhedrosis virus extracts are used extensively, which is host specific. Bacillus thuringiensis and its strain B. thuringiensis var. kurstaki are also used by farmers in Assam, India.

Chemical control is common in any regions with heavy attack. DDT, BHC (Lindane) or Parathion are effective measures.
