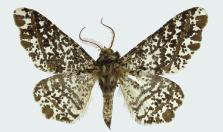
- Male

Scientific classification
- Kingdom: Animalia
- Phylum: Arthropoda
- Class: Insecta
- Order: Lepidoptera
- Family: Geometridae
- Genus: Biston
- Species: B. brevipennata

Binomial name
- Biston brevipennata Inoue, 1982

= Biston brevipennata =

Species of moth

Biston brevipennata is a moth of the family Geometridae. It is found in China (Tibet) and Nepal.
