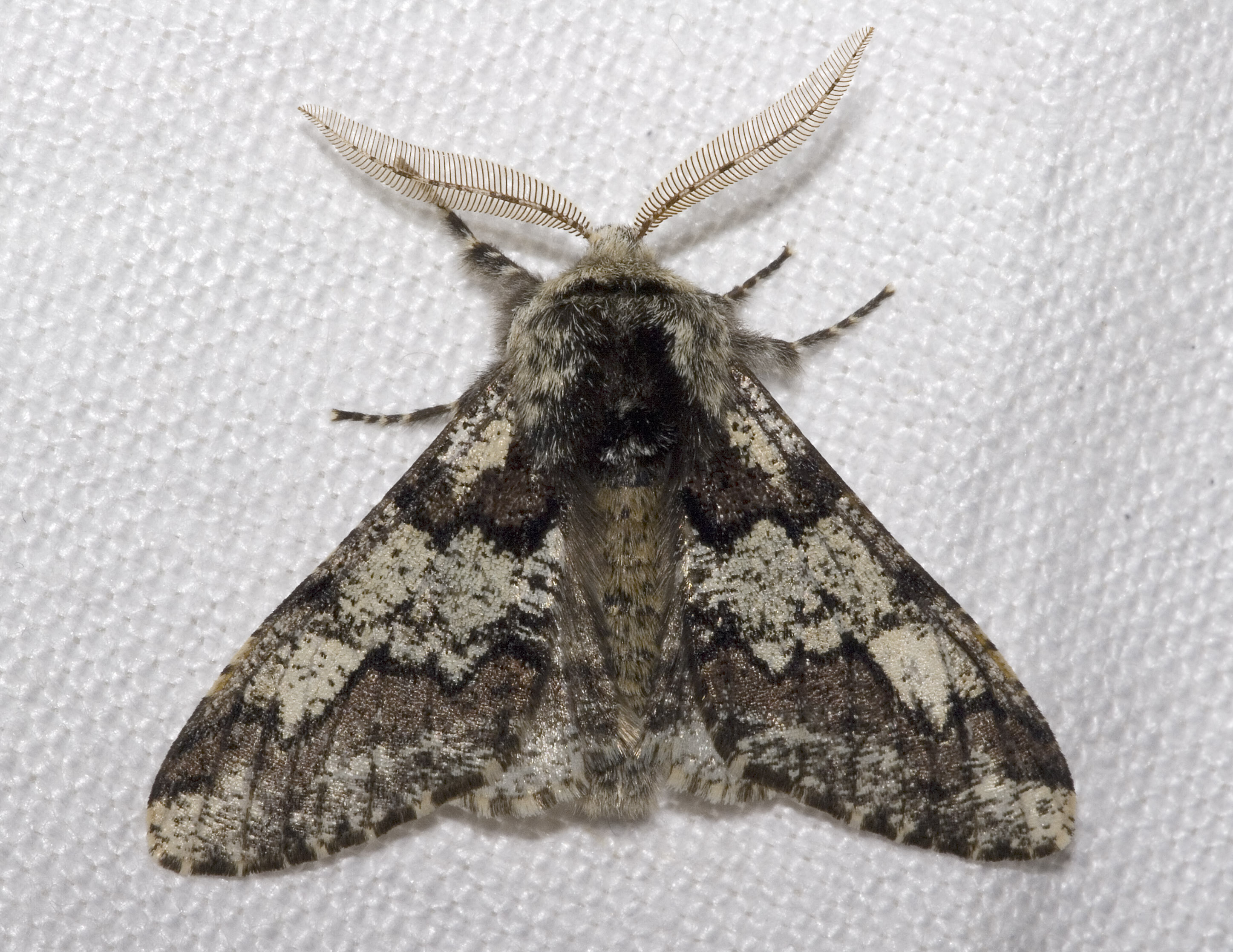
- Oak beauty, Biston strataria

Scientific classification
- Domain: Eukaryota
- Kingdom: Animalia
- Phylum: Arthropoda
- Class: Insecta
- Order: Lepidoptera
- Family: Geometridae
- Tribe: Bistonini
- Genus: Biston; Leach, 1815

Synonyms
- Dasyphara Billberg, 1820; Pachys Hübner, 1822; Eubyja Hübner, 1825; Amphidasis Treitschke, 1825; Amphidasys Sodoffsky, 1837; Amphidasea Unger, 1856; Buzura Walker, 1863; Culcula Moore, 1888; Eubyjodonta Warren, 1893; Blepharoctenia Warren, 1894; Epamraica Matsumura, 1910

= Biston (moth) =

Genus of moths

Biston is a genus of large, long-winged moths belonging to the family Geometridae. It is most notable for containing the well-known peppered moth. The genus was first described by William Elford Leach in 1815.

== Distribution ==
The species of Biston are widely distributed in Holarctic, Oriental, and Ethiopian regions.

== Description ==
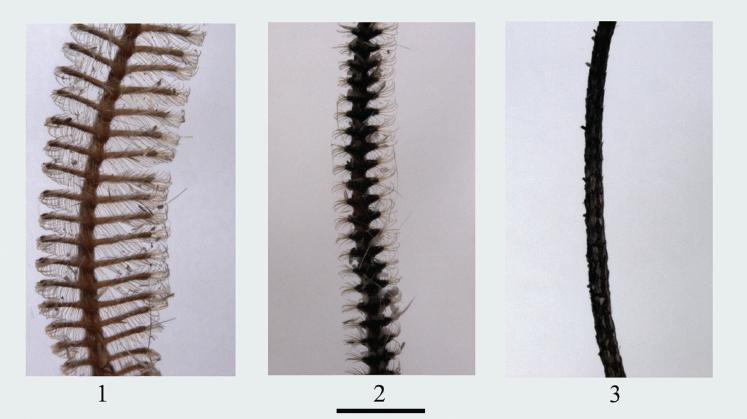
Antennae of Biston species. 1 bipectinate, with long rami (male of Biston melacron) 2 bipectinate, with short rami (male of Biston thibetaria) 3 filiform (female of Biston betularia). Scale bar = 1 mm

In 1895, British entomologist George Hampson described characteristics of the genus as follows:

"Its palpi are short and hairy. The thorax is stout and clothed with a thick pile. Its legs are hairy. The hind tibia are not dilated and have slight spurs. The forewings have rounded apexes and oblique outer margins. Vein 3 from near angle of cell. Veins 7 to 9 stalked from near the upper angle, and veins 10 and 11 stalked, where 10 often connected with veins 8 and 9. Hindwings with long cells and vein 3 from the angle."

== Diversity ==
The genus currently contains 54 species and 40 subspecies.

== Species ==
Species include:

- Biston achyra Wehrli, 1936
- Biston bengaliaria (Guenée, 1857)
- Biston betularia (Linnaeus, 1758) – peppered moth
- Biston brevipennata Inoue, 1982
- Biston bura (Warren, 1894)
- Biston contectaria (Walker, 1863)
- Biston exalbescens Inoue, 2000
- Biston falcata (Warren, 1893)
- Biston giganteus Inoue
- Biston hypoleucus Kuznetsov, 1901
- Biston inouei Holloway, 1993
- Biston insularis (Warren, 1894)
- Biston marginata Shiraki, 1913
- Biston mediolata Jiang, Nan, Dayong Xue & Hongxiang Han, 2011
- Biston melacron Wehrli, 1941
- Biston multidentata (Guedet, 1941)
- Biston panterinaria (Bremer & Grey, 1853)
- Biston pelidna Prout
- Biston perclara (Warren, 1899)
- Biston pustulata (Warren, 1896)
- Biston quercii (Oberthür, 1910)
- Biston regalis (Moore, 1888)
- Biston robustum Butler, 1879
- Biston strataria (Hufnagel, 1767) – oak beauty
- Biston subregalis Inoue
- Biston suppressaria (Guenée, 1857)
- Biston thibetaria (Oberthür, 1886)
- Biston thoracicarius (Oberthür, 1884)
- Biston tianschanicus Wehrli, 1940
