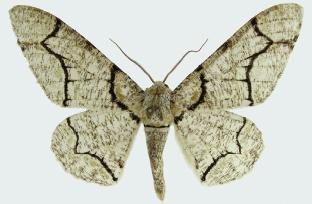
- Male
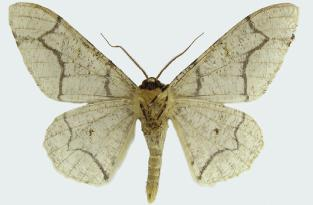
- Female

Scientific classification
- Kingdom: Animalia
- Phylum: Arthropoda
- Class: Insecta
- Order: Lepidoptera
- Family: Geometridae
- Genus: Biston
- Species: B. contectaria

Binomial name
- Biston contectaria (Walker, 1863)

Synonyms
- Amphidasis contectaria Walker, 1863; Biston (Cusiala) bengaliaria f. contectaria

= Biston contectaria =

Species of moth

Biston contectaria is a moth of the family Geometridae. It is found in China (Yunnan), India and Nepal.
