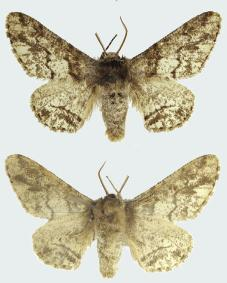
- Male, upperside and underside

Scientific classification
- Domain: Eukaryota
- Kingdom: Animalia
- Phylum: Arthropoda
- Class: Insecta
- Order: Lepidoptera
- Family: Geometridae
- Genus: Biston
- Species: B. marginata

Binomial name
- Biston marginata Shiraki, 1913

Synonyms
- Biston fragilis Inoue, 1958

= Biston marginata =

Species of moth

Biston marginata is a moth of the family Geometridae. It is found in China (Zhejiang, Jiangxi, Hunan, Fujian, Guangdong, Guangxi, Chongqing, Yunnan), Taiwan, Japan and Vietnam.

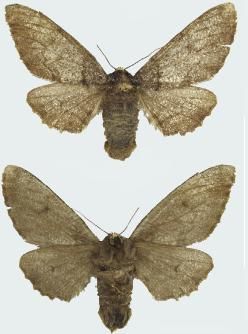
Female, upperside and underside
