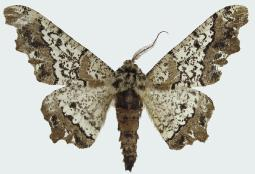
- Male
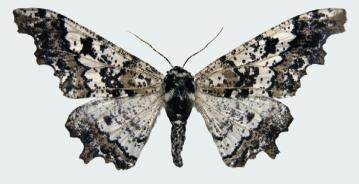
- Female

Scientific classification
- Domain: Eukaryota
- Kingdom: Animalia
- Phylum: Arthropoda
- Class: Insecta
- Order: Lepidoptera
- Family: Geometridae
- Genus: Biston
- Species: B. quercii

Binomial name
- Biston quercii (Oberthür, 1910)

Synonyms
- Amphidasis quercii Oberthür, 1910; Biston (Eubyjodonta) quercii

= Biston quercii =

Species of moth

Biston quercii is a moth of the family Geometridae. It is found in China (Henan, Shaanxi, Gansu, Hubei, Sichuan).
