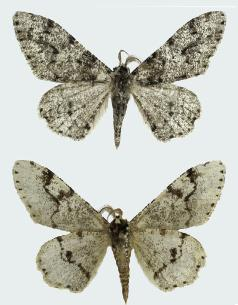
- Male, upperside and underside

Scientific classification
- Domain: Eukaryota
- Kingdom: Animalia
- Phylum: Arthropoda
- Class: Insecta
- Order: Lepidoptera
- Family: Geometridae
- Genus: Biston
- Species: B. melacron

Binomial name
- Biston melacron Wehrli, 1941

Synonyms
- Biston exotica Inoue, 1977

= Biston melacron =

Species of moth

Biston melacron is a moth of the family Geometridae. It is found in China (Zhejiang, Jiangxi, Fujian, Taiwan, Sichuan), Japan and South Korea.
