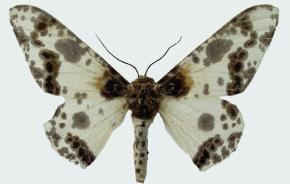
- Subspecies panterinaria male
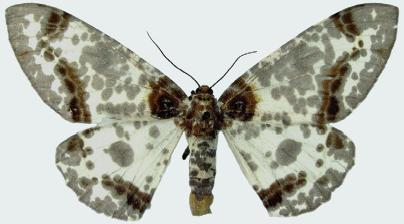
- Subspecies panterinaria female

Scientific classification
- Domain: Eukaryota
- Kingdom: Animalia
- Phylum: Arthropoda
- Class: Insecta
- Order: Lepidoptera
- Family: Geometridae
- Genus: Biston
- Species: B. panterinaria

Binomial name
- Biston panterinaria (Bremer & Grey, 1853)

Synonyms
- Amphidasis panterinaria Bremer & Grey, 1853; Culcula panterinaria; Buzura abraxata Leech, 1889; Culcula panterinaria lienpingensis Wehrli, 1939; Culcula panterinaria szechuanensis Wehrli, 1939

= Biston panterinaria =

Species of moth

Biston panterinaria is a moth of the family Geometridae. It is found in China (Liaoning, Beijing, Hebei, Shanxi, Shandong, Henan, Shaanxi, Ningxia, Gansu, Anhui, Zhejiang, Hubei, Jiangxi, Hunan, Fujian, Guangdong, Hainan, Guangxi, Sichuan, Guizhou, Yunnan, Tibet), India, Nepal, Sikkim, Vietnam and Thailand.

Adults mimic the pattern of distasteful or poisonous species of the genus Abraxas. The wings are white and scattered with pale grey markings, which are rarely present basally of the hindwing postmedial line. The base of the forewing is grey and has a large brown patch, accompanied by a yellowish brown antemedial line.

== Subspecies ==
- Biston panterinaria panterinaria (northern China)
- Biston panterinaria sychnospilas (Prout, 1930) (Japan)
- Biston panterinaria exanthemata (Moore, 1888) (India, Nepal, Vietnam, Thailand, Yunnan and Tibet)
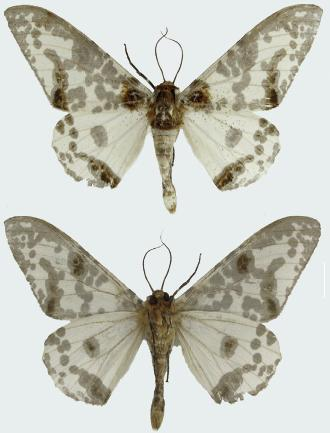
Subspecies exanthemata male, upperside and underside

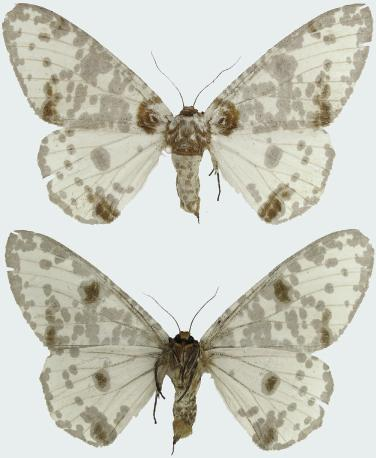
Subspecies exanthemata female, upperside and underside

Biston panterinaria lienpingensis (Guangdong, China), Biston panterinaria szechuanensis (Sichuan, China) and Biston panterinaria abraxata (Jiangxi, China) are now considered synonyms of Biston panterinaria panterinaria.

== Gallery ==
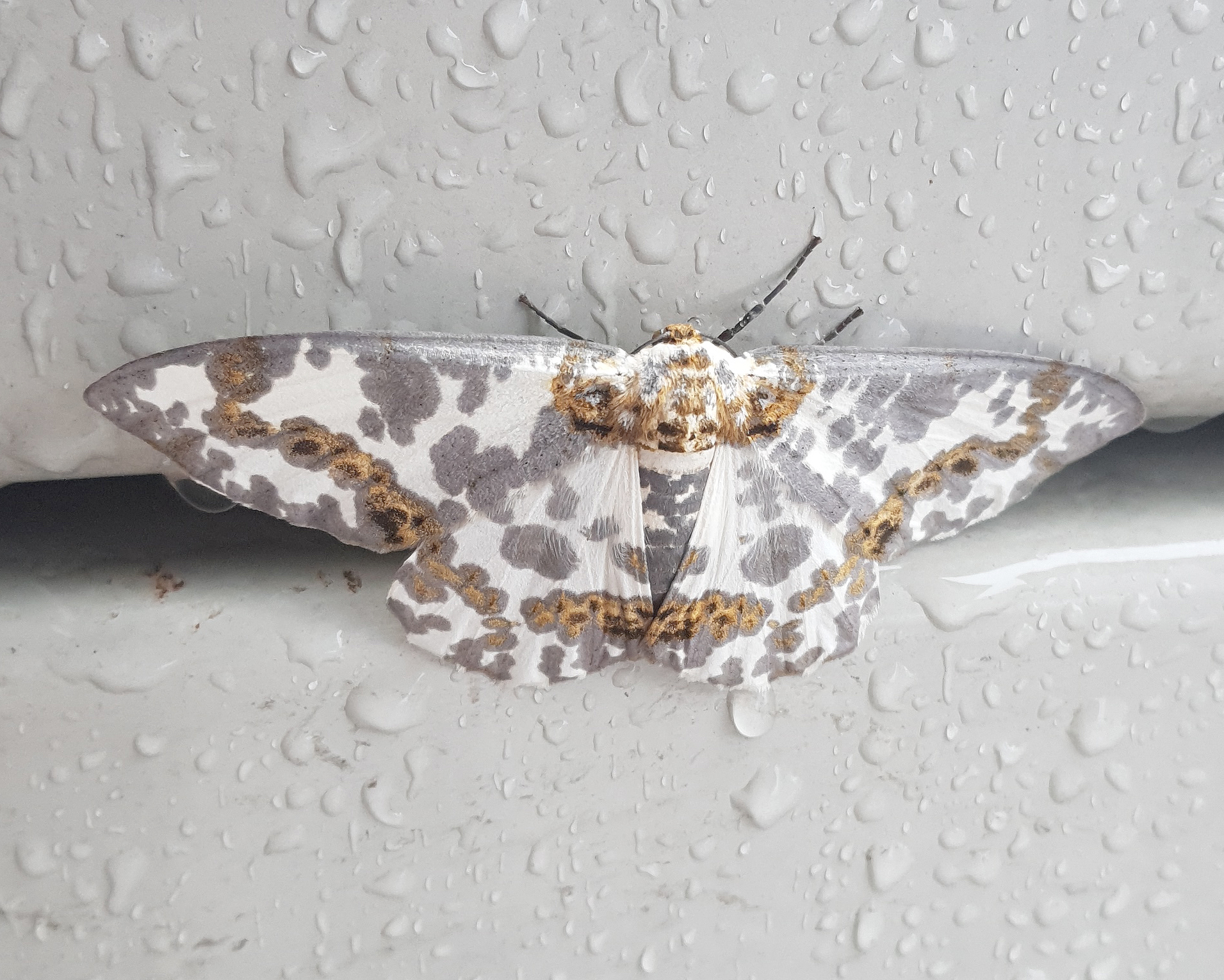
Live Biston panterinaria in South Korea
