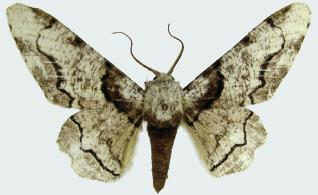
- Male
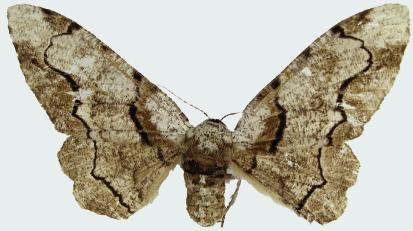
- Female

Scientific classification
- Domain: Eukaryota
- Kingdom: Animalia
- Phylum: Arthropoda
- Class: Insecta
- Order: Lepidoptera
- Family: Geometridae
- Genus: Biston
- Species: B. regalis

Binomial name
- Biston regalis (Moore, 1888)

Synonyms
- Amphidasys regalis Moore, 1888; Eubyjodonta comitata Warren, 1899

= Biston regalis =

Species of moth

Biston regalis is a moth of the family Geometridae. It is found in China (Liaoning, Henan, Shaanxi, Gansu, Zhejiang, Hubei, Jiangxi, Hunan, Fujian, Hainan, Sichuan, Yunnan), Taiwan, Russia (Amur, Ussuri), Japan, North Korea, South Korea, India, Nepal, the Philippines, Pakistan and the United States.

== Subspecies ==
- Biston regalis regalis
- Biston regalis comitata (Warren, 1899)
