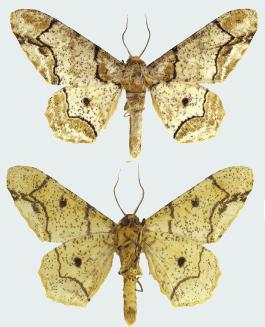
- Male, upperside and underside

Scientific classification
- Kingdom: Animalia
- Phylum: Arthropoda
- Class: Insecta
- Order: Lepidoptera
- Family: Geometridae
- Genus: Biston
- Species: B. bengaliaria

Binomial name
- Biston bengaliaria (Guenée, 1858)

Synonyms
- Amphidasis bengaliaria Guenée, 1858; Blepharoctenia bengaliaria; Biston (Cusiala) bengaliaria

= Biston bengaliaria =

Species of moth

Biston bengaliaria is a moth of the family Geometridae. It is found in China (Yunnan, Tibet), India, Bengal and Thailand.

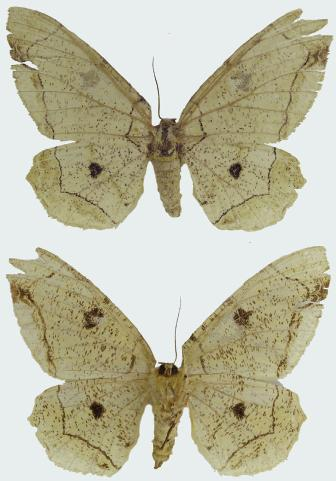
Female, upperside and underside
