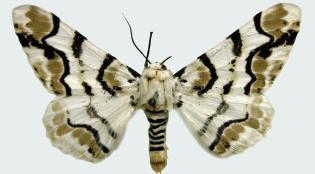
- Male
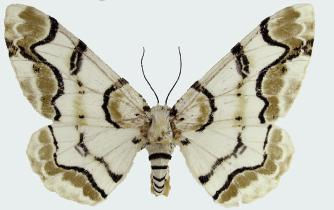
- Female

Scientific classification
- Domain: Eukaryota
- Kingdom: Animalia
- Phylum: Arthropoda
- Class: Insecta
- Order: Lepidoptera
- Family: Geometridae
- Genus: Biston
- Species: B. thibetaria

Binomial name
- Biston thibetaria (Oberthür, 1886)

Synonyms
- Amphidasys thibetaria Oberthür, 1886; Buzura thibetaria; Buzura (Blepharoctenia) thibetaria

= Biston thibetaria =

Species of moth

Biston thibetaria is a moth of the family Geometridae. It is found in China (Henan, Zhejiang, Hubei, Hunan, Fujian, Guangxi, Sichuan, Guizhou, Yunnan, Tibet).
