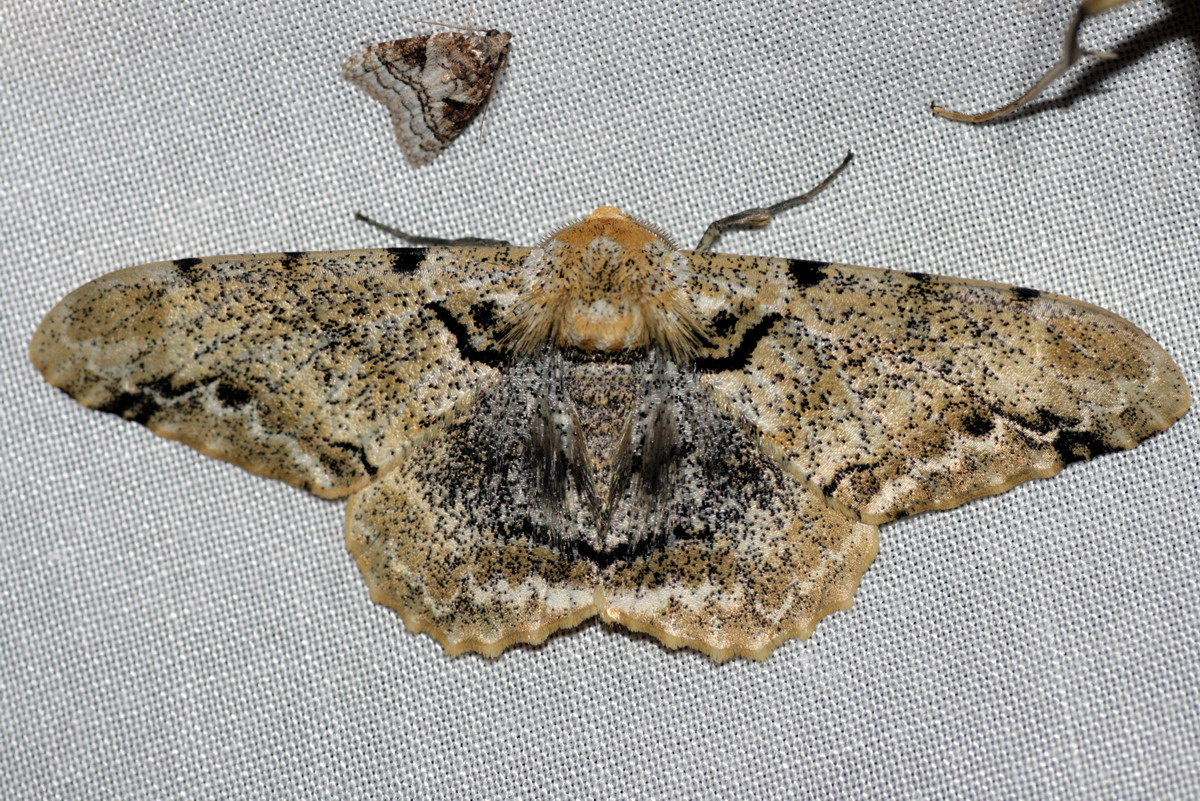

Scientific classification
- Domain: Eukaryota
- Kingdom: Animalia
- Phylum: Arthropoda
- Class: Insecta
- Order: Lepidoptera
- Family: Geometridae
- Genus: Biston
- Species: B. insularis

Binomial name
- Biston insularis (Warren, 1894)

Synonyms
- Blepharoctenia insularis Warren, 1894; Blepharoctenia arenosa Warren, 1894; Buzura eximia Swinhoe, 1902; Buzura insularis illucescens Prout, 1928; Buzura insularis Warren; Barlow, 1982

= Biston insularis =

Species of moth

Biston insularis is a moth of the family Geometridae. It is found in Sundaland.
