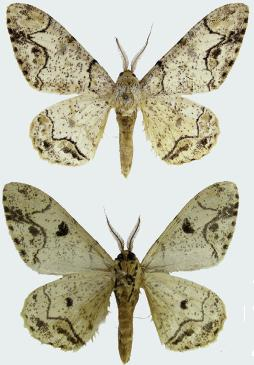
- Male, upperside and underside

Scientific classification
- Domain: Eukaryota
- Kingdom: Animalia
- Phylum: Arthropoda
- Class: Insecta
- Order: Lepidoptera
- Family: Geometridae
- Genus: Biston
- Species: B. pustulata

Binomial name
- Biston pustulata (Warren, 1896)

Synonyms
- Buzura pustulata Warren, 1896

= Biston pustulata =

Species of moth

Biston pustulata is a moth of the family Geometridae first described by William Warren in 1896. It is found in Hainan in China, southern Thailand, Peninsular Malaysia and Sundaland.

The larvae have been recorded feeding on Acacia mangium and Gliricidia species.
