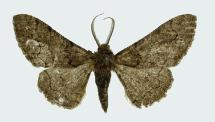
- Male
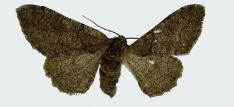
- Female

Scientific classification
- Domain: Eukaryota
- Kingdom: Animalia
- Phylum: Arthropoda
- Class: Insecta
- Order: Lepidoptera
- Family: Geometridae
- Genus: Biston
- Species: B. thoracicaria

Binomial name
- Biston thoracicaria (Oberthür, 1884)

Synonyms
- Jankowskia thoracicaria Oberthür, 1884; Lycia tortuosa Wileman, 1911

= Biston thoracicaria =

Species of moth

Biston thoracicaria is a species of moth in the family Geometridae. It is found in China (Beijing, Hebei, Shandong, Henan, Shaanxi, Gansu, Jiangsu, Zhejiang, Hubei, Yunnan), Russia, Japan, North Korea and South Korea.
