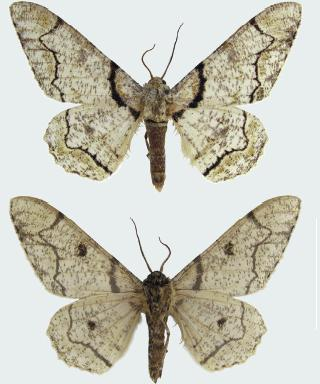
- Male, upperside and underside

Scientific classification
- Domain: Eukaryota
- Kingdom: Animalia
- Phylum: Arthropoda
- Class: Insecta
- Order: Lepidoptera
- Family: Geometridae
- Genus: Biston
- Species: B. mediolata

Binomial name
- Biston mediolata Jiang, Nan, Dayong Xue & Hongxiang Han, 2011

= Biston mediolata =

Species of moth

Biston mediolata is a moth of the family Geometridae. It is found in China (Shaanxi, Gansu, Hubei, Hunan, Fujian, Hainan, Guangxi, Sichuan) and Vietnam.

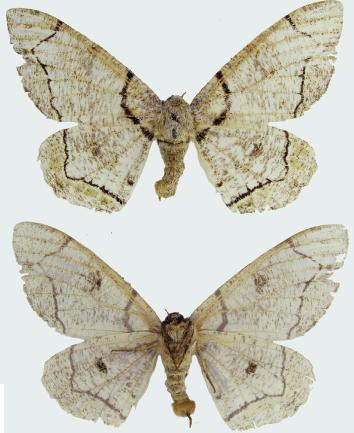
Female, upperside and underside
