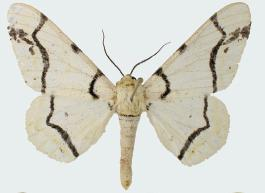
- Male
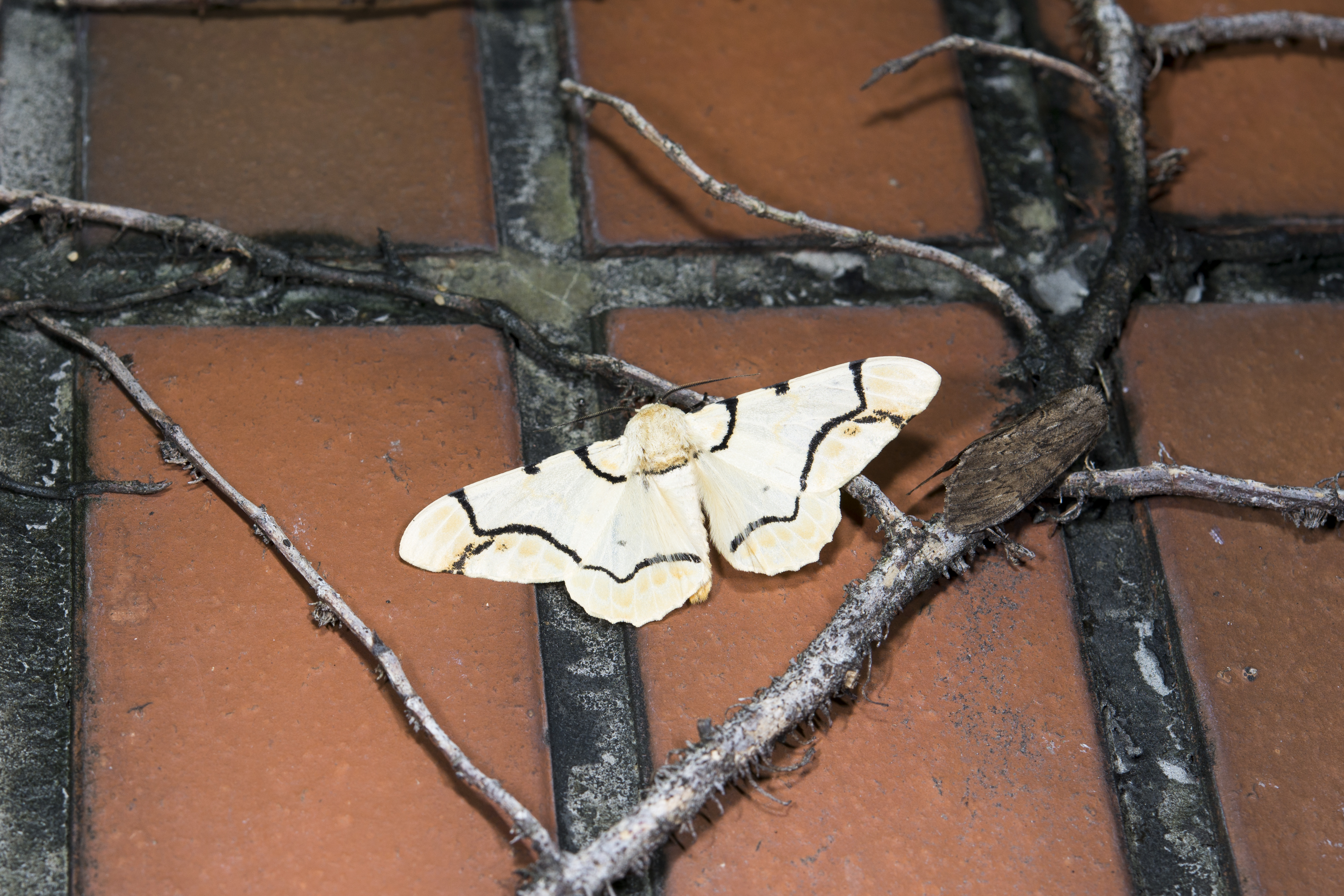

Scientific classification
- Domain: Eukaryota
- Kingdom: Animalia
- Phylum: Arthropoda
- Class: Insecta
- Order: Lepidoptera
- Family: Geometridae
- Genus: Biston
- Species: B. perclara

Binomial name
- Biston perclara (Warren, 1899)

Synonyms
- Blepharoctenia perclara Warren, 1899; Cusiala bengaliaria cerea Bastelberger, 1909; Epamraica bilineata Matsumura, 1910

= Biston perclara =

Species of moth

Biston perclara is a moth of the family Geometridae. It is found in Taiwan and Japan.
