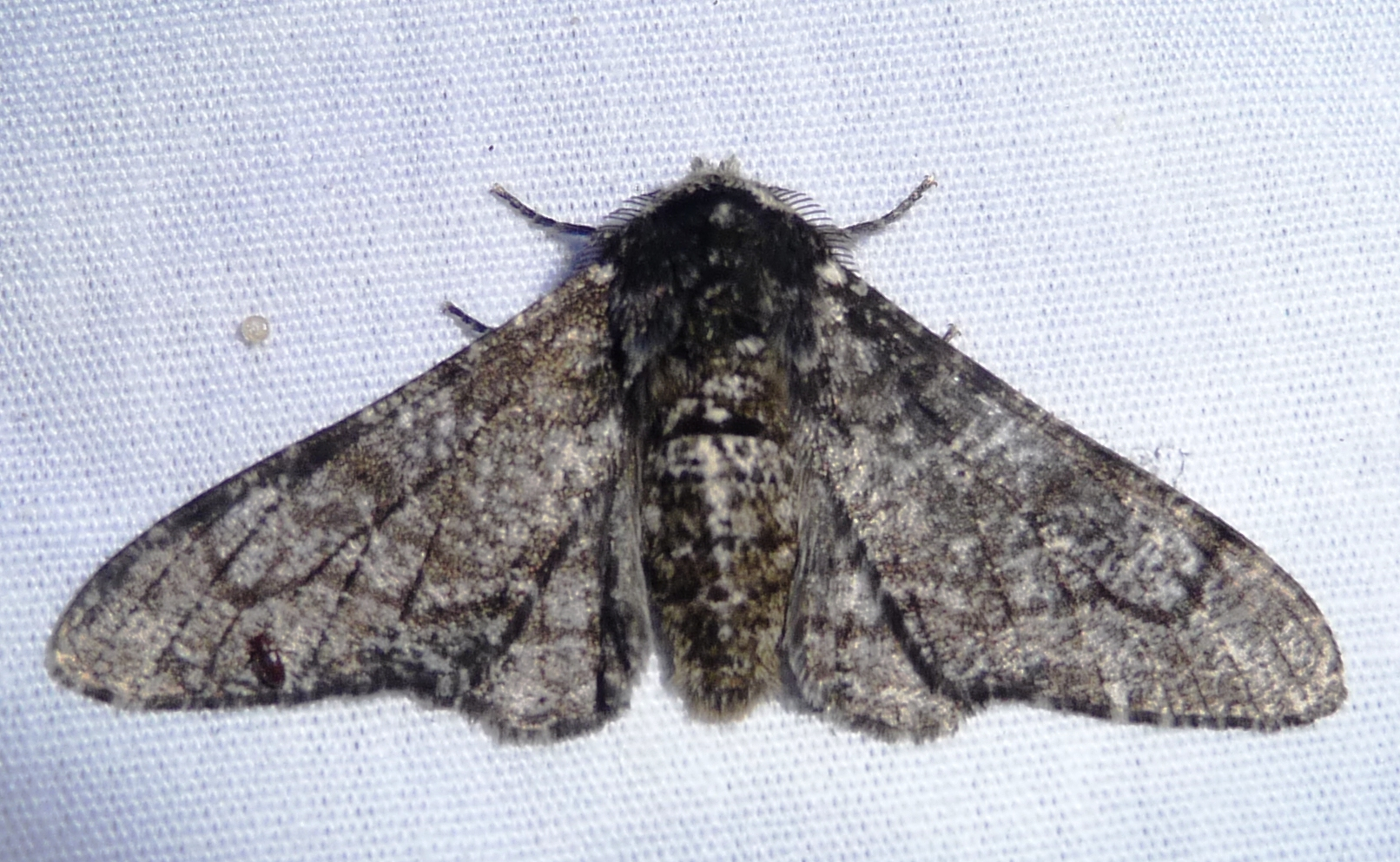
- Male
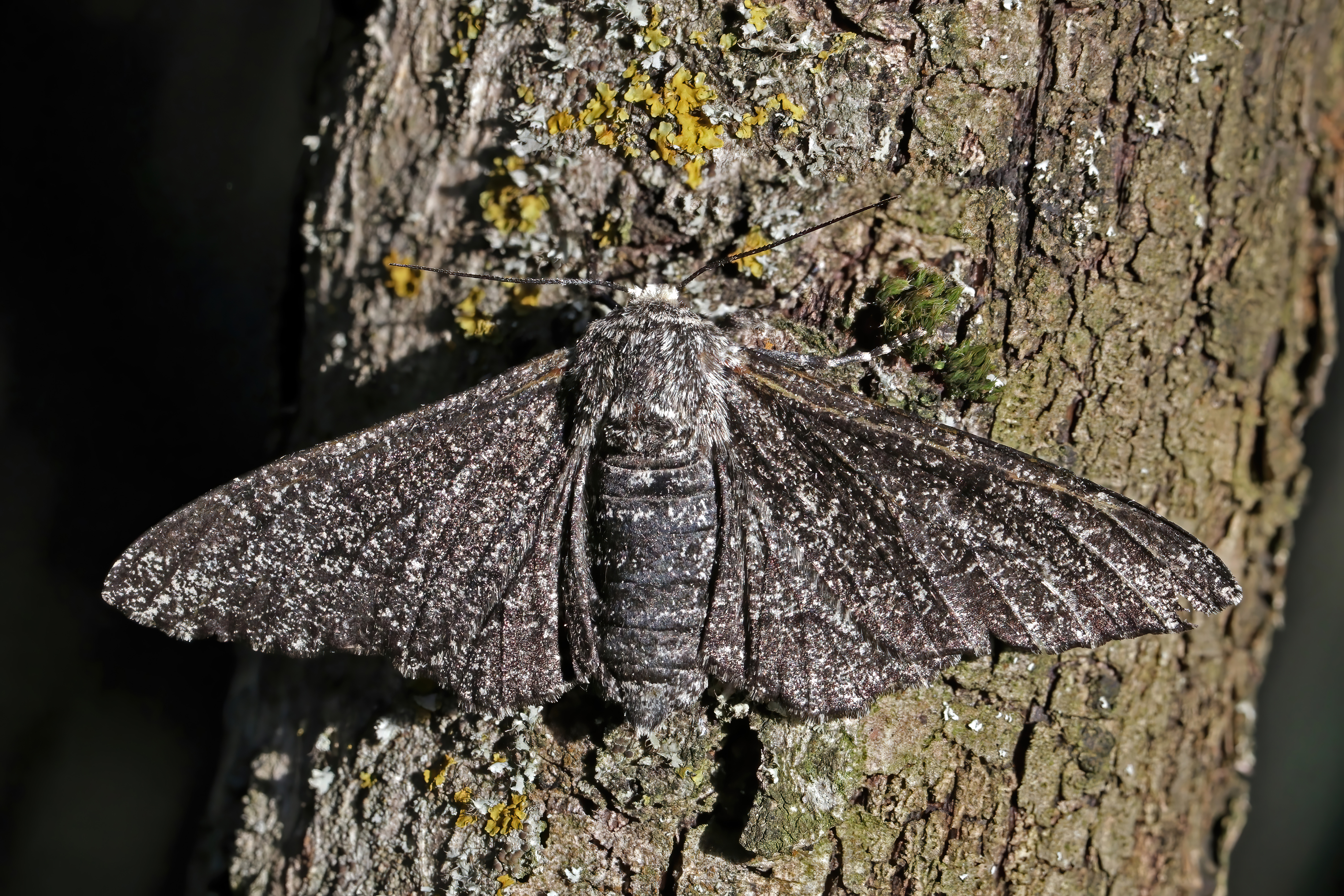
- Female

Scientific classification
- Kingdom: Animalia
- Phylum: Arthropoda
- Clade: Pancrustacea
- Class: Insecta
- Order: Lepidoptera
- Family: Geometridae
- Genus: Biston
- Species: B. betularia

Binomial name
- Biston betularia Linnaeus, 1758

Subspecies
- B. b. alexandrina (Wehrli, 1941); B. b. betularia; B. b. cognataria (Guenée, 1857); B. b. contrasta (Barnes & Benjamin, 1923); B. b. parva (Leech, 1897); B. b. nepalensis (Inoue, 1982)

Synonyms
- Phalaena (Geometra) betularia Linnaeus, 1758; Phalaena (Noctua) p-graecum (Poda, 1761); marmoraria (Sepp, 1792); Phalaena (Geometra) ulmaria (Borkhausen, 1794); Eubyja betularia; Amphidasis huberaria (Ballion, 1866); Amphidasys betularia var. doubledayaria (Millière, 1870); Eurbyjodonta concinna (Warren, 1899); Biston cognataria alexandrina (Wehrli, 1941); Biston (Eubyjodonta) huberaria (tienschana Wehrli, 1941); Biston cognataria sinitibetica (Wehrli, 1941)

= Peppered moth =

Species of moth

The peppered moth (Biston betularia) is a moth of the family Geometridae. It is night flying, and found mainly in temperate regions of the northern hemisphere. Peppered moth evolution is an example of population genetics and natural selection.

The caterpillars of the peppered moth not only mimic the form but also the colour of a twig. Recent research indicates that the caterpillars can sense the twig's colour with their skin and match their body colour to the background to protect themselves from predators.

== Description ==
The wingspan ranges from 45 to 62 mm (1.8 to 2.4 in) with a median of 55 mm (2.2 in). It is relatively stout-bodied, with forewings relatively narrow-elongate. The wings are white, "peppered" with black, and with more-or-less distinct cross lines, also black. These transverse wing lines and "peppered" maculation (spotting) can also, in rare instances, be grey or brown; the spotting pattern, in particularly very rare cases, is sometimes a combination of brown and black/grey. The black speckling varies in amount, in some examples it is almost absent, whilst in others it is so dense that the wings appear to be black sprinkled with white. The antennae of males are strongly bipectinate. Prout (1912–16) gives an account of the forms and congeners.

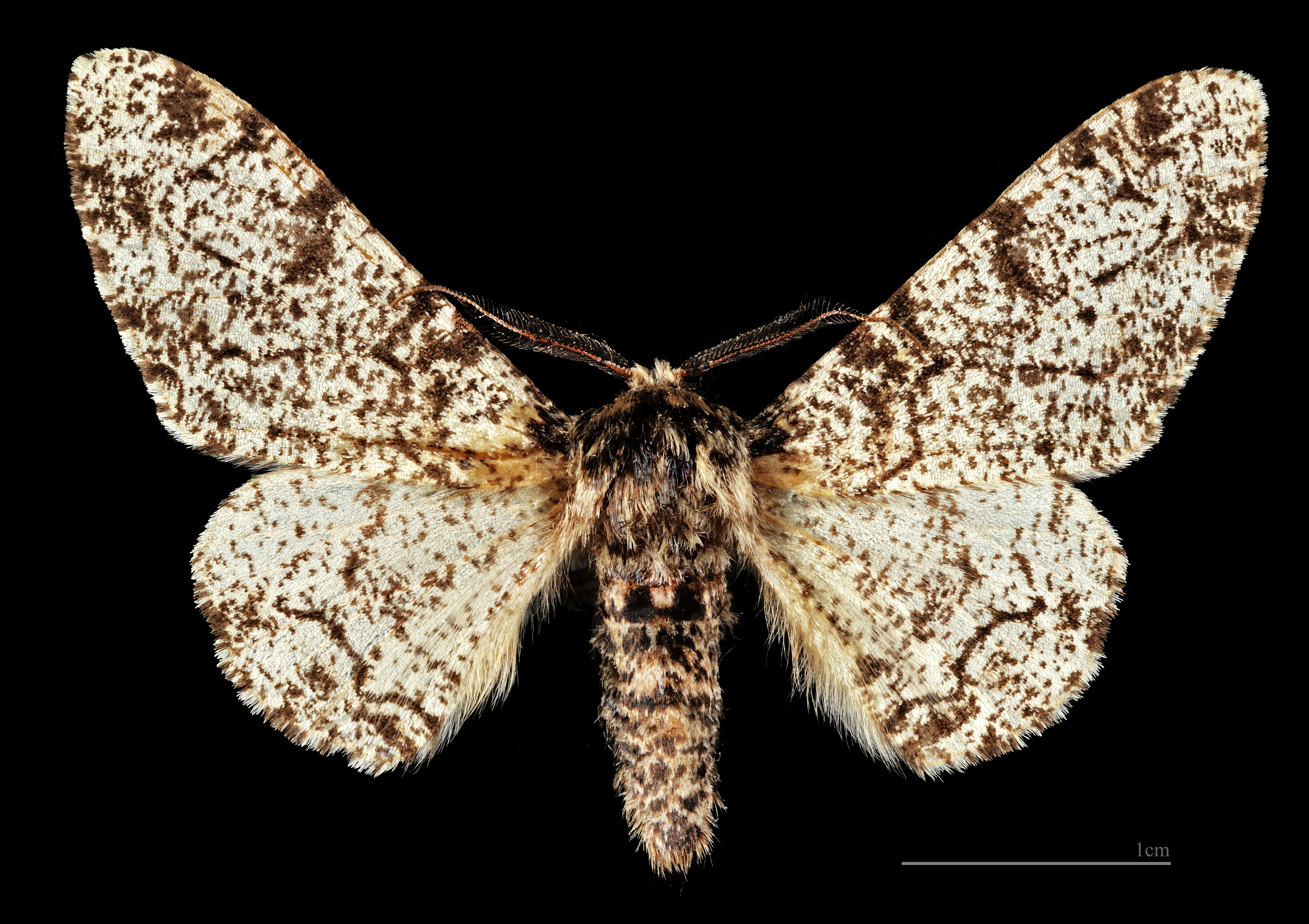
Biston betularia ♂

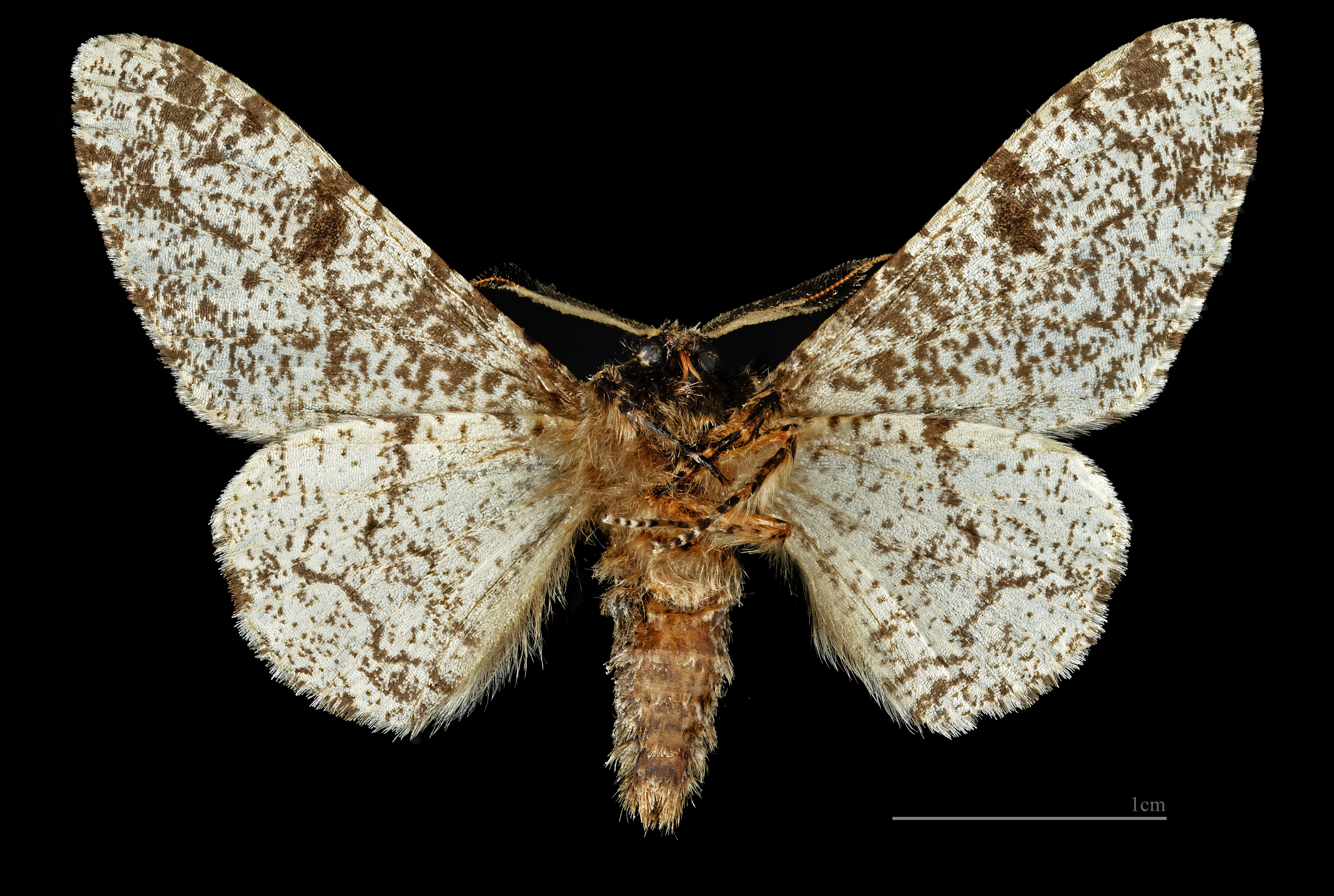
Biston betularia ♂ △

== Distribution ==
Biston betularia is found in China (Heilongjiang, Jilin, Inner Mongolia, Beijing, Hebei, Shanxi, Shandong, Henan, Shaanxi, Ningxia, Gansu, Qinghai, Xinjiang, Fujian, Sichuan, Yunnan, Tibet), Russia, Mongolia, Japan, North Korea, South Korea, Nepal, Kazakhstan, Kyrgyzstan, Turkmenistan, Georgia, Azerbaijan, Armenia, Europe and North America.

== Ecology and life cycle ==
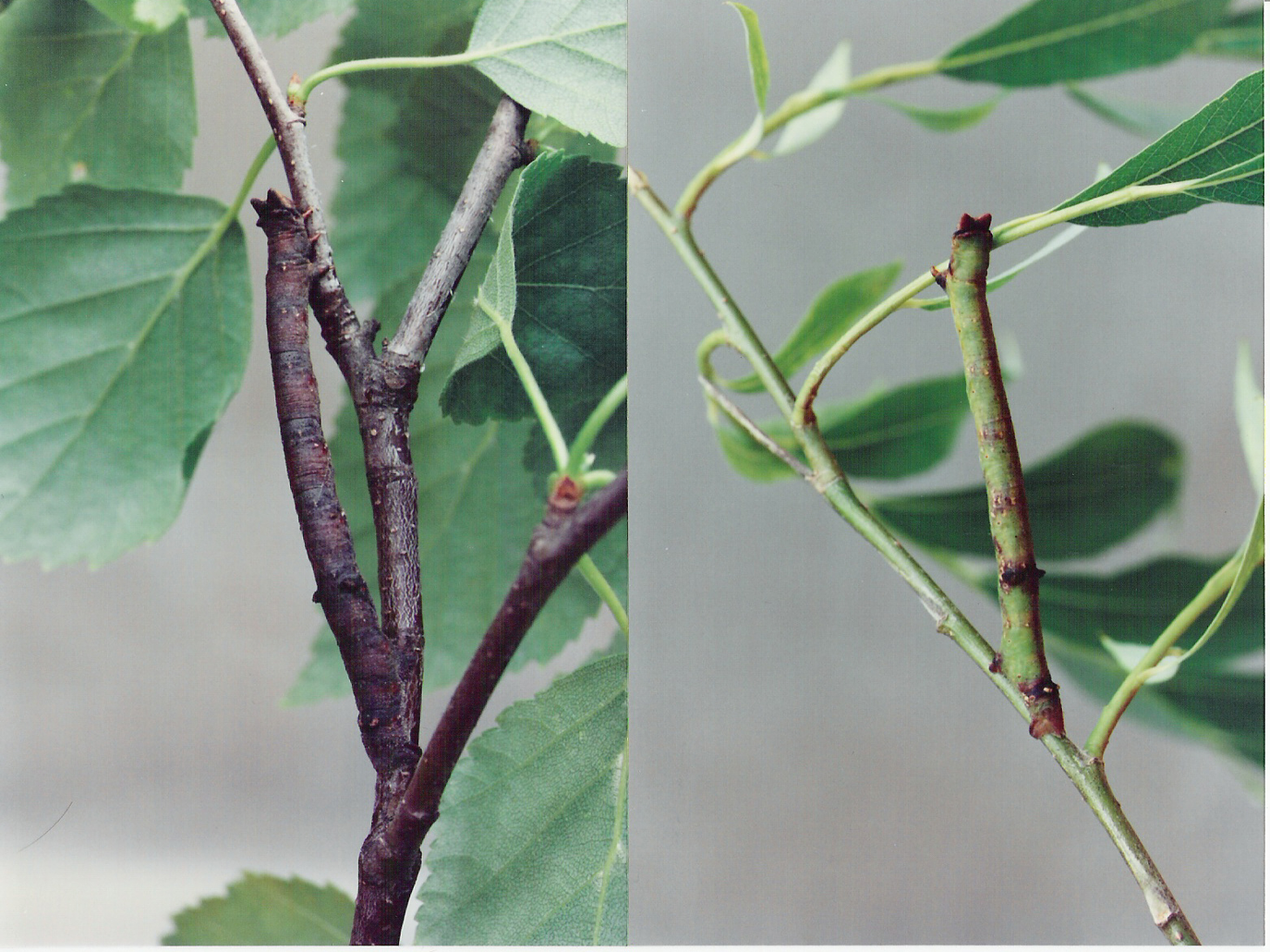
Biston betularia caterpillars on birch (left) and willow (right), demonstrating twig mimicry and effective countershading.

In Great Britain and Ireland, the peppered moth is univoltine (i.e., it has one generation per year), whilst in south-eastern North America it is bivoltine (two generations per year). The lepidopteran life cycle consists of four stages: ova (eggs), several larval instars (caterpillars), pupae, which overwinter in the soil, and imagines (adults). During the day, the moths typically rest on trees, where they are preyed on by birds.

The caterpillar is a twig mimic, varying in colour between green and brown. On a historical note, it was one of the first animals to be identified as being camouflaged with countershading to make it appear flat (shading being the main visual cue that makes things appear solid), in a paper by Edward Bagnall Poulton in 1887. Research indicates that the caterpillars can sense the twig's colour with their skin and match their body colour to the background to protect themselves from predators, an ability to camouflage themselves also found in cephalopods, chameleons and some fish, although this colour change is rather slower in the caterpillars.

It goes into the soil late in the season, where it pupates in order to spend the winter. The imagines emerge from the pupae between late May and August, the males slightly before the females (this is common and expected from sexual selection). They emerge late in the day and dry their wings before flying that night.

The males fly every night of their lives in search of females, whereas the females only fly on the first night. Thereafter, the females release pheromones to attract males. Since the pheromone is carried by the wind, males tend to travel up the concentration gradient, i.e., toward the source. During flight, they are subject to predation by bats. The males guard the female from other males until she lays the eggs. The female lays about 2,000 pale-green ovoid eggs about 1 mm in length into crevices in bark with her ovipositor.

=== Resting behaviour ===
Resting position of peppered moths (1964–1985). Total number of moths 109.
1. Exposed trunk 32 (29.4%)
2. Unexposed trunk 11 (10.1%)
3. Trunk/branch joint 46 (42.2%)
4. Branches 5 (4.59%)
5. Foliage 11 (10.1%)
6. Artificial surfaces 4 (3.67%)
Resting position of peppered moths (2001–2006). Total number of moths 135.
1. Trunk 48 (35.6%)
2. Branches 70 (51.9%)
3. Twigs 17 (12.6%)

A mating pair or a lone individual will spend the day hiding from predators, particularly birds. Males stay with the female to ensure paternity. Peppered moths generally rest in the upper part of the trees at unexposed positions. They use three main types of site: (1) a few inches below a branch-trunk joint on a tree trunk where the moth is in shadow; (2) on the underside of branches; and (3) on foliate twigs. Peppered moth researcher Michael Majerus notes:

Creationist critics of the peppered moth have often pointed to a statement made by Clarke et al. (1985): "... In 25 years we have only found two betularia on the tree trunks or walls adjacent to our traps, and none elsewhere". The reason now seems obvious. Few people spend their time looking for moths up in the trees. That is where peppered moths rest by day.

Further support for these resting positions is given from experiments watching captive moths taking up resting positions in both males (Mikkola, 1979; 1984) and females (Liebert and Brakefield, 1987).

Majerus, et al., (2000) have shown that peppered moths are cryptically camouflaged against their backgrounds when they rest in the boughs of trees. It is clear that in human visible wavelengths, typica are camouflaged against lichens and carbonaria against plain bark. However, birds are capable of seeing ultraviolet light that humans cannot see. Using an ultraviolet-sensitive video camera, Majerus et al. showed that typica reflect ultraviolet light in a speckled fashion and are camouflaged against crustose lichens common on branches, both in ultraviolet and human-visible wavelengths. However, typica are not as well camouflaged against foliose lichens common on tree trunks; though they are camouflaged in human wavelengths, in ultraviolet wavelengths, foliose lichens do not reflect ultraviolet light.

During an experiment in Cambridge over the seven years 2001–2007 Majerus noted the natural resting positions of peppered moths, and of the 135 moths examined over half were on tree branches, mostly on the lower half of the branch, 37% were on tree trunks, mostly on the north side, and only 12.6% were resting on or under twigs.

== Polymorphism ==
=== Introduction on forms ===
There are several melanic and non-melanic morphs of the peppered moth. These are controlled genetically. A particular colour morph can be indicated in a standard way by following the species name in the form "morpha morph name". The use of "form" in the method of Biston betularia f. formname in detailing these variations is also a widespread practice.

These forms are often accidentally elevated to subspecies status when they appear in literature. Not adding the "f." (forma) or morpha implies that the taxon is a subspecies instead of a form, as in Biston betularia carbonaria instead of Biston betularia f. carbonaria. Rarely, forms have been elevated to species status, as in Biston carbonaria. Either of these two circumstances might lead to the erroneous belief that speciation was involved in the observed evolution of the peppered moth. This is not the case; individuals of each morph interbreed and produce fertile offspring with individuals of all other morphs; hence there is only one peppered moth species.

By contrast, different subspecies of the same species can theoretically interbreed with one another and will produce fully fertile and healthy offspring, but in practice do not, as they live in different regions or reproduce in different seasons. Full-fledged species are either unable to produce fertile and healthy offspring, or do not recognize each other's courtship signals, or both.

European breeding experiments have shown that in Biston betularia betularia, the allele for melanism producing morpha carbonaria is controlled by a single locus. The melanic allele is dominant to the non-melanic allele. This situation is, however, somewhat complicated by the presence of three other alleles that produce indistinguishable morphs of morpha medionigra. These are of intermediate dominance, but this is not complete (Majerus, 1998).

=== Form names ===
In continental Europe, there are three morphs: the white morph typica (syn. morpha/f. betularia), the dark melanistic morph carbonaria (syn. doubledayaria), and an intermediate form medionigra.

In Britain, the typical white morph is known as typica, the melanic morph is carbonaria, and the intermediate phenotype is named insularia.

In North America, the melanic black morph is morpha swettaria. In Biston betularia cognataria, the melanic allele (producing morpha swettaria) is similarly dominant to the non-melanic allele. There are also some intermediate morphs. In Japan, no melanic morphs have been recorded; they are all morpha typica.

== Evolution ==
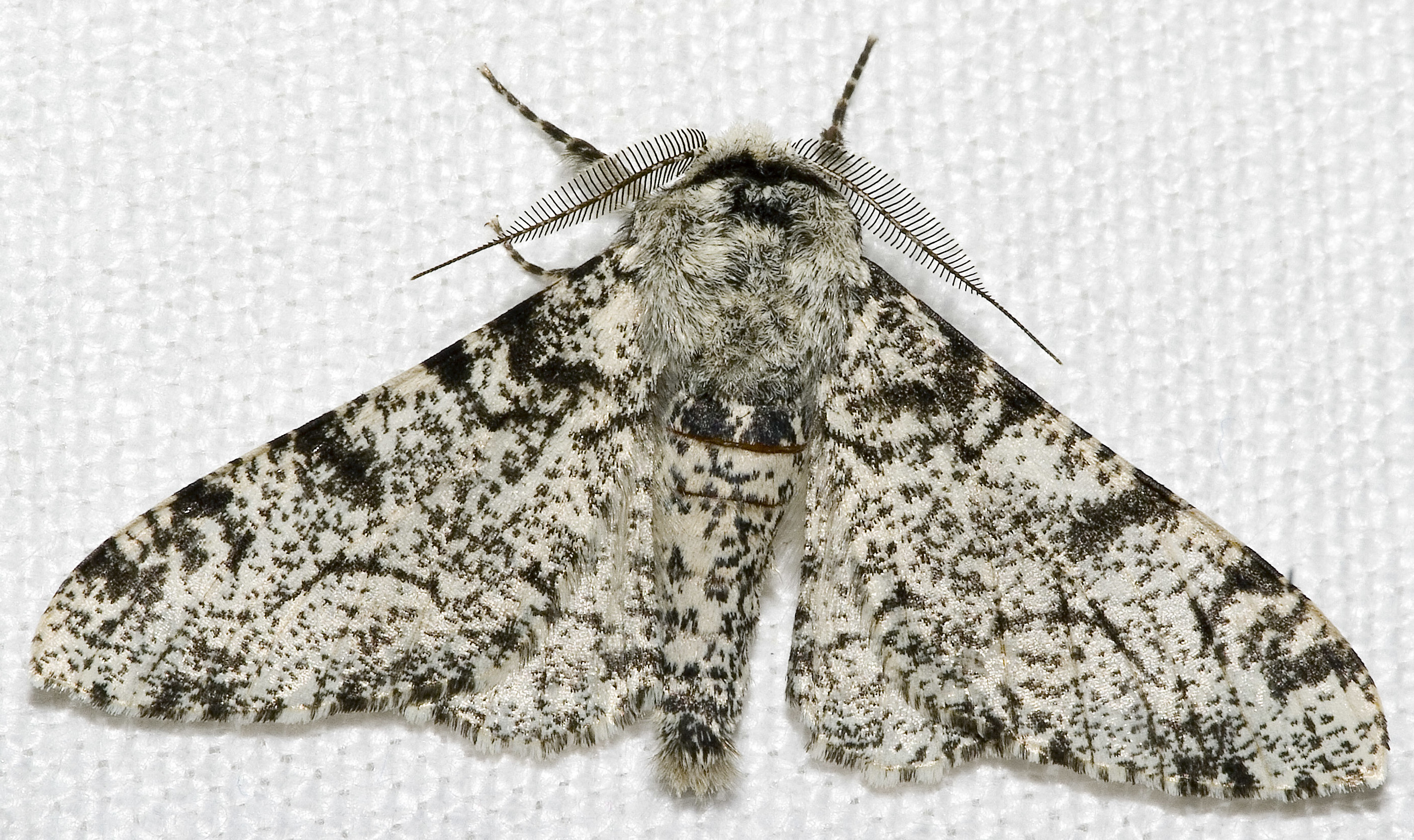
Biston betularia betularia morpha typica, the white-bodied peppered moth.

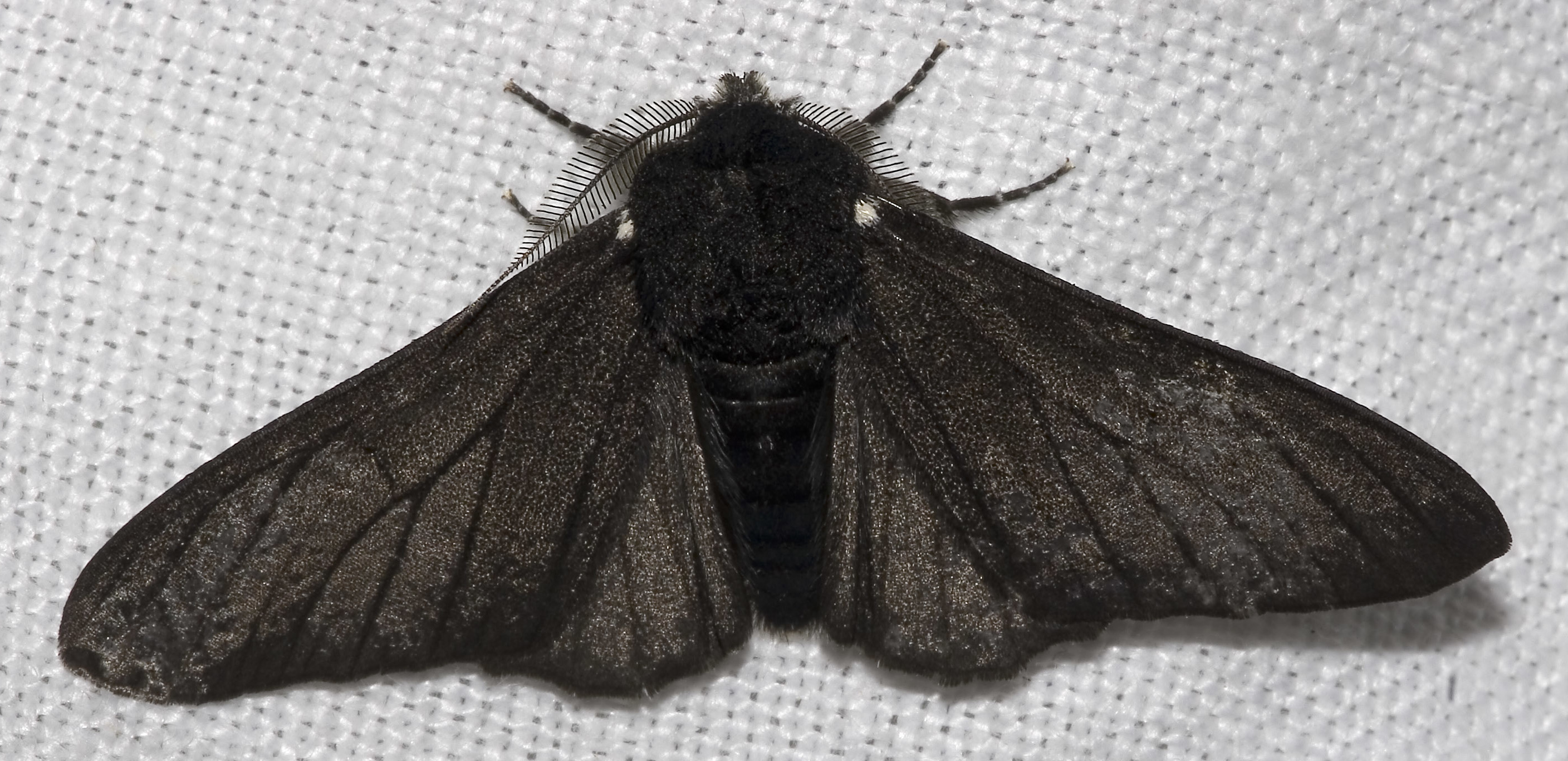
Biston betularia betularia morpha carbonaria, the black-bodied peppered moth.

The evolution of the peppered moth over the last two hundred years has been studied in detail. At the start of this period, the vast majority of peppered moths had light coloured wing patterns which effectively camouflaged them against the light-coloured trees and lichens upon which they rested. However, due to widespread pollution during the Industrial Revolution in England, many of the lichens died out, and the trees which peppered moths rested on became blackened by soot, causing most of the light-coloured moths, or typica, to die off due to predation. At the same time, the dark-coloured, or melanic, moths, carbonaria, flourished because they could hide on the darkened trees.

Since then, with improved environmental standards, light-coloured peppered moths have again become common, and the dramatic change in the peppered moth's population has remained a subject of much interest and study. This has led to the coining of the term "industrial melanism" to refer to the genetic darkening of species in response to pollutants. As a result of the relatively simple and easy-to-understand circumstances of the adaptation, the peppered moth has become a common example used in explaining or demonstrating natural selection to laypeople and classroom students through simulations.

The first carbonaria morph was recorded by Edleston in Manchester in 1848, and over the subsequent years it increased in frequency. Predation experiments, particularly by Bernard Kettlewell, established that the agent of selection was birds who preyed on the carbonaria morph. Subsequent experiments and observations have supported the initial evolutionary explanation of the phenomenon.

=== Genetic basis of melanism ===
The evolution of the industrial melanism mutation has been shown to be due to the insertion of a transposable element into the first intron of the cortex gene, resulting in an increase in the abundance of the cortex transcript, which is expressed in developing wings.

== Gallery ==
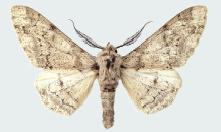
Subspecies parva (male)

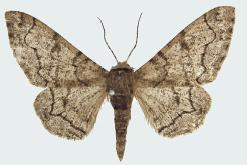
Subspecies parva (female)

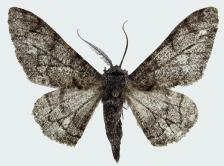
Subspecies Biston betularia nepalensis (male)

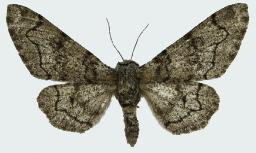
Subspecies nepalensis (female)
