= Flora of Brisbane =

The greater Brisbane area of Queensland Australia, has many species of indigenous flora. This article links the flora to its geography with:

- a list of indigenous genera and species with common names and reference links
- a list of places you might see the plants around Brisbane, in parks and in the wild
- reference resources

== Plants ==
The list is organised in alphabetic order by genera; then species scientific name and common names; then external links documenting that species.

=== A ===
- Acacia, wattles
  - Acacia fimbriata, Brisbane golden wattle
  - Acacia leiocalyx, black wattle
- Acmena, lillypilly
  - Acmena smithii, lillypilly
- Acronychia, aspens
  - Acronychia laevis, glossy acronychia
  - Acronychia pauciflora, soft acronychia
- Adiantum
  - Adiantum aethiopicum, common maidenhair fern
  - Adiantum hispidulum, rough maidenhair fern
- Ailanthus
  - Ailanthus triphysa, white bean
- Alchornea
  - Alchornea ilicifolia, native holly
- Alectryon
  - Alectryon tomentosus, hairy alectryon
- Alocasia
  - Alocasia brisbanensis, cunjevoi
- Alphitonia
  - Alphitonia excelsa, red ash
- Alpinia
  - Alpinia caerulea, native ginger
- Alyxia
  - Alyxia ruscifolia, chain fruit
- Angophora, apples, gums
  - Angophora subvelutina, broadleaf apple
  - Angophora leiocarpa, rusty gum
- Aphananthe
  - Aphananthe philippinensis, axe handle wood
- Allocasuarina, forest she-oaks
  - Allocasuarina torulosa, forest she-oak
- Araucaria, conifers, pines
  - Araucaria bidwillii, bunya pine
  - Araucaria cunninghamii, Moreton Bay pine, hoop pine
- Argyrodendron
  - Argyrodendron trifoliolatum, white booyong
- Aristolochia
  - Aristolochia praevenosa, Richmond birdwing butterfly vine
- Arytera
  - Arytera divaricata, coogera
- Asplenium
  - Asplenium australasicum, birdsnest fern
- Austromyrtus
  - Austromyrtus bidwillii, python tree
  - Austromyrtus hillii, scaly myrtle
  - Austromyrtus acmenoides, scrub ironwood
- Austrosteenisia
  - Austrosteenisia blackii, blood vine

=== B ===
- Baloghia
  - Baloghia inophylla, scrub bloodwood
- Banksia
  - Banksia integrifolia, coastal banksia
- Brachychiton, kurrajong, bottletree
  - Brachychiton discolor, lacebark
  - Brachychiton populneus, kurrajong.
    - See http://www.anbg.gov.au/gnp/interns-2002/brachychiton-populneus.html
- Bridelia
  - Bridelia exaltata, brush ironbark
  - Bridelia leichhardtii, small-leaved brush ironbark

=== C ===
- Callistemon, bottlebrush
  - Callistemon salignus, white bottlebrush
  - Callistemon viminalis, weeping bottlebrush
- Capparis
  - Capparis arborea, brush caper berry
- Carissa
  - Carissa ovata, current bush
    - See https://web.archive.org/web/20060822095802/http://www.brisrain.webcentral.com.au/old_site/database/Cari_ovata.htm
- Cassine
  - Cassine australis, red olive plum
- Castanospermum
  - Castanospermum australe, black bean
- Casuarina, she-oaks
  - Casuarina cunninghamiana, river she-oak
- Cissus
  - Cissus antarctica, water vine
  - Cissus opaca, small-leaf water vine
- Citriobatus
  - Citriobatus pauciflorus, orange thorn
  - Citriobatus linearis, bird's nest bush
- Citrus
  - Citrus australasica previously Microcitrus australasica, finger lime
    - See https://web.archive.org/web/20070720000320/http://www.brisrain.webcentral.com.au/01_cms/details_pop.asp?ID=565
  - Citrus australis previously Microcitrus australis, native lime
    - See https://web.archive.org/web/20060819084722/http://www.brisrain.webcentral.com.au/01_cms/details_pop.asp?ID=72
- Clerodendrum
  - Clerodendrum floribundum, lollybush
- Commersonia
  - Commersonia bartramia, brown kurrajong
- Corchorus
  - Corchorus cunninghamii, native jute
- Cordyline
  - Cordyline petiolaris, broad-leaved palm lily
  - Cordyline rubra, red-fruited palm lily
- Crinum
  - Crinum pedunculatum, river lily
- Cryptocarya
  - Cryptocarya obovata, pepperberry tree
- Corymbia, bloodwoods, ghost gums, spotted gums
  - Corymbia citriodora, lemon scented gum, spotted gum (Eucalyptus citriodora)
    - See http://www.saveourwaterwaysnow.com.au/01_cms/details_pop.asp?ID=135
    - See http://plantnet.rbgsyd.nsw.gov.au/cgi-bin/euctax.pl?/PlantNet/Euc=&name=Corymbia+citriodora
  - Corymbia henryi, spotted gum, large-leaved spotted gum (Eucalyptus henryi)
    - See http://saveourwaterwaysnow.com.au/01_cms/details_pop.asp?ID=137
  - Corymbia maculata, spotted gum (Eucalyptus maculata)
    - See https://web.archive.org/web/20080508223327/http://asgap.org.au/c-mac.html
    - See https://web.archive.org/web/20060517044451/http://www.anu.edu.au/BoZo/KioloaEcyclopaedia/viridiplantae/Spotted%20Gum.htm
  - Corymbia tessellaris, Moreton Bay ash, carbeen (syn. Eucalyptus tessellaris)
    - See http://www.saveourwaterwaysnow.com.au/01_cms/details_pop.asp?ID=138
- Cupaniopsis
  - Cupaniopsis anacardioides, tuckeroo, large-leaved tuckeroo

=== D ===
- Davallia
  - Davallia pyxidata, haresfoot fern
- Dendrobium, orchids
  - Dendrobium speciosum, king orchid
  - Dendrobium macropus
  - Dendrobium linguiforme, tongue orchid
  - Dendrobium monophyllum, lily of the valley orchid
  - Dendrobium teretifolium, bridal veil orchid
- Dendrocnide
  - Dendrocnide photiniphylla shiny-leaved stinging tree
    - See https://web.archive.org/web/20060822090445/http://www.brisrain.webcentral.com.au/old_site/database/Dendro_photinophylla.htm
- Denhamia
  - Denhamia pittosporoides, veiny denhamia
- Dianella
  - Dianella caerulea, blue flax lily, paroo lily
    - See https://web.archive.org/web/20060822075804/http://www.lhccrems.nsw.gov.au/CPR/CPR/plant_profiles/d.caerulea.htm
  - Dianella congesta, dwarf flax-lily
- Diploglottis
  - Diploglottis australis, native tamarind
    - https://web.archive.org/web/20060822092008/http://www.brisrain.webcentral.com.au/old_site/database/Diplo_australis.htm
- Doodia
  - Doodia aspera, prickly rasp fern
    - See https://web.archive.org/web/20060822104654/http://www.brisrain.webcentral.com.au/old_site/database/Doodia_aspera.htm
    - See http://www.saveourwaterwaysnow.com.au/01_cms/details_pop.asp?ID=154
- Drynaria
  - Drynaria rigidula, basket fern
- Dysoxylum
  - Dysoxylum rufum, hairy rosewood

=== E ===
- Ehretia
  - Ehretia acuminata, koda
    - See https://web.archive.org/web/20060822095556/http://www.brisrain.webcentral.com.au/old_site/database/Ehretia_acuminata.htm
- Elaeocarpus, quandong
  - Elaeocarpus obovatus, hard quandong
    - See https://web.archive.org/web/20060822080433/http://www.brisrain.webcentral.com.au/old_site/database/Elaeo_obovatus.htm
  - Elaeocarpus reticulatus, blueberry ash
    - See https://web.archive.org/web/20060822084117/http://www.brisrain.webcentral.com.au/old_site/database/Elaeo_reticulatus.htm
- Elattostachys
  - Elattostachys xylocarpa, white tamarind
- Erythina
  - Erythrina vespertilio, bat's wing coral tree
- Eucalyptus, gums, iron barks
  - Eucalyptus crebra, narrow-leaved ironbark
  - Eucalyptus henryi, broad-leaved spotted gum
  - Eucalyptus melanophloia, silver-leaved ironbark
  - Eucalyptus microcorys, tallowwood
  - Eucalyptus nigra, Queensland white stringybark
  - Eucalyptus propinqua, grey gum
    - See http://www.saveourwaterwaysnow.com.au/01_cms/details_pop.asp?ID=163
  - Eucalyptus siderophlia, grey ironbark
    - See http://www.saveourwaterwaysnow.com.au/01_cms/details_pop.asp?ID=164
  - Eucalyptus tereticornis, Queensland blue gum, forest red gum
    - See http://www.saveourwaterwaysnow.com.au/01_cms/details_pop.asp?ID=165
- Euroschinus
  - Euroschinus falcata, ribbonwood

=== F ===
- Ficus, figs
  - Ficus coronata, creek sandpaper fig
  - Ficus fraseri, shiny sandpaper fig
  - Ficus macrophylla, Moreton Bay fig
  - Ficus obliqua, small-leaved fig
  - Ficus opposita, sandpaper fig
  - Ficus platypoda, rock fig
  - Ficus virens var. sublanceolata, white fig
- Flindersia, ash
  - Flindersia australis, crow's ash
  - Flindersia bennettiana, Bennett's ash

=== G ===
- Glochidion
  - Glochidion ferdinandi, cheese tree
- Gmelina
  - Gmelina leichhardtii, white beech
- Grevillea
  - Grevillea robusta, silky oak
- Guioa
  - Guioa semiglauca
- Gymnostachys
  - Gymnostachys anceps, settlers flax

=== H ===
- Hakea
  - Hakea florulenta, blooming hakea
    - See
- Harpullia
  - Harpullia pendula, tulipwood
    - See https://web.archive.org/web/20060822084730/http://www.brisrain.webcentral.com.au/old_site/database/Harp_pendula.htm
  - Harpullia hillii, Hill's tulipwood
- Hibiscus
  - Hibiscus heterophyllus, native hibiscus
- Hovea
  - Hovea acutifolia, pointed-leaved hovea
- Hymenosporum
  - Hymenosporum flavum, native frangipani

=== J ===
- Jagera
  - Jagera pseudorhus, foambark
    - See https://web.archive.org/web/20060819081635/http://www.brisrain.webcentral.com.au/01_cms/details_pop.asp?ID=247
- Jasminum
  - Jasminum simplicifolium subsp. australiense
    - See https://web.archive.org/web/20060819090235/http://www.brisrain.webcentral.com.au/01_cms/details_pop.asp?ID=245

=== L ===
- Lobelia
  - Lobelia trigonocaulis, forest lobelia
- Lomandra
  - Lomandra longifolia, long-leaved matrush
  - Lomandra confertifolia
  - Lomandra hystrix
- Leptospermum, tea trees
- Lophostemon, boxes
  - Lophostemon confertus, brush box, Queensland box, Brisbane box
    - See https://web.archive.org/web/20060819082113/http://www.brisrain.webcentral.com.au/01_cms/details_pop.asp?ID=59

=== M ===
- Macaranga
  - Macaranga tanarius
- Macrozamia, burrawang
  - Macrozamia lucida, burrawang, pineapple zamia
  - Macrozamia miquellii
- Melaleuca, paperbarks
- Mallotus
  - Mallotus philippensis, red kamala
  - Mallotus claoxyloides, green kamala
  - Mallotus discolor, yellow kamala
- Melia
  - Melia azedarach var. australasica, white cedar, Chinaberry
- Melicope
  - Melicope micrococca, white euodia
- Microcitrus see citrus

=== N ===
- Notelaea
  - Notelaea longifolia, large mock-olive

=== O ===
- Omalanthus
  - Omalanthus populifolius, bleeding heart
- Oplismenus
  - Oplismenus aemulus, creeping beard grass
- Ottochloa
  - Ottochloa gracillima, graceful grass
- Owenia
  - Owenia venosa, crow's apple

=== P ===
- Pandorea
  - Pandorea floribunda
  - Pandorea jasminoides, bower-of-beauty
  - Pandorea pandorana, wonga vine
- Pararchidendron
  - Pararchidendron pruinosum, monkey's ear-rings
- Pavetta
  - Pavetta australiensis
- Pittosporum
  - Pittosporum rhombifolium, hollywood
  - Pittosporum revolutum, Brisbane laurel
- Planchonella
  - Planchonella cotinifolia, coondoo
  - Planchonella pohlmaniana, engraver's wood
  - Planchonella myrsinoides, yellow plumwood
- Platycerium
  - Platycerium bifurcatum, elkhorn
  - Platycerium superbum, staghorn
- Podocarpus, conifers, pines
  - Podocarpus elatus, brown pine
- Polyscias
  - Polyscias elegans, celerywood
- Premna
  - Premna lignumvitae
- Psychotria
  - Psychotria daphnoides, smooth psychotria
- Pteris
  - Pteridium esculentum, common bracken
  - Pteris tremula, tender bracken
- Pultenaea
  - Pultenaea cunninghamii, grey bush pea
  - Pultenaea villosa, hairy bush pea
- Pyrrosia
  - Pyrrosia confluens, felt fern

=== R ===
- Rhodosphaera
  - Rhodosphaera rhodanthema, deep yellowwood

=== S ===
- Smilax
  - Smilax australis, barbed wire vine
- Stenocarpus
  - Stenocarpus sinuatus, firewheel tree
- Stephania
  - Stephania philippensis, snake vine
- Sterculia
  - Sterculia quadrifida, peanut tree
- Streblus
  - Streblus brunonianus, whalebone tree
- Syzygium
  - Syzygium australe, creek lilly pilly

=== T ===
- Tabernaemontana
  - Tabernaemontana pandacaqui, banana bush (Ervatamia angustissepala)
- Toechima
  - Toechima tenax, pitted-leaf steelwood
- Toona
  - Toona australis, red cedar
- Trema
  - Trema aspera, poison peach
- Tristaniopsis
  - Tristaniopsis laurina, watergum
- Turraea
  - Turraea pubescens

=== W ===
- Waterhousea
  - Waterhousea floribunda, weeping lilly pilly (Syzygium floribundum)
- Wilkiea
  - Wilkiea macrophylla, large-leaved wilkiea

== Places ==
Parklands, forests and reserves with native vegetation around Brisbane.

=== Metropolitan area ===
- Anstead Bushland Reserve
- Banks Street Reserve
- Bayside Parklands
- Belmont Hills Bushland
- Boondall Wetlands
- Bunyaville State Forest Park
  - See https://web.archive.org/web/20070917020029/http://www.epa.qld.gov.au/projects/park/index.cgi?parkid=33
- Brisbane Botanic Gardens, Mount Coot-tha
- Brisbane Forest Park, Queensland
- Brisbane Koala Bushlands
- Bulimba Creek
- City Botanic Gardens
- Chermside Hills Reserves
- Deagon Wetlands
- Hemmant Quarry Reserve
- Indooroopilly Island Conservation Park
- Karawatha Forest
- Mt Coot-tha Forest
- Rafting Ground Reserve
  - See https://web.archive.org/web/20060822111124/http://www.brisrain.webcentral.com.au/old_site/newsletters/issue5/projects-rrr.html
- Raven Street Reserve
- Roma Street Parkland
- Samford State Forest Park
- Seven Hills Bushland Reserve
- Tinchi Tamba Wetlands
- Toohey Mountain / Toohey Forest
- Whites Hill Reserve
- Venman Bushland National Park

=== Within 100 km ===
- Bellthorpe State Forest
- Bribie Island
- Burleigh Head National Park
- Glasshouse Mountains
- Moreton Island National Park
- Mt Mee State Forest
- Nerang State Forest
- North Stradbroke Island
- Numinbah State Forest
- Tamborine Mountain
- White Rock Conservation Park

== See also ==
- Association of Societies for Growing Australian Plants
- Flora of Australia
- Invasive species in Australia#Invasive plant species
- List of endangered Australian plants
- Protected areas of Queensland
