= Allan Black =

Allan Adamson Black (1832 − 4 December 1865) was a botanist who served as the first curator at Kew. The plant genus Allanblackia was named after him posthumously by Professor Daniel Oliver. The species Austrosteenisia blackii is also named after him.

Black was the fourth son of Reverend John Black of Perthshire, Scotland. In 1853, Black became the first curator of the Herbarium Hookerianum at the Royal Botanic Gardens, Kew, where he served until 1863–64. He left Kew due to tuberculosis (then called "consumption") and it was thought that a tropical climate would help him and was posted Superintendent to the Lalbagh Botanical gardens. In 1864 he published Report of the Mysore Government Garden at Bangalore for 1863-64. He died on a journey from Rangoon to the Andamans while aboard HMS Dalhousie off the Cocos Islands on 4 December 1865. He was buried on Table Island, Cocos group.
