= W. floribunda =

W. floribunda may refer to:

- Waterhousea floribunda, an eastern Australian tree
- Wisteria floribunda, a pea native to Japan
- Woodfordia floribunda, a plant endemic to India
