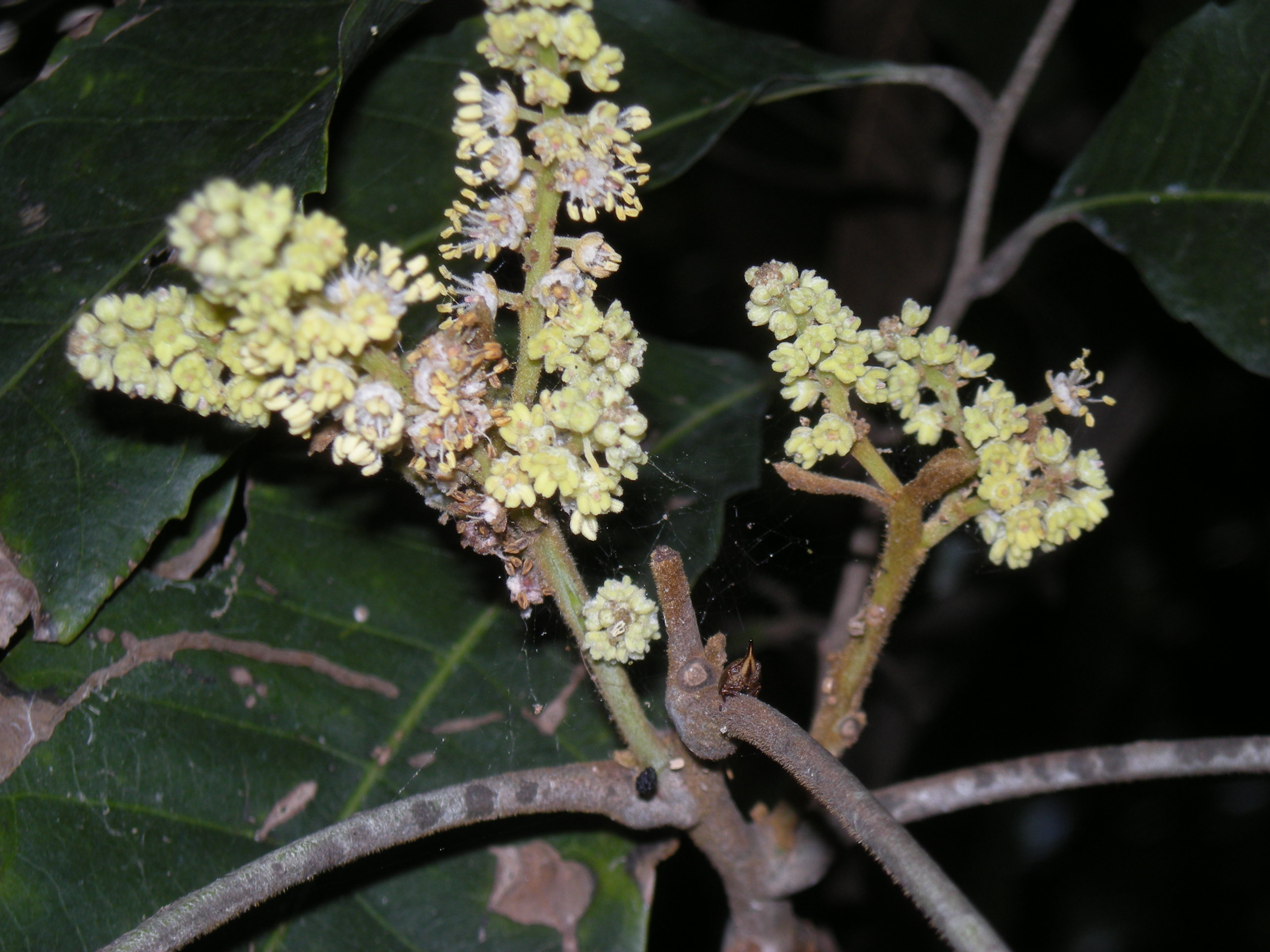
- Flowering

Scientific classification
- Kingdom: Plantae
- Clade: Tracheophytes
- Clade: Angiosperms
- Clade: Eudicots
- Clade: Rosids
- Order: Sapindales
- Family: Sapindaceae
- Genus: Elattostachys
- Species: E. microcarpa

Binomial name
- Elattostachys microcarpa S.T.Reynolds

= Elattostachys microcarpa =

Scrub tamarind

Species of tree

Elattostachys microcarpa, commonly named scrub tamarind, is a species of rainforest trees of north-eastern Australia. They grow naturally in the relatively seasonal rainforests, which may have a drought season and often in association with kauri pine.

The name Elattostachys refers to "little spikes", a flower feature of other plants in this genus. The specific name microcarpa refers to the small woody seeds.

== Description ==
A tree up to 15 metres (50 ft) tall, with a stem diameter of up to 30 cm (12 in). Leaves pinnate and arranged alternately on the stem. Leaflet blades approximately 100×30 mm (3.9×1.2 in). Young shoots and terminal buds covered with short pale hairs.

Cream flowers form on panicle, followed by round pink or red fruit which split to reveal black glossy seeds

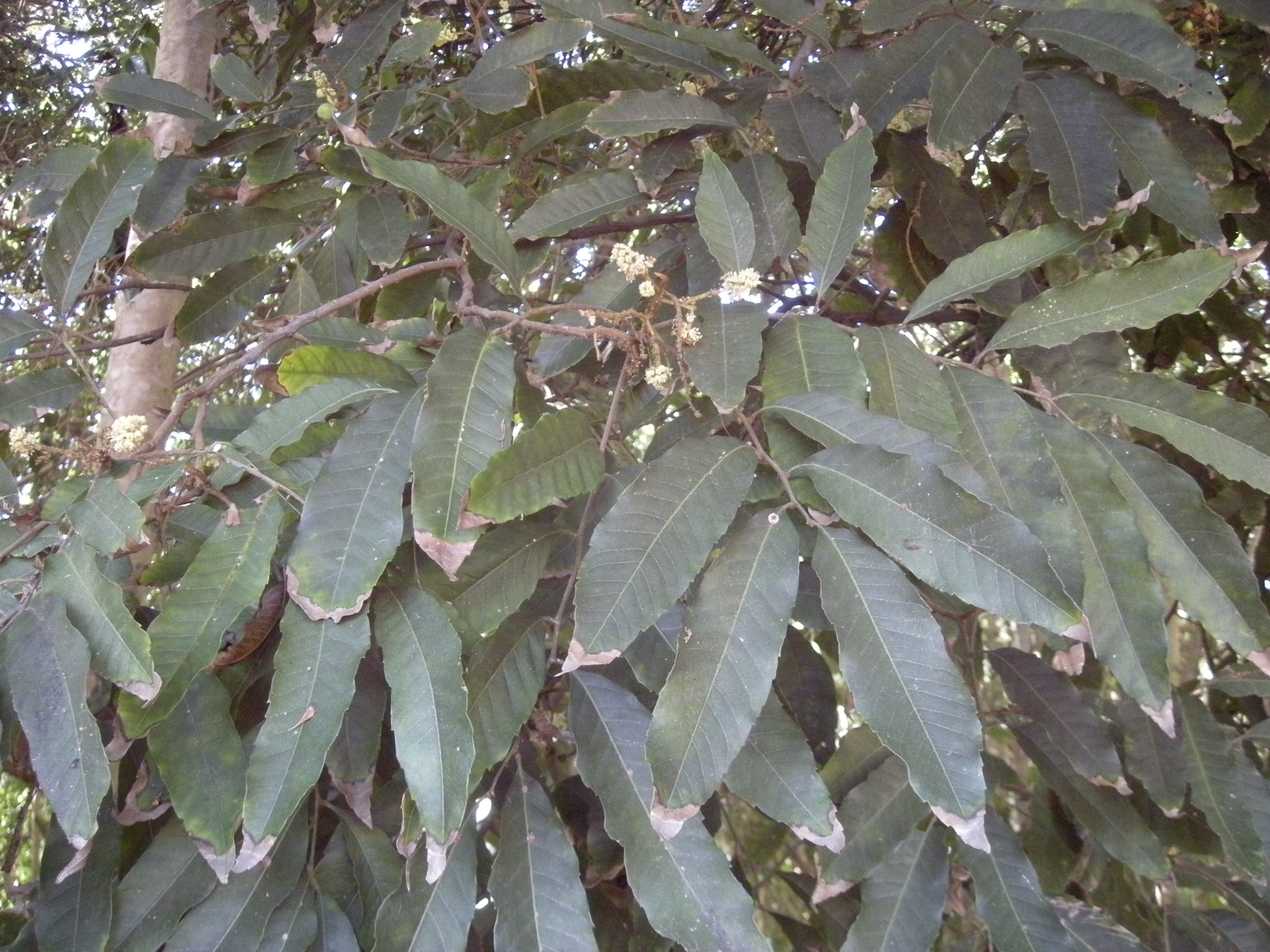
Foliage with a few flowers

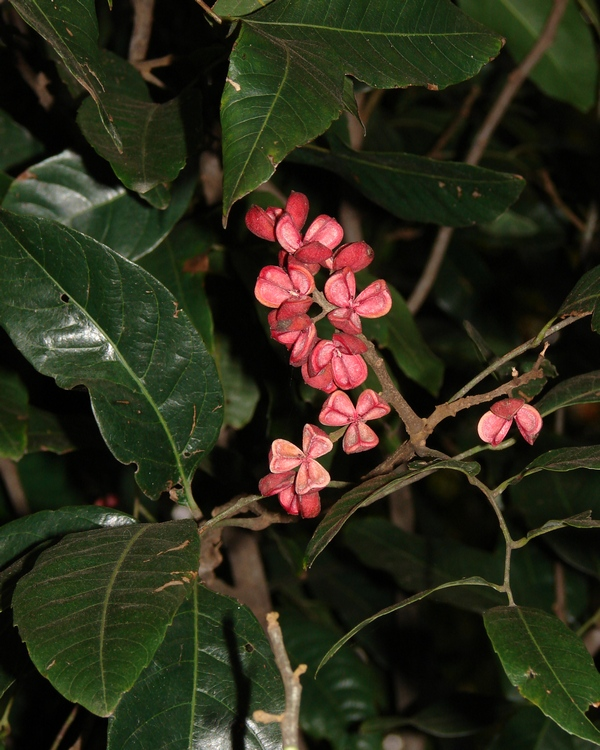
Foliage and fruiting capsules open, empty (cultivated tree)
