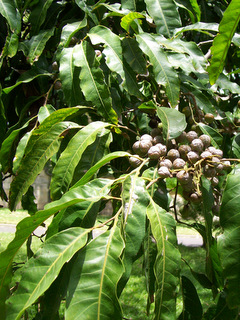

Scientific classification
- Kingdom: Plantae
- Clade: Tracheophytes
- Clade: Angiosperms
- Clade: Eudicots
- Clade: Rosids
- Order: Sapindales
- Family: Sapindaceae
- Genus: Elattostachys
- Species: E. nervosa

Binomial name
- Elattostachys nervosa (F.Muell.) Radlk.

Synonyms
- * Cupania nervosa F.Muell.

= Elattostachys nervosa =

Beetroot tree

Species of tree

Elattostachys nervosa, known as the green tamarind or beetroot tree is a common rainforest tree of eastern Australia. Found in all types of rainforest, growing from Paterson, New South Wales (32° S) in the south to Gympie (27° S) in south east Queensland. The name Elattostachys refers to "little spikes", a flower feature of other plants in this genus. Nervosa refers to the prominent leaf venation. Beetroot Tree refers to the beetroot red leaves of the new growth.

== Description ==
A medium-sized tree, up to 30 metres tall and a stem diameter of 50 cm. Usually seen much smaller. The trunk is flanged or buttressed in larger trees. Relatively smooth bark, paper thin, grey. Though with vertical lines and stripes in certain broader tree trunks. Small branches thick, greyish brown with rusty hairs towards the end. Shoots with dense woolly hairs.

=== Leaves ===
Leaves pinnate and alternate on the stem. Leaflet stalks 5 to 12 mm long. Leaflets 8 to 16 cm long, 2 to 4 cm wide. Though new growth can see leaflets red in colour and 28 cm long. Leaflets sometimes notched, other times entire. Leaflets sickle-shaped or lanceolate, with a fine or blunt tip. Leaf veins are evident on both sides of the leaf, net veins better seen under the leaf. Lateral veins 15 to 25 in number, raised on both sides.

=== Flowers ===
Flowers with very small yellow/brown petals form on racemes in the months of March to May. Occasionally flowering between September and November.

=== Fruit and regeneration ===
The fruit is a reddish pink woody capsule with three cells. Warty and uneven in appearance, 12 to 18 mm in diameter. Inside the cell is a pink interior, with a black or dark brown glossy seed. Around the seed is red aril, making the fruit attractive to birds. Fruit are often seedless, showing an unusual parthenocarpic formation. Regeneration from fresh seed is swift, with around half of the seeds germinating in the first two weeks.
