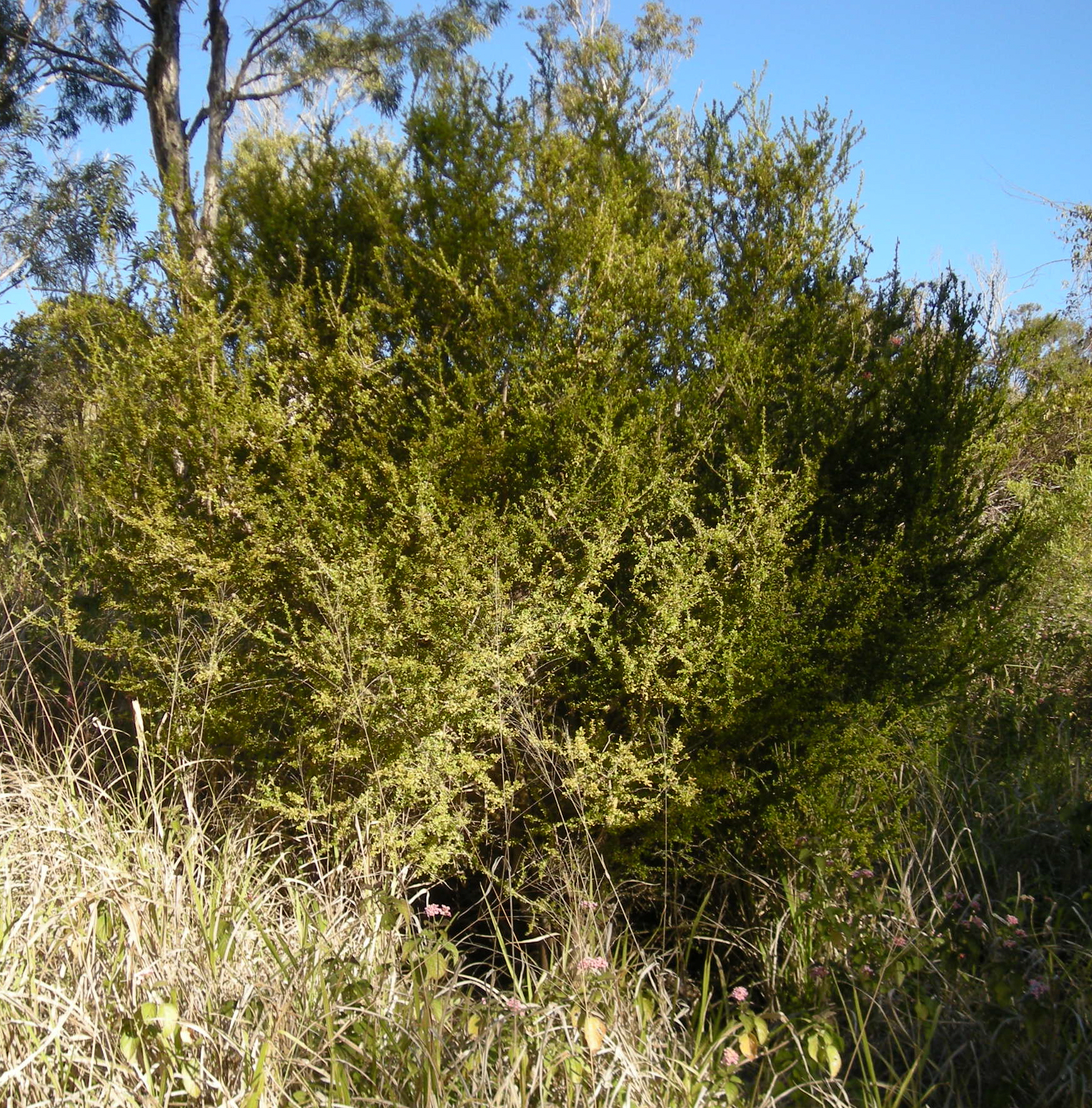

Scientific classification
- Kingdom: Plantae
- Clade: Tracheophytes
- Clade: Angiosperms
- Clade: Eudicots
- Clade: Asterids
- Order: Apiales
- Family: Pittosporaceae
- Genus: Pittosporum
- Species: P. spinescens

Binomial name
- Pittosporum spinescens (F.Muell.) L.W.Cayzer, Crisp & I.Telford

Synonyms
- Citriobatus spinescens; Citriobatus multiflorus; Citriobatus pauciflorus

= Pittosporum spinescens =

Species of tree

Pittosporum spinescens is a shrub native to woodlands and dry rainforest of Northern and Eastern Australia and New Guinea. Growing to 7m tall with small leaves clustered on short branches that often terminate in a sharp point. The plant produced edible fruits, 2–3 cm in diameter. It is commonly known as wallaby apple, orange thorn or thorn orange. P. spinescens is very similar in appearance to the closely related Pittosporum multiflorum, but is readily distinguished by its entire leaf margins, in contrast to the toothed leaf margins of the latter.

== Images ==
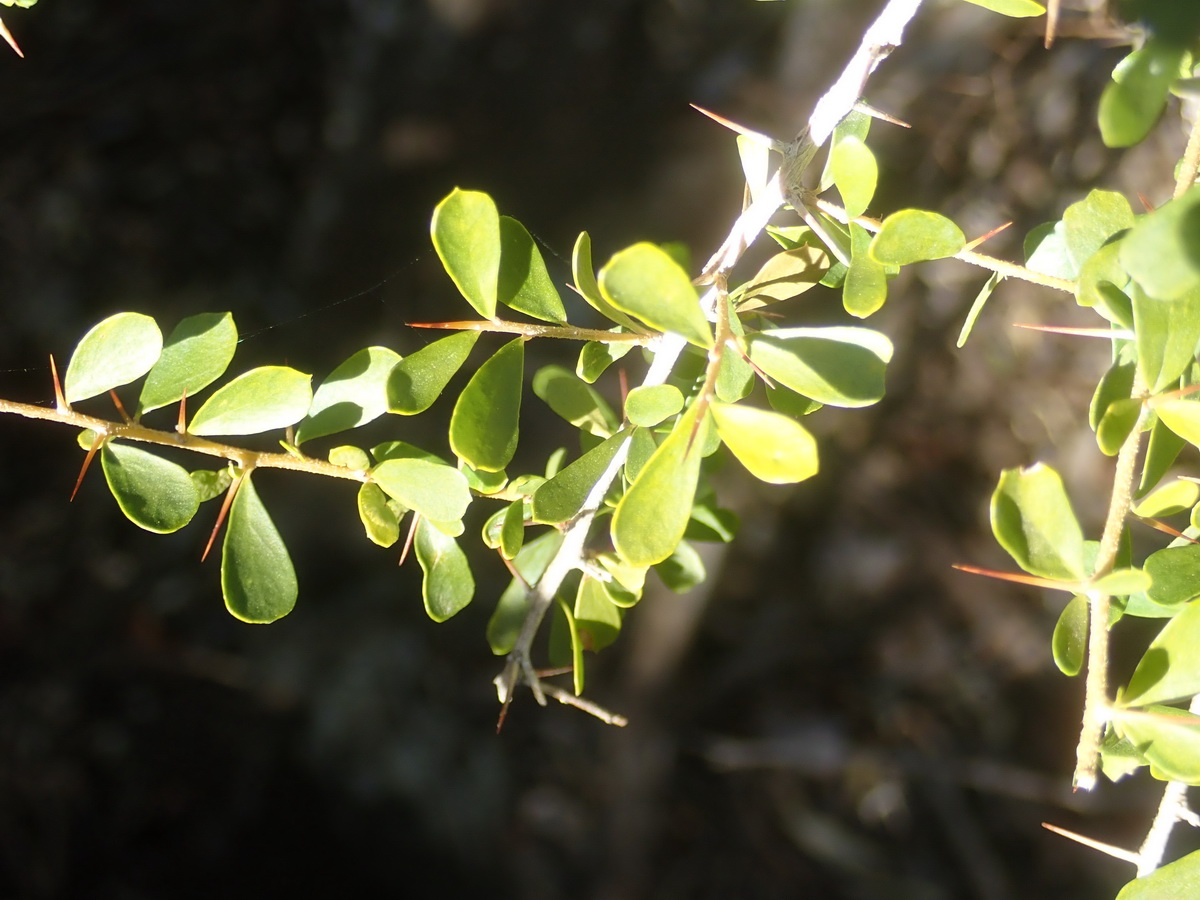
Pittosporum spinescens: the smaller branches terminating in sharp points.

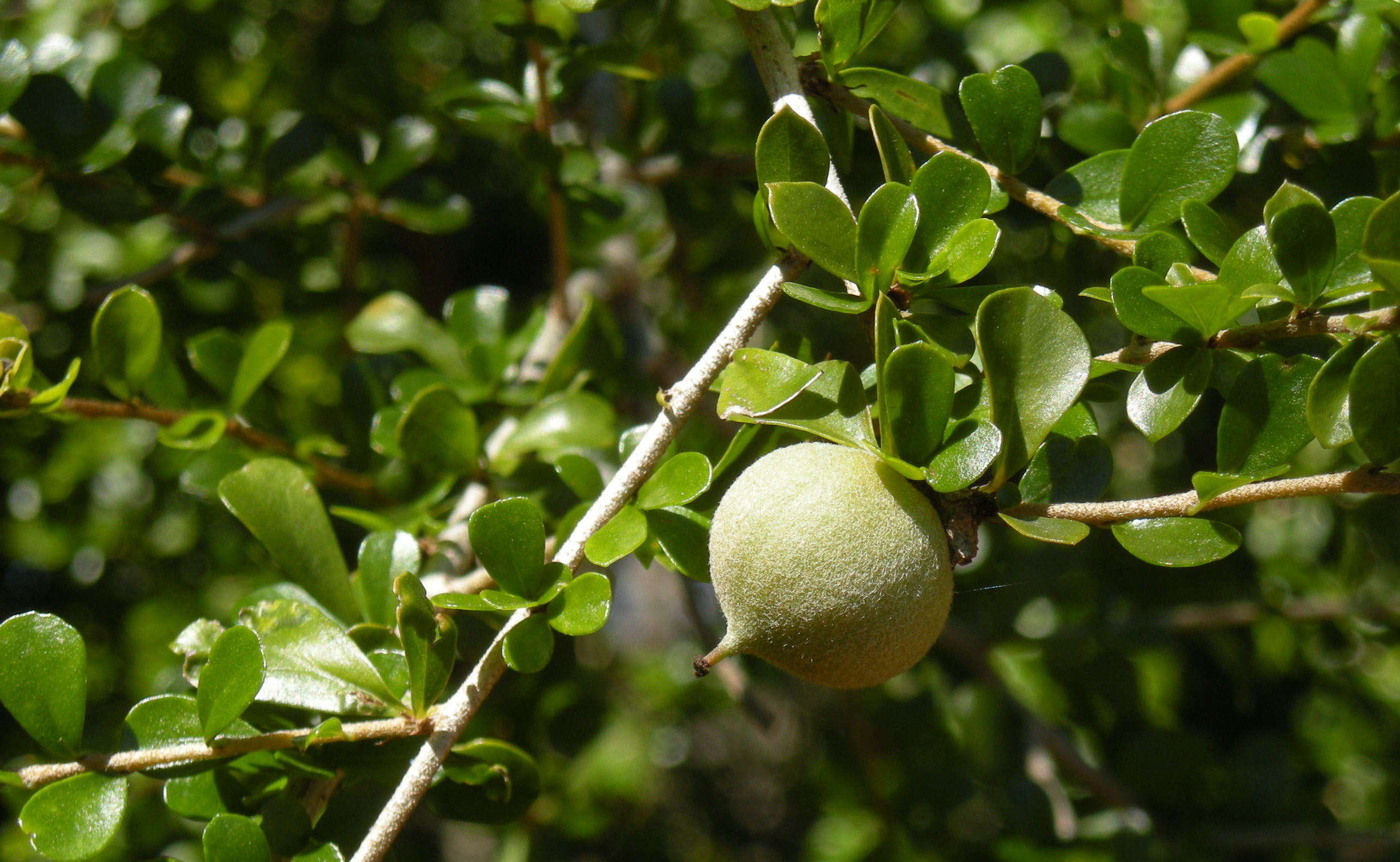
Pittosporum spinescens unripe fruit.

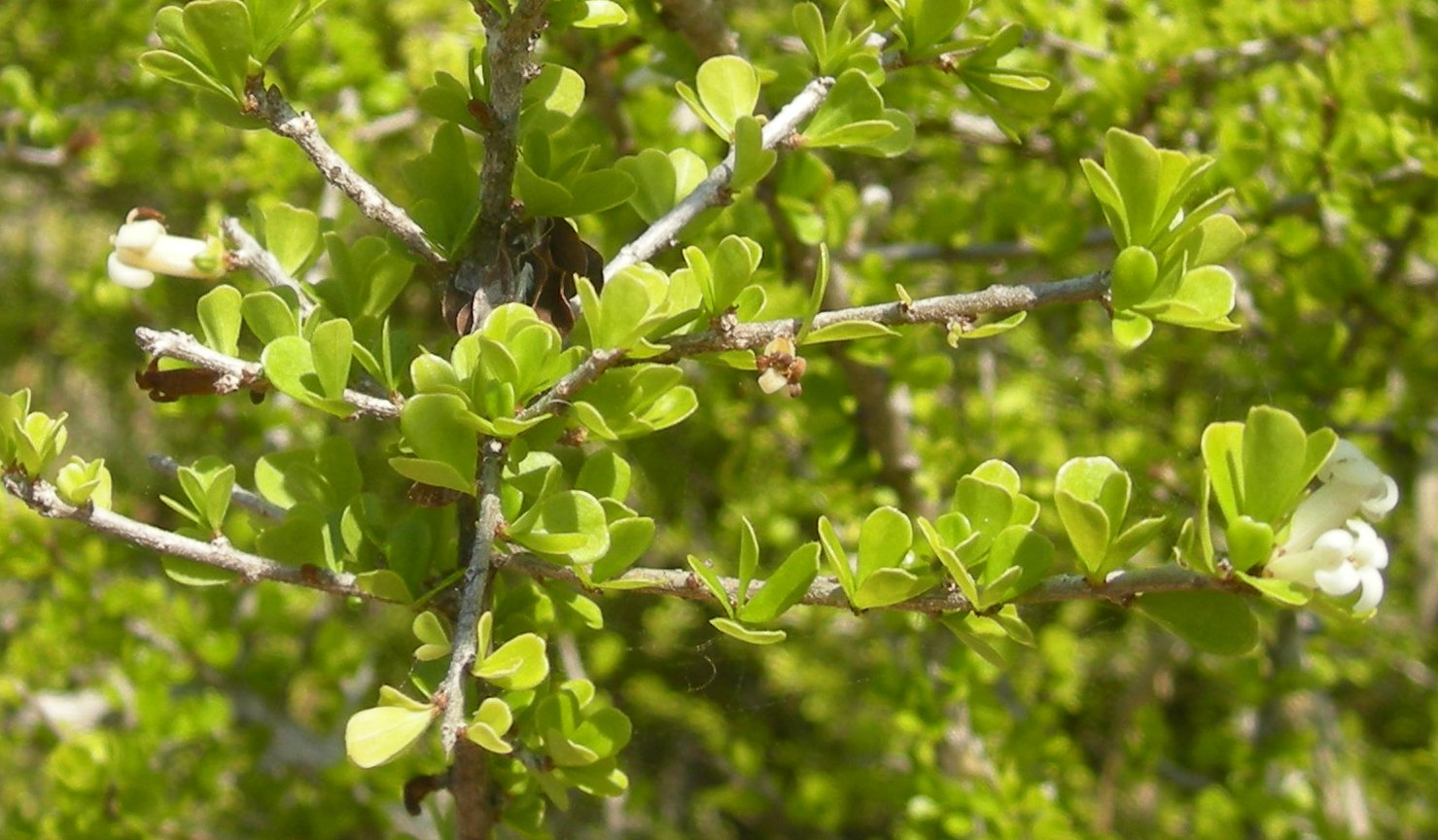
Pittosporum spinescens flowers.
