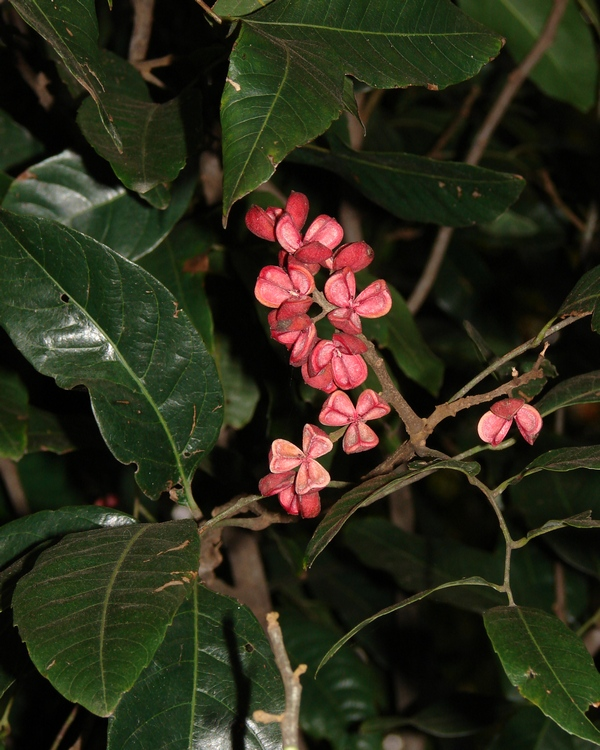
- Elattostachys microcarpa foliage and fruiting capsules, open, seeds gone

Scientific classification
- Kingdom: Plantae
- Clade: Embryophytes
- Clade: Tracheophytes
- Clade: Angiosperms
- Clade: Eudicots
- Clade: Rosids
- Order: Sapindales
- Family: Sapindaceae
- Tribe: Cupanieae
- Genus: Elattostachys (Blume) Radlk.

Species
- See text

= Elattostachys =

Genus of flowering plants

Elattostachys is a genus of about 21 species of trees known to science, constituting part of the plant family Sapindaceae.

They grow naturally in the New Guinea, the Moluccas, Sulawesi, Indonesia, Timor, Australia, New Caledonia, Vanuatu, Fiji, Samoa, Niue, Tonga, Palau (Caroline Islands) and the Philippines.

The known centre of diversity of New Guinea has nine known species recognised by science as of 2013.

In Australia, they grow naturally through the northern half of the eastern coastal zone, northwards from the Newcastle region in New South Wales through eastern Queensland to the northernmost point of Australia Cape York Peninsula. One of them E. xylocarpa has a common name of white tamarind, while another E. nervosa has a common name of beetroot tree. A few members of the Australian Sapindaceae are called tamarinds, although they have no close relation to the true tamarind, which is a member of the bean family.

== Conservation ==
At the global scale, several Elattostachys species have been threatened with extinction, as officially recognised by the International Union for Conservation of Nature (IUCN).

Three New Guinea endemic species E. aiyurensis, E. goropuensis and E. rubrofructus, one Sulawesi endemic species E. erythrocarpum and one New Caledonia endemic species E. dzumacensis have been vulnerable to global extinction according to the IUCN's 1998 assessment.

== Naming and classification ==
European science formally named and described this genus in 1879, authored by Bavarian botanist Ludwig A. T. Radlkofer, based on Carl Ludwig Blume's 1849 published Cupania sect. Elattostachys.

In 1992–3 Dutch botanist Frits Adema formally published new names and descriptions for numerous species and clarified species named previously, of the Pacific Islands and Malesia regions.

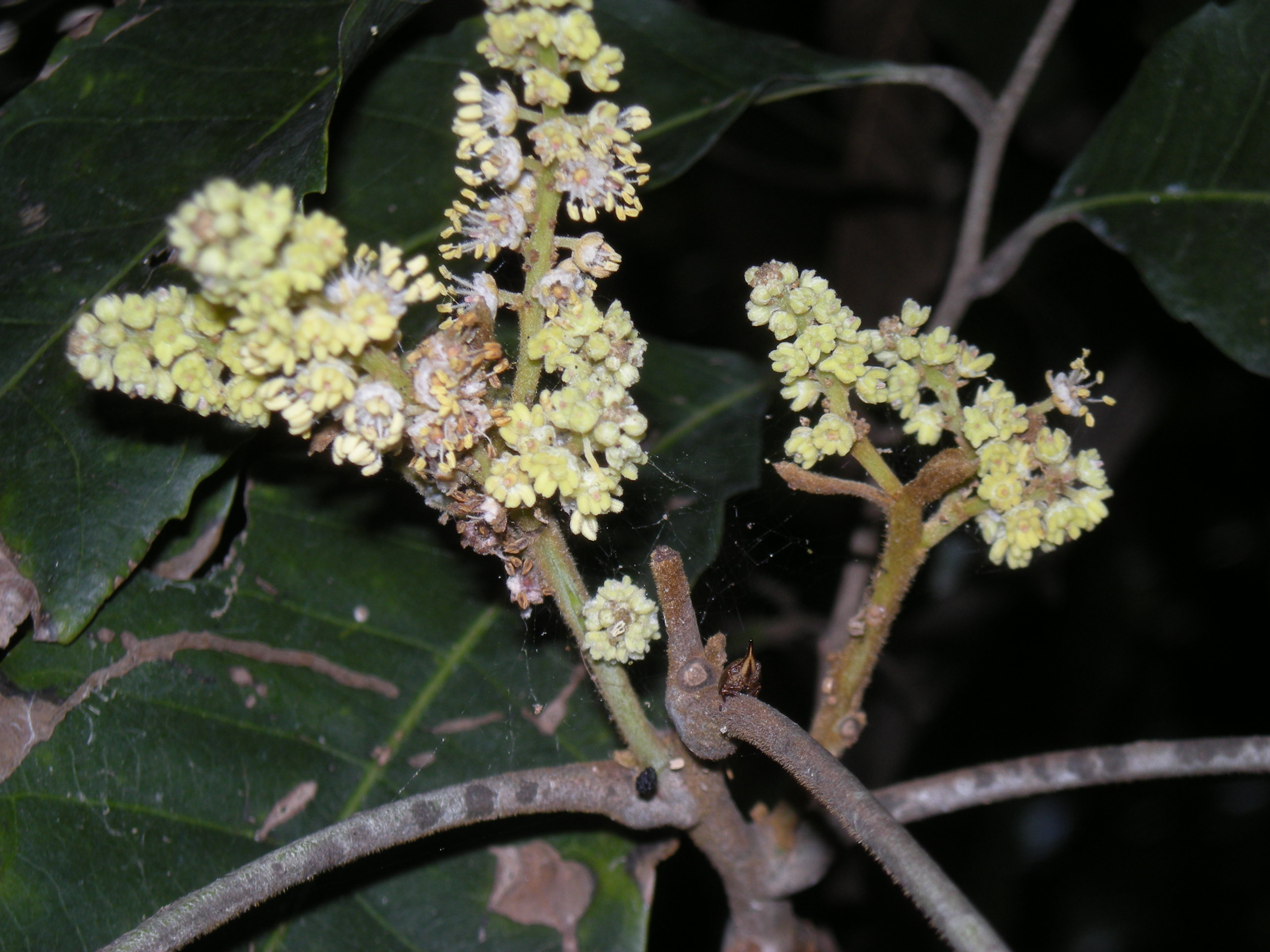
E. microcarpa flowering and foliage

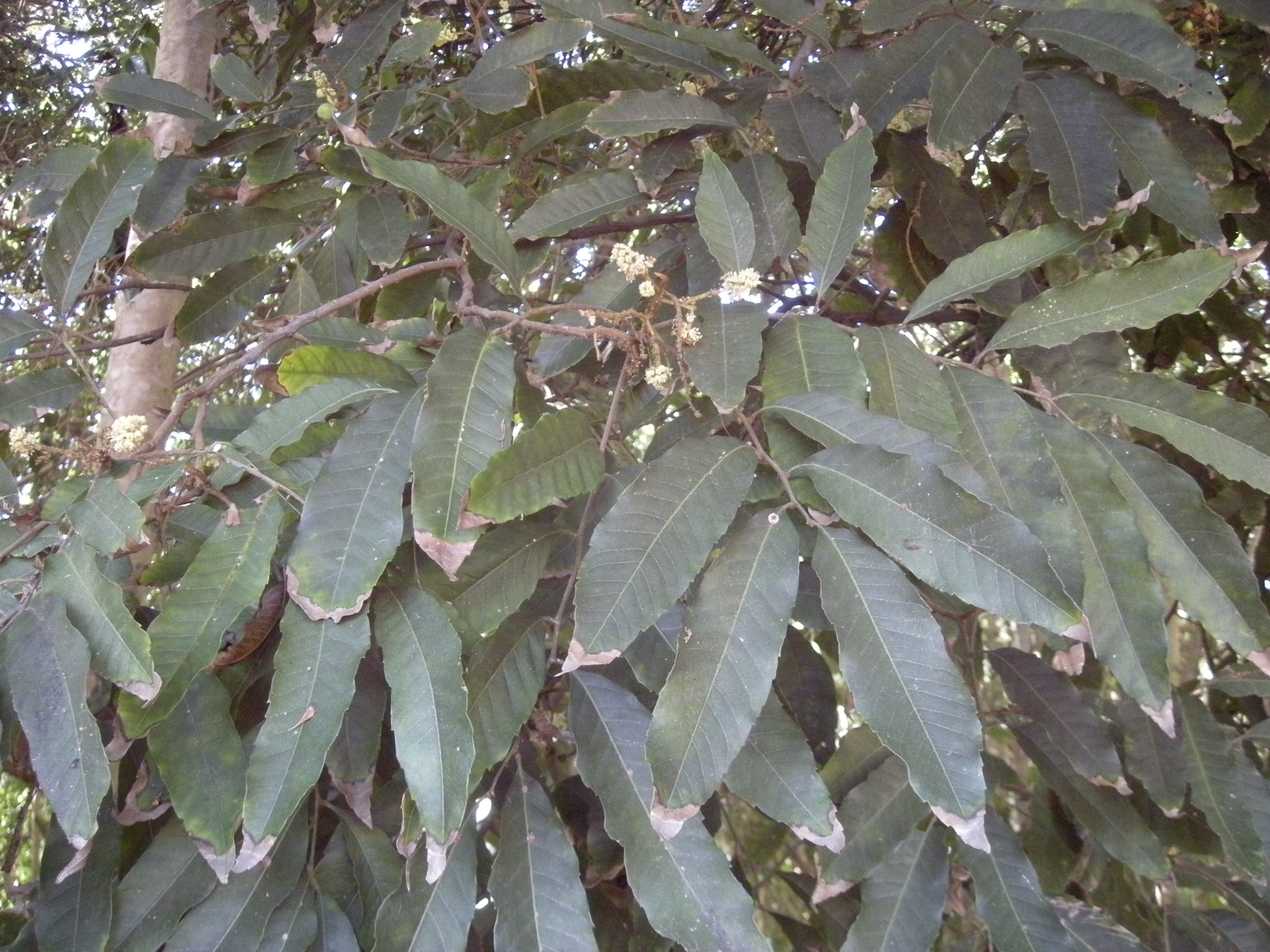
E. microcarpa foliage and flowers

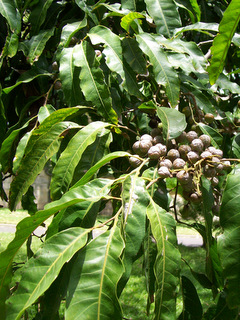
E. nervosa foliage and developing fruits

== Species ==
This listing was sourced from Flora Malesiana, the Census of Vascular Plants of Papua New Guinea, the Checklist of the vascular indigenous Flora of New Caledonia, peer reviewed published scientific species descriptions journal articles, the International Union for Conservation of Nature Redlist conservation status assessments, the Flora of Micronesia checklist, Flora Vitiensis (Fiji), the Australian Plant Name Index and Australian Plant Census, the Australian Tropical Rainforest Plants information system, Fruits of the Australian Tropical Rainforest, the Flora of New South Wales and the Flora of Australia.:

- Elattostachys aiyurensis Adema – New Guinea endemic – Vulnerable
- Elattostachys angulosa Adema – New Guinea endemic
- Elattostachys apetala (Labill.) Radlk., syn.: E. falcata (A.Gray) Radlk. – New Caledonia, Vanuatu, Fiji, Niue, Samoa, Tonga
- Elattostachys dzumacensis Adema – New Caledonia endemic – Vulnerable
- Elattostachys erythrocarpum Adema – Sulawesi endemic – Vulnerable
- Elattostachys globosa Adema – New Guinea endemic
- Elattostachys goropuensis Adema – New Guinea endemic – Vulnerable
- Elattostachys incisa Radlk. – New Caledonia endemic
- Elattostachys megalantha S.T.Reynolds – endemic to NE. Qld, Australia
- Elattostachys microcarpa S.T.Reynolds – endemic to NE. and Cape York Peninsula, Qld, Australia
- Elattostachys nervosa (F.Muell.) Radlk. – NE. NSW to SE. Qld, Australia, endemic
- Elattostachys obliquinervis Radlk. – New Guinea endemic
- Elattostachys palauensis Hosok. – Palau, Caroline Islands, endemic
- Elattostachys rubrofructus Adema – New Guinea endemic – Vulnerable
- Elattostachys solomonensis Adema – Solomon Is., New Guinea endemic
- Elattostachys tetraporandra Radlk. – New Guinea endemic
- Elattostachys venosa A.C.Sm. – Fiji endemic
- Elattostachys verrucosa (Blume) Radlk. – Java, Philippines, Sulawesi, Bali, Lombok, Sumbawa, Sumba, Flores, Wetar, Timor, Moluccas
- Elattostachys vitiensis Seemann ex Radlk. – Fiji endemic
- Elattostachys xylocarpa (A.Cunn. ex F.Muell.) Radlk. – NE. NSW northwards though E. Qld to Bowen, Australia, endemic
- Elattostachys zippeliana (Blume) Radlk. – Borneo, Sulawesi, Moluccas, New Guinea
