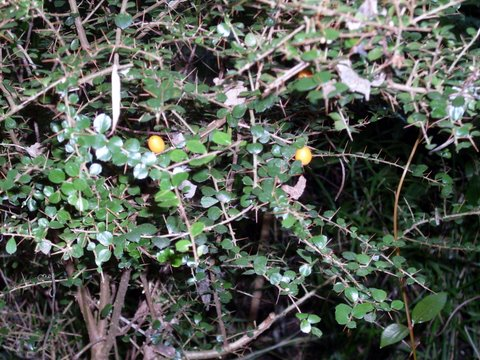
- Orange thorn at Eastwood, Australia

Scientific classification
- Kingdom: Plantae
- Clade: Tracheophytes
- Clade: Angiosperms
- Clade: Eudicots
- Clade: Asterids
- Order: Apiales
- Family: Pittosporaceae
- Genus: Pittosporum
- Species: P. multiflorum

Binomial name
- Pittosporum multiflorum (A.Cunn. ex Loudon) L.W.Cayzer, Crisp & I.Telford

Synonyms
- Citriobatus multiflorus A.Cunn. ex Loudon; Citriobatus pauciflorus A.Cunn. ex Ettingsh. sensu Makinson

= Pittosporum multiflorum =

Orange thorn

Species of shrub

Pittosporum multiflorum, known as the orange thorn, is a shrub growing in eastern Australia. The dense foliage provides a habitat for small birds and animals. It grows on shales or volcanic soils, from Eden, New South Wales north to Queensland, usually in or near rainforest areas.

== Description ==
Pittosporum multiflorum grows from one to three metres in height. Thickly branched with small spines. Leaves almost circular, 3 to 12 mm long, practically without leaf stalks. Mostly toothed, through rarely entire. Flowering occurs in spring or summer. The orange fruit often persists on the plant. Regeneration from fresh seed is slow but fairly reliable. The plant is very similar to the closely related Pittosporum spinescens, but is readily distinguished by its toothed leaf margins.

The 1889 book 'The Useful Native Plants of Australia records that common names included "Native Orange" and "Orange Thorn" and that "The fruit is an orange berry with a leathery skin, about one inch and a half in diameter. The seeds are large. It is eaten by the aboriginals [sic.]."

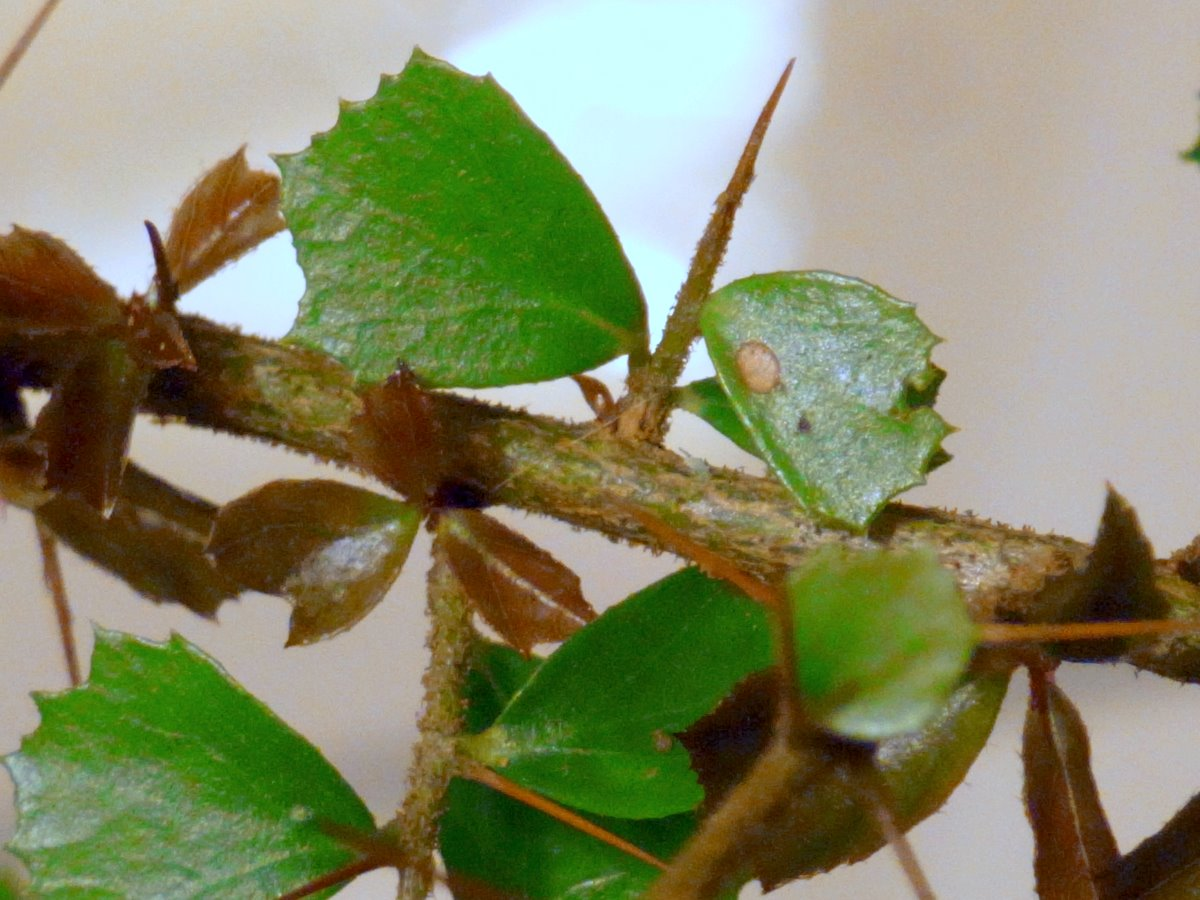
Orange Thorn, leaves and thorn

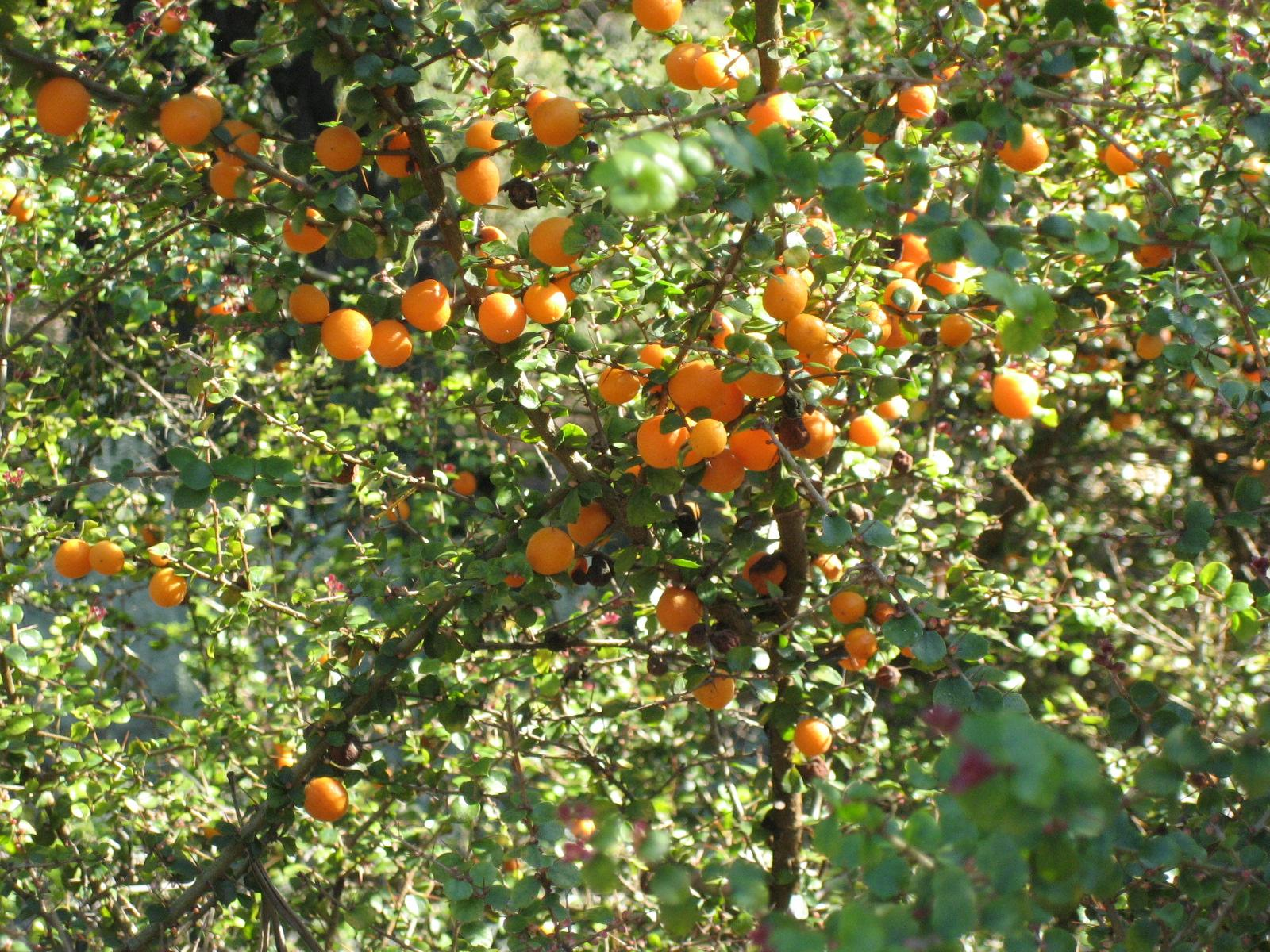
Orange Thorn, fruits

== Taxonomy ==
It was first described in 1832 as Citriobatus multiflorus by Allan Cunningham, and was transferred to the genus, Pittosporum, by Lindy Cayzer, Michael Crisp and Ian Telford in 2000.
