= Psychotria daphnoides =

- Campbelltown, New South Wales

Conservation status
- Least Concern (NCA)

Scientific classification
- Kingdom: Plantae
- Clade: Tracheophytes
- Clade: Angiosperms
- Clade: Eudicots
- Clade: Asterids
- Order: Gentianales
- Family: Rubiaceae
- Genus: Psychotria
- Species: P. daphnoides

Binomial name
- Psychotria daphnoides A.Cunn. ex Hook. 1833

Species of flowering plant

Psychotria daphnoides, known commonly as the smooth psychotria or turkey bush, is a species of shrub or small tree in the coffee family Rubiaceae that is native to New South Wales, Queensland and the Northern Territory in Australia.

== Habitat & distribution ==
The species is widespread with a continuous presence in rainforest and wet sclerophyll woodlands on the eastern seaboard from Newcastle to Cooktown. The species is also abundant in the Top End, with occurrences in or near Darwin, the Tiwi Islands, Kakadu National Park and Arnhem Land.

== Description ==
It can grow as a shrub or tree to a height of 5 metres. The species has a perennial life cycle and is hermaphroditic. The species has a prostrate growth habit. It reaches reproductive maturity at 4 to 5 years of age. The species flowers from December to April and fruits from February to July. The flowers are white cream in colour. The species features fleshy, indehiscent and drupaceous fruit. The species is evergreen. The leaves have entire margins with oblanceolate, oblong or obovate leaf shapes. The length of the leaves is 95 millimetres and the width of the leaves is 36 millimetres.

== Conservation ==
Under the Nature Conservation Act 1992 in Queensland it has been classified as Least Concern.
