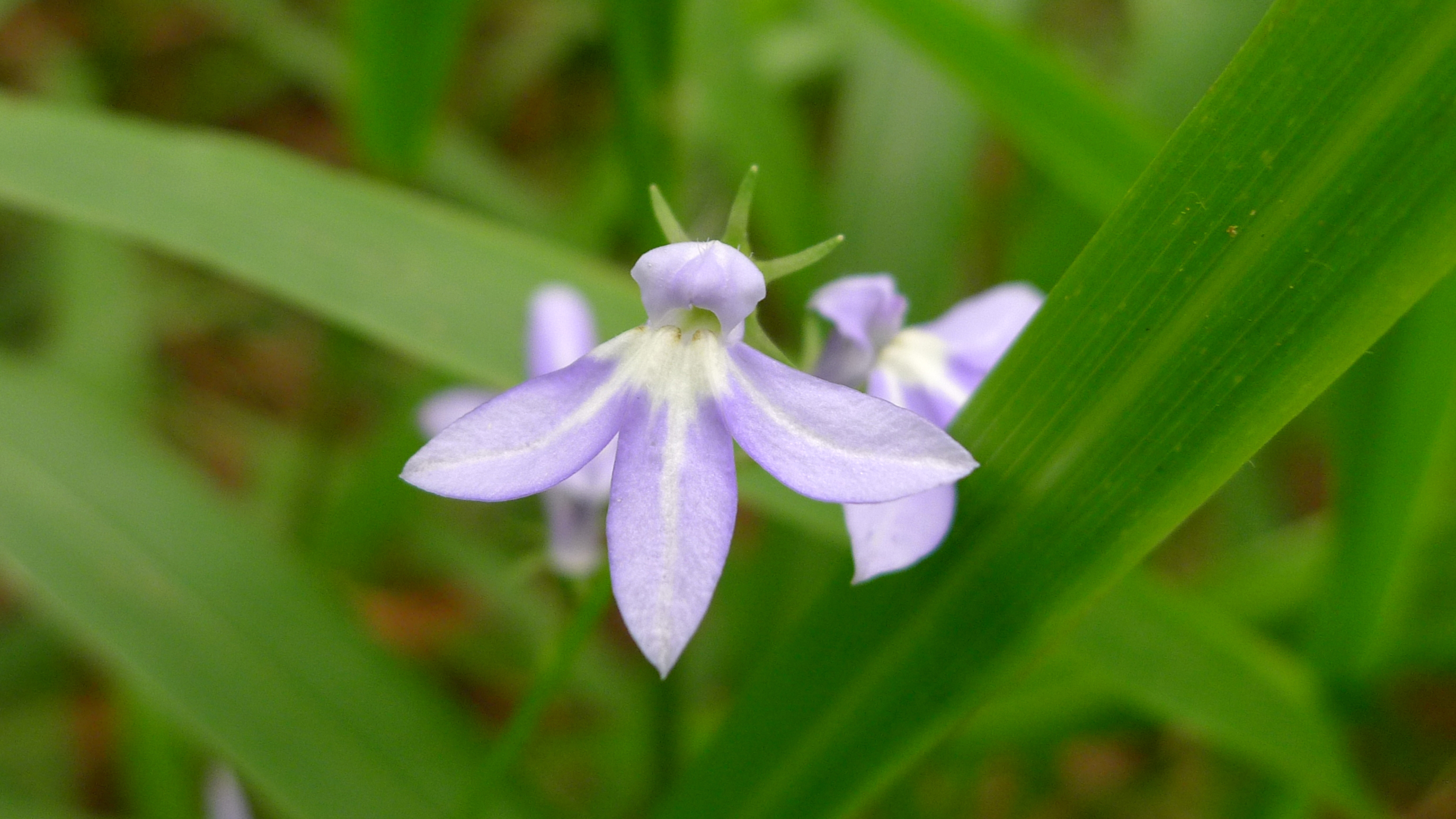

Conservation status
- Least Concern (NCA)

Scientific classification
- Kingdom: Plantae
- Clade: Embryophytes
- Clade: Tracheophytes
- Clade: Spermatophytes
- Clade: Angiosperms
- Clade: Eudicots
- Clade: Asterids
- Order: Asterales
- Family: Campanulaceae
- Genus: Lobelia
- Species: L. trigonocaulis

Binomial name
- Lobelia trigonocaulis F.Muell.

Synonyms
- Dortmanna trigonocaulis (F.Muell.) Kuntze; Lobelia leichhardii E.Wimm.

= Lobelia trigonocaulis =

Forest lobelia

Species of flowering plant

Lobelia trigonocaulis, the forest lobelia is a creeping or trailing herb, found in moist forest areas in New South Wales and Queensland in Australia. Blue to mauve flowers form between the months of December and May. Leaves are near circular or ovate in shape; ranging from about 4.0 to 5.5 cm (1.6 to 2.2 in) long and 2.5 to 3.8 cm (0.98 to 1.50 in) wide.
