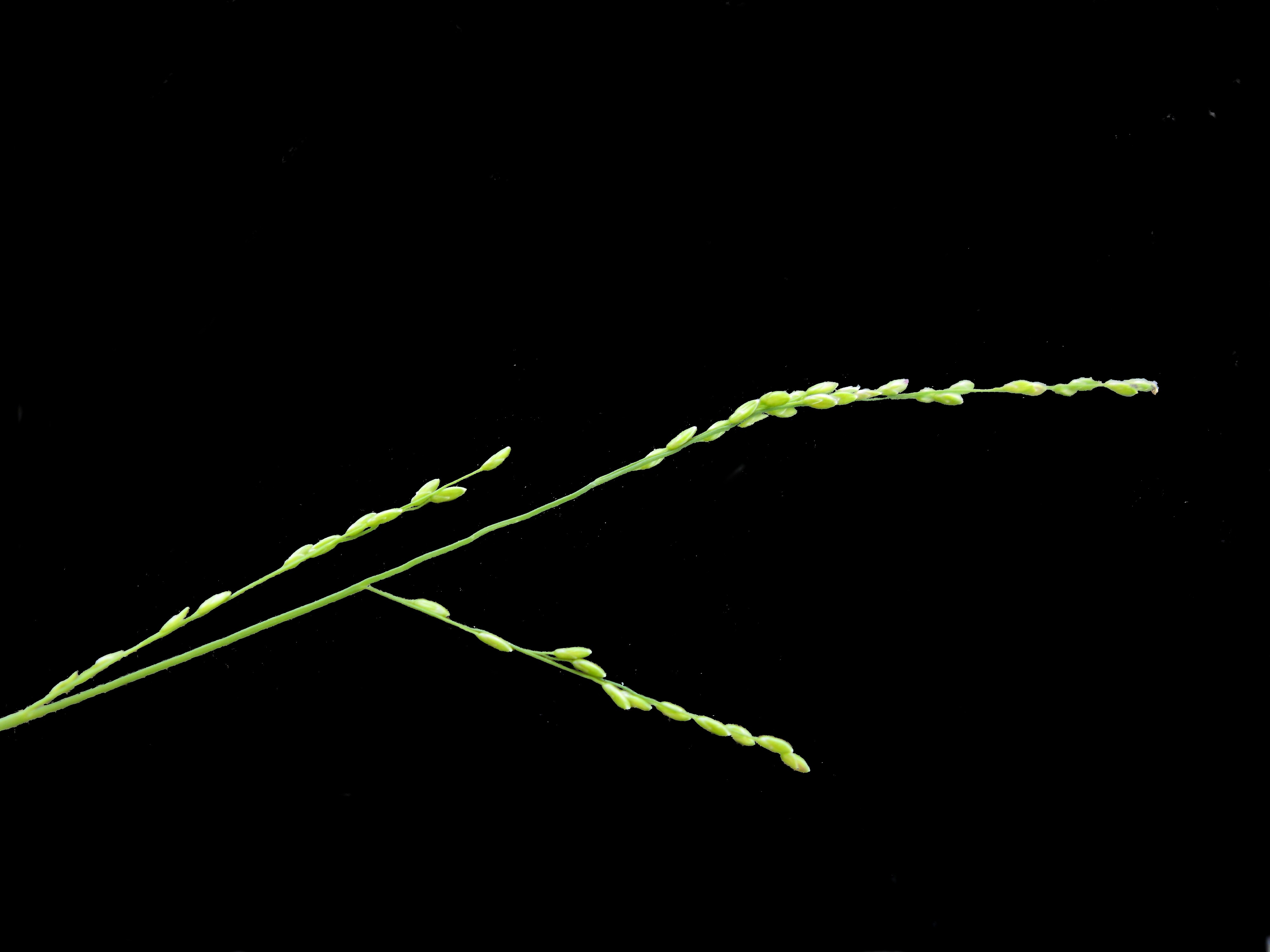
- Tucabia, New South Wales

Scientific classification
- Kingdom: Plantae
- Clade: Tracheophytes
- Clade: Angiosperms
- Clade: Monocots
- Clade: Commelinids
- Order: Poales
- Family: Poaceae
- Subfamily: Panicoideae
- Genus: Ottochloa
- Species: O. gracillima

Binomial name
- Ottochloa gracillima C.E.Hubb.

= Ottochloa gracillima =

Pademelon grass

Species of grass

Ottochloa gracillima, pademelon grass, is a species of grass, found in coastal eastern Australia. The habitat is shady areas, often near water.
