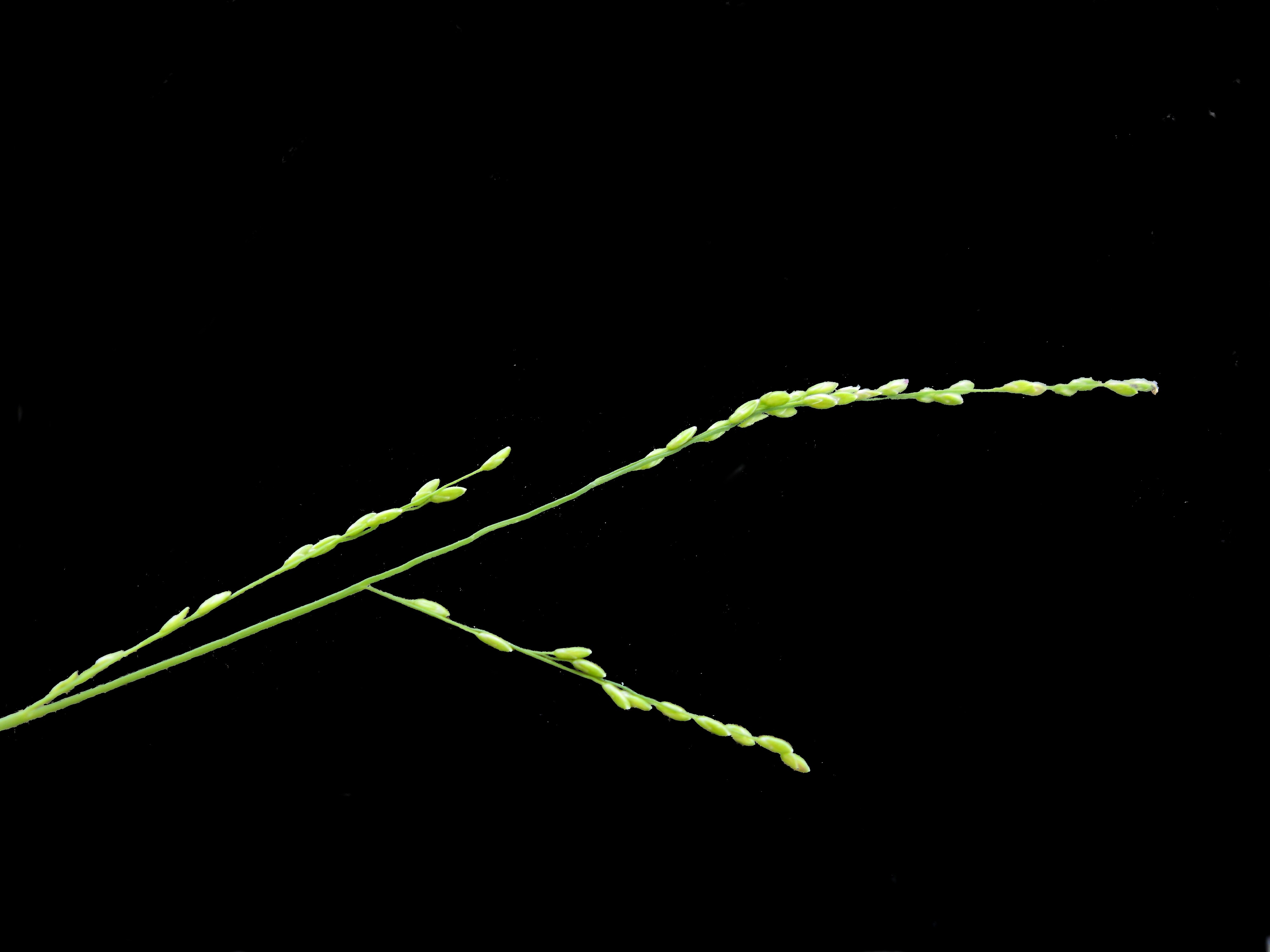
- Ottochloa gracillima

Scientific classification
- Kingdom: Plantae
- Clade: Tracheophytes
- Clade: Angiosperms
- Clade: Monocots
- Clade: Commelinids
- Order: Poales
- Family: Poaceae
- Subfamily: Panicoideae
- Supertribe: Panicodae
- Tribe: Paniceae
- Subtribe: Boivinellinae
- Genus: Ottochloa; Dandy

Type species
- Ottochloa nodosa (Kunth) Dandy

Synonyms
- Hemigymnia Stapf 1920, illegitimate homonym not Griff. 1842 (Boraginaceae)

= Ottochloa =

Genus of grasses

Ottochloa is a genus of African, Asian, and Australian plants in the grass family.

Species

- Ottochloa gracillima C.E.Hubb. - Queensland, New South Wales
- Ottochloa grandiflora Jansen - New Guinea
- Ottochloa nodosa (Kunth) Dandy - tropical Africa, Indian subcontinent, China, Southeast Asia, New Guinea, Queensland, Northern Territory, Western Australia
