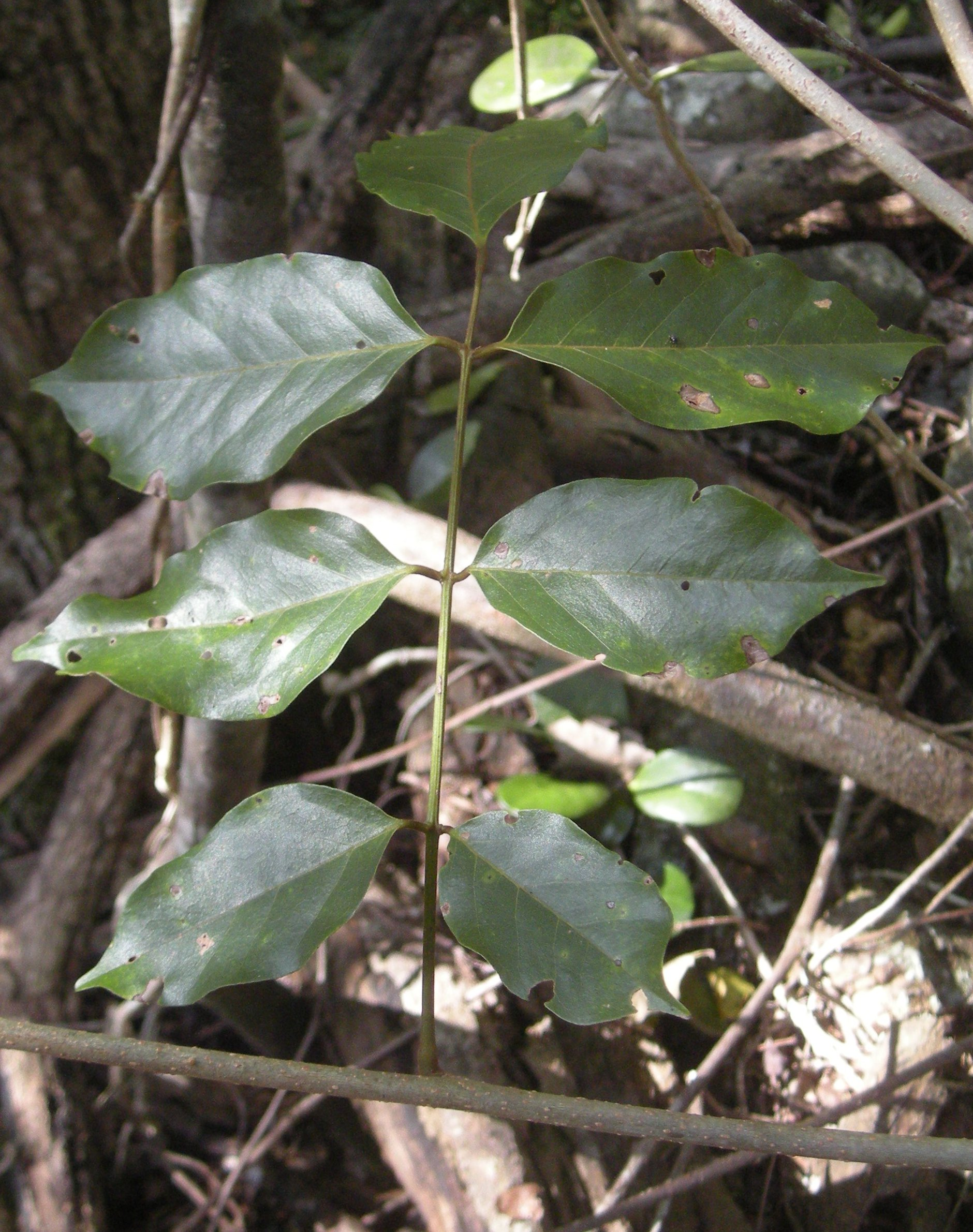
- Austrosteenisia blackii

Scientific classification
- Kingdom: Plantae
- Clade: Tracheophytes
- Clade: Angiosperms
- Clade: Eudicots
- Clade: Rosids
- Order: Fabales
- Family: Fabaceae
- Subfamily: Faboideae
- Tribe: Millettieae
- Genus: Austrosteenisia; R.Geesink (1984)

Species
- Austrosteenisia blackii (F.Muell.) R.Geesink; Austrosteenisia glabristyla Jessup; Austrosteenisia mollitricha D.J.Dixon; Austrosteenisia stipularis (C.T.White) Jessup

= Austrosteenisia =

Genus of legumes

Austrosteenisia is a genus of flowering plants in the family Fabaceae. It belongs to the subfamily Faboideae. It includes four species native to New Guinea and eastern Australia.

- Austrosteenisia blackii (F.Muell.) R.Geesink – eastern New Guinea, Queensland, and New South Wales
- Austrosteenisia glabristyla Jessup – southeastern Queensland and northeastern New South Wales
- Austrosteenisia mollitricha D.J.Dixon – Queensland
- Austrosteenisia stipularis (C.T.White) Jessup – Queensland
