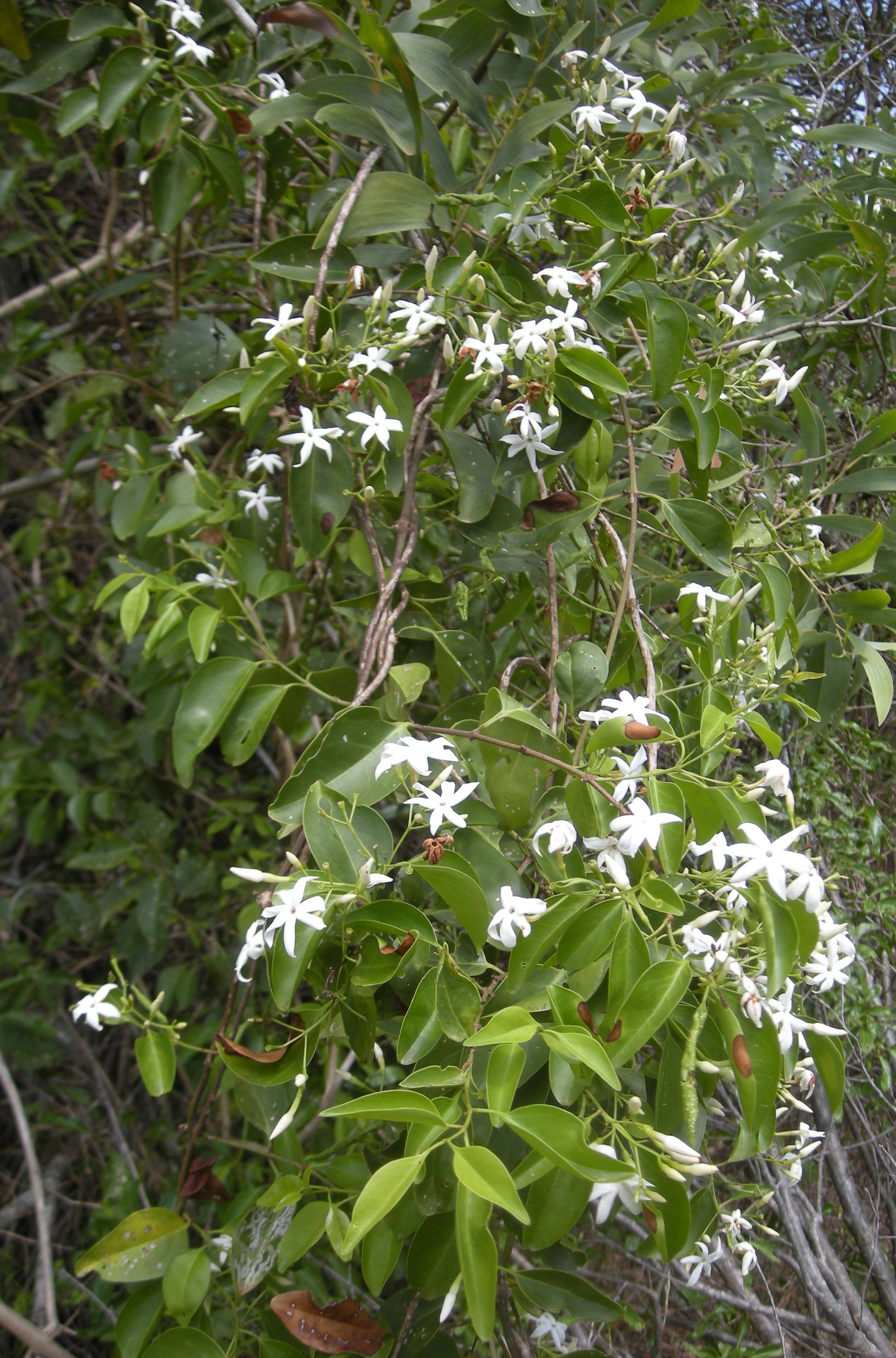
- Leaves and flowers of Jasminum volubile

Scientific classification
- Kingdom: Plantae
- Clade: Tracheophytes
- Clade: Angiosperms
- Clade: Eudicots
- Clade: Asterids
- Order: Lamiales
- Family: Oleaceae
- Genus: Jasminum
- Species: J. volubile

Binomial name
- Jasminum volubile Jacq.

Synonyms
- Jasminum simplicifolium subsp. australiense P.S.Green

= Jasminum volubile =

Stiff jasmine

Species of shrub

Jasminum volubile, the stiff jasmine, is a shrub or creeper from the olive family found in Australia. It may reach two metres in height as a shrub, but it can climb with stems to ten metres long. The plant's stems are mostly without hairs.

The habitat is on the edge of rainforests, north from Singleton, New South Wales into the state of Queensland and west to the Northern Territory and Western Australia. It also occurs on Lord Howe Island.

Leaves are egg-shaped to lanceolate 3 to 7 cm long, 1 to 4 cm wide. Leaf veins are raised both above and below the leaf. The top of the leaf is a dark shiny green, below it is paler. The leaf stem is 5 to 10 mm long. White flowers appear in winter. The fruit is a fleshy black shining berry, around 10 mm in diameter.
