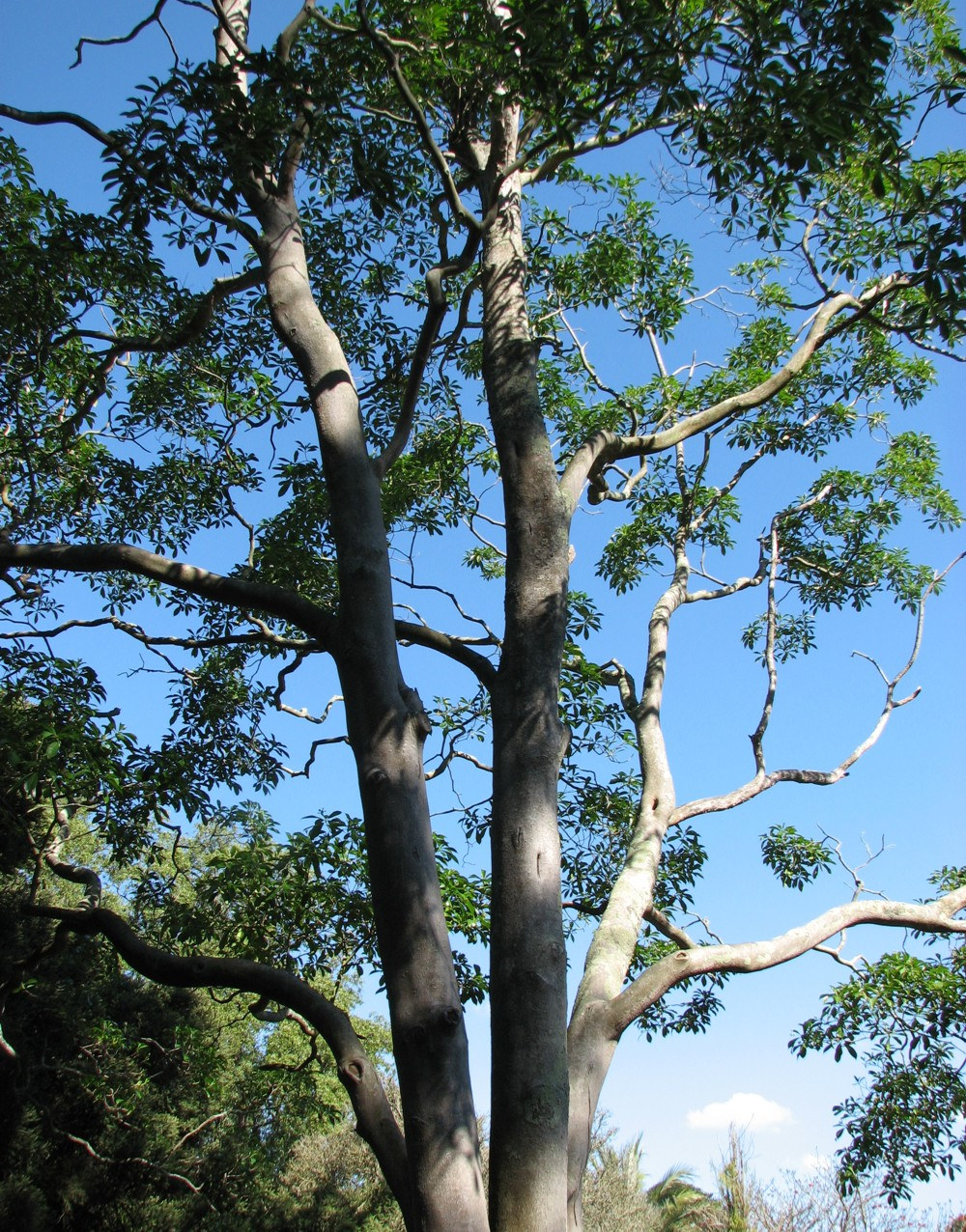

Conservation status
- Least Concern (IUCN 3.1)

Scientific classification
- Kingdom: Plantae
- Clade: Tracheophytes
- Clade: Angiosperms
- Clade: Eudicots
- Clade: Asterids
- Order: Apiales
- Family: Pittosporaceae
- Genus: Hymenosporum; R.Br. ex F.Muell.
- Species: H. flavum

Binomial name
- Hymenosporum flavum (Hook.) F.Muell.

Synonyms
- Pittosporum flavum Hook.

= Hymenosporum =

Native frangipani

Genus of trees

Hymenosporum is a plant genus in the family Pittosporaceae. It contains only one species, Hymenosporum flavum, commonly known as native frangipani, which is native to the rainforests and wet sclerophyll forests of New Guinea and in Queensland and New South Wales in Australia. Despite its common name, it is not closely related to the frangipani, but is related to the widespread genus Pittosporum.

== Description ==
Hymenosporum flavum is a semi-deciduous tree up to 25 m (82 ft) high and a trunk diameter (DBH) to 45 cm (18 in). The obovate leaves are simple, alternate, glossy green above and lighter below. They measure up to 13 cm (5.1 in) long by 4.5 cm (1.8 in) wide. and are clustered towards the ends of the branches in pseudo-whorls.

The very fragrant flowers are quite large, about 40 mm (1.6 in) diameter with a floral tube up to 28 mm (1.1 in) long. They are initially functionally male, and coloured white with lemon tinges. Over a period of about 5 days the stigma begins to develop and the stamens curl away. At the same time the colour deepens until the fully functioning female flower is golden yellow with red/purple track lines in the throat.

The fruit is a dehiscent, two-chambered capsule, black/brown, densely hairy and about 35 mm (1.4 in) wide and long. Seeds are about 7 mm (0.28 in) long with a 4 mm (0.16 in) wing. They are numerous, and stacked together to fill each chamber.

=== Phenology ===
Flowering occurs from early spring to early summer, and the fruit ripen around May.

== Taxonomy ==
This species was first described in 1854 by the English botanist and illustrator William Jackson Hooker as Pittosporum flavum. In 1860 the German born Australian botanist Ferdinand von Mueller transferred it to the genus Hymenosporum in his work Fragmenta phytographiæ Australiæ.

=== Etymology ===
The genus name Hymenosporum is derived from the Ancient Greek words humḗn, meaning membrane, and sporā́, meaning seed. It is a reference to the winged seeds. The species epithet flavum is from the Latin flāvus, yellow, and refers to the flower colour.

== Distribution and habitat ==
The native range of Hymenosporum flavum is from New Guinea south through coastal Queensland to northeastern New South Wales. It grows in rainforest or wet sclerophyll forest on various soils.

== Cultivation ==
Native frangipani is widely cultivated and usually grows to around 8 metres in height although it can grow to over 20 metres tall in the rainforest. It can be grown in shaded positions, but flowers best in full sun.

In Australia, the tree is commonly planted in suburban streets, in shopping boulevards and in walkways between tall buildings. It prefers a well-drained soil with a high organic content, but is highly adaptable. Very young seedlings are easily killed by frosts but if kept in a sheltered position until about 1–1.5 metres high, will thrive in cooler areas, as long as they have access to water during hot dry spells.

Hymenosporum flavum is included in the Tasmanian Fire Service's list of low flammability plants, indicating that it is suitable for growing within a building protection zone.

== Gallery ==
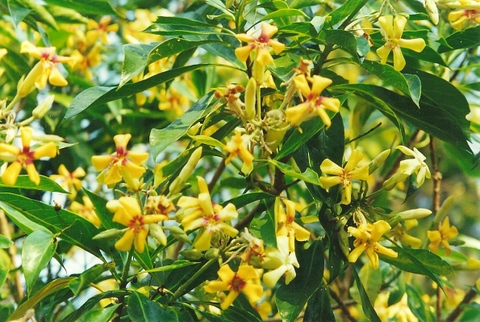
Flowering at Port Macquarie

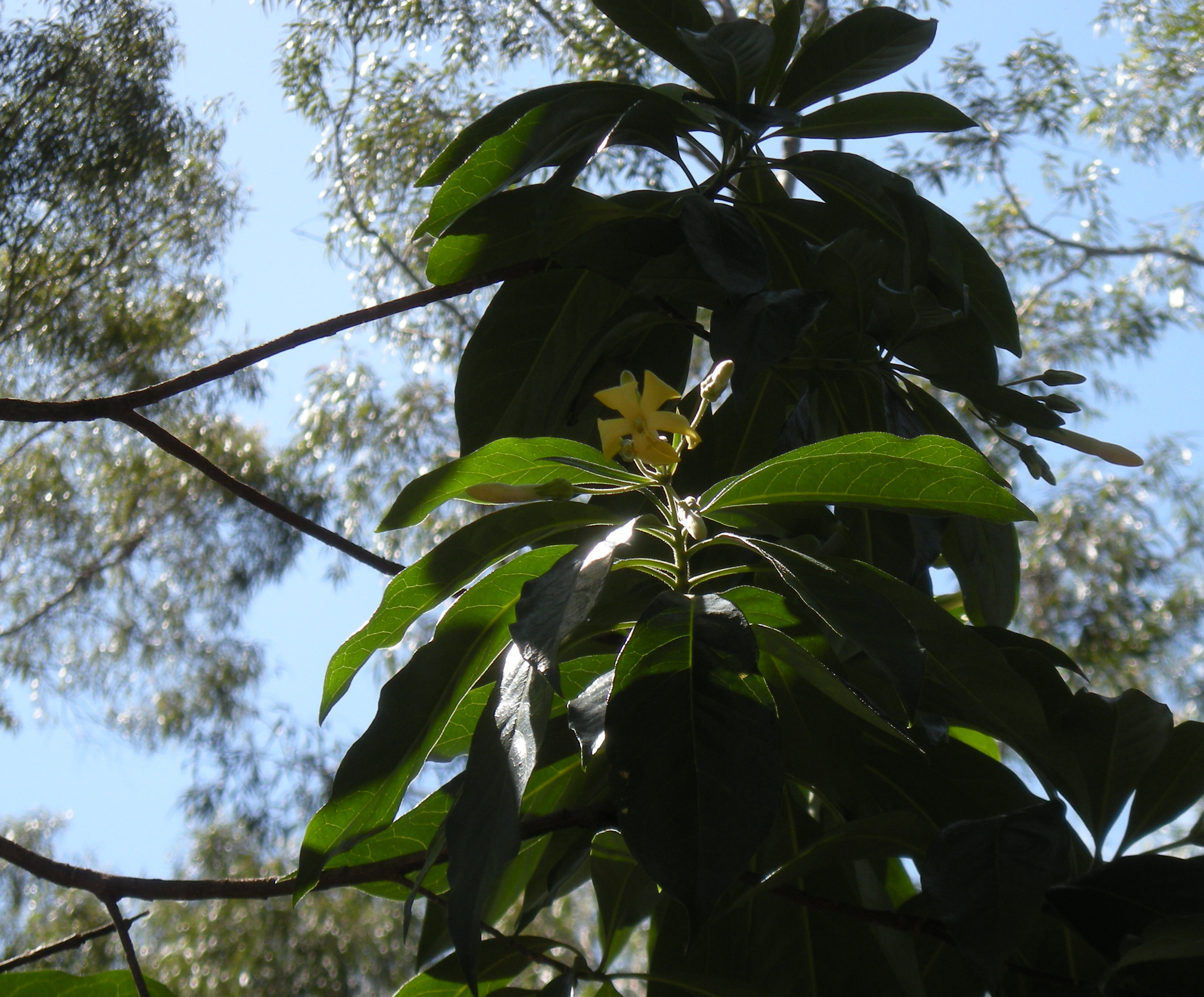
Flowers

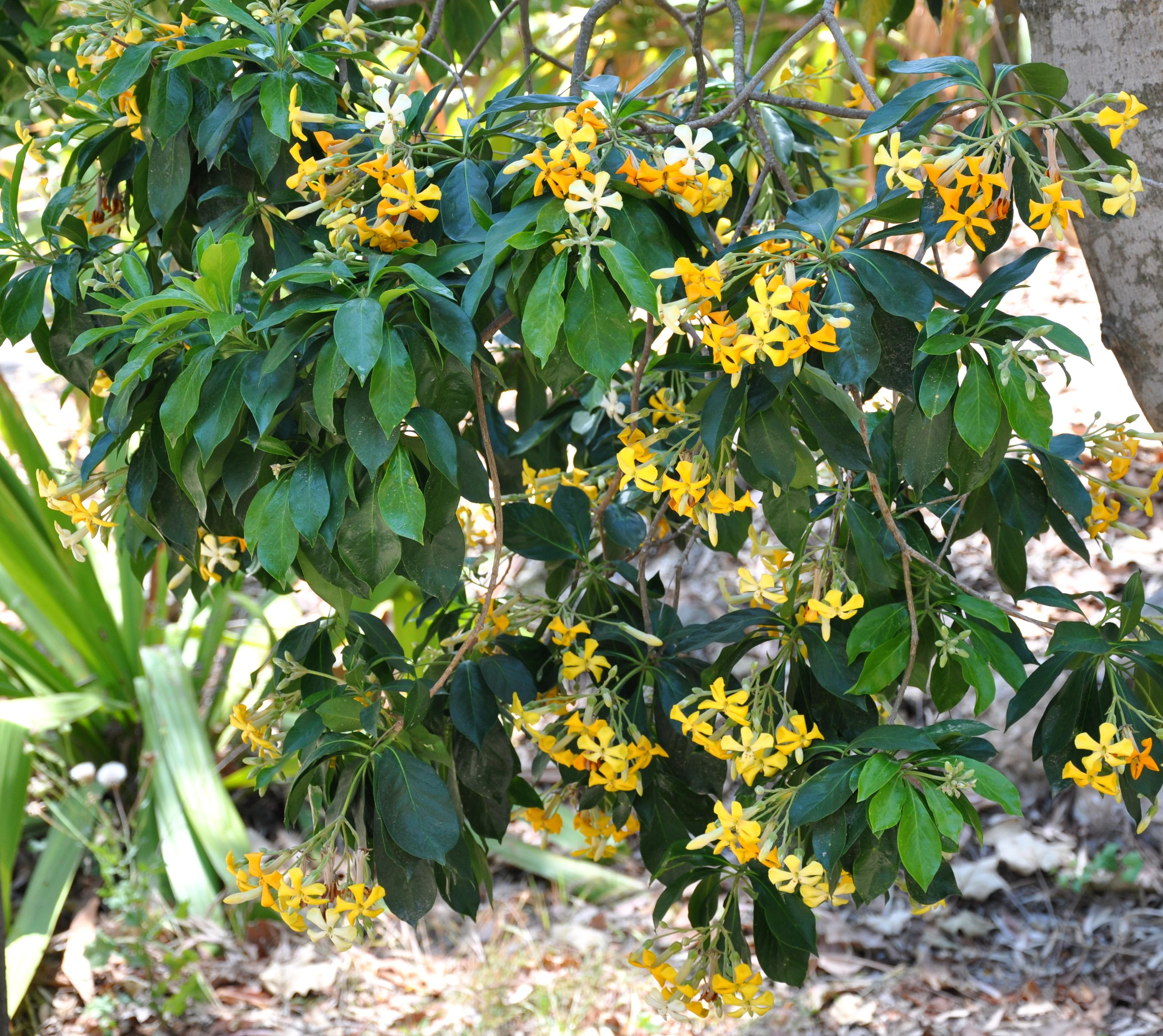
Leaves and flowers

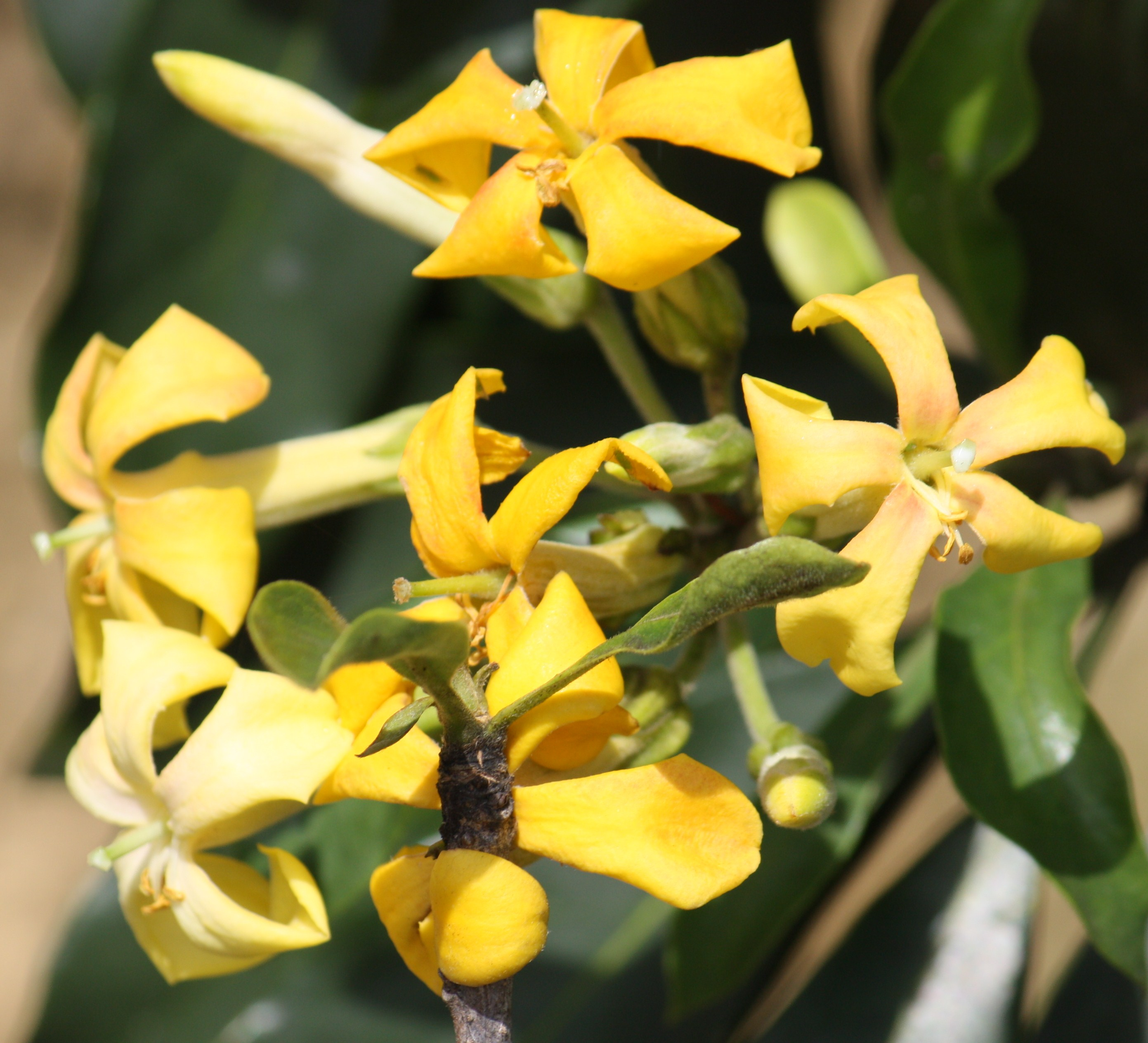
Flowers close up

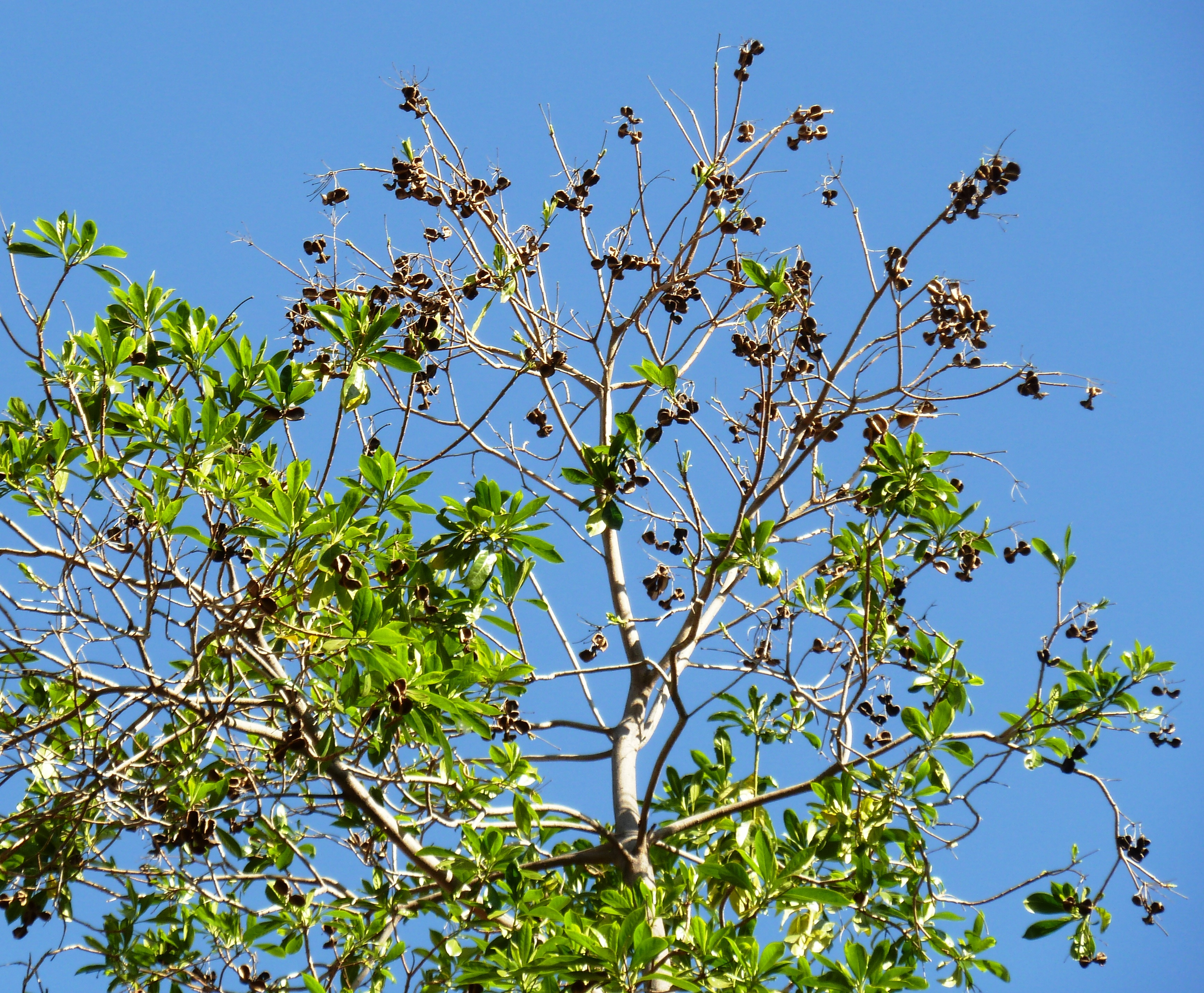
Seed capsules

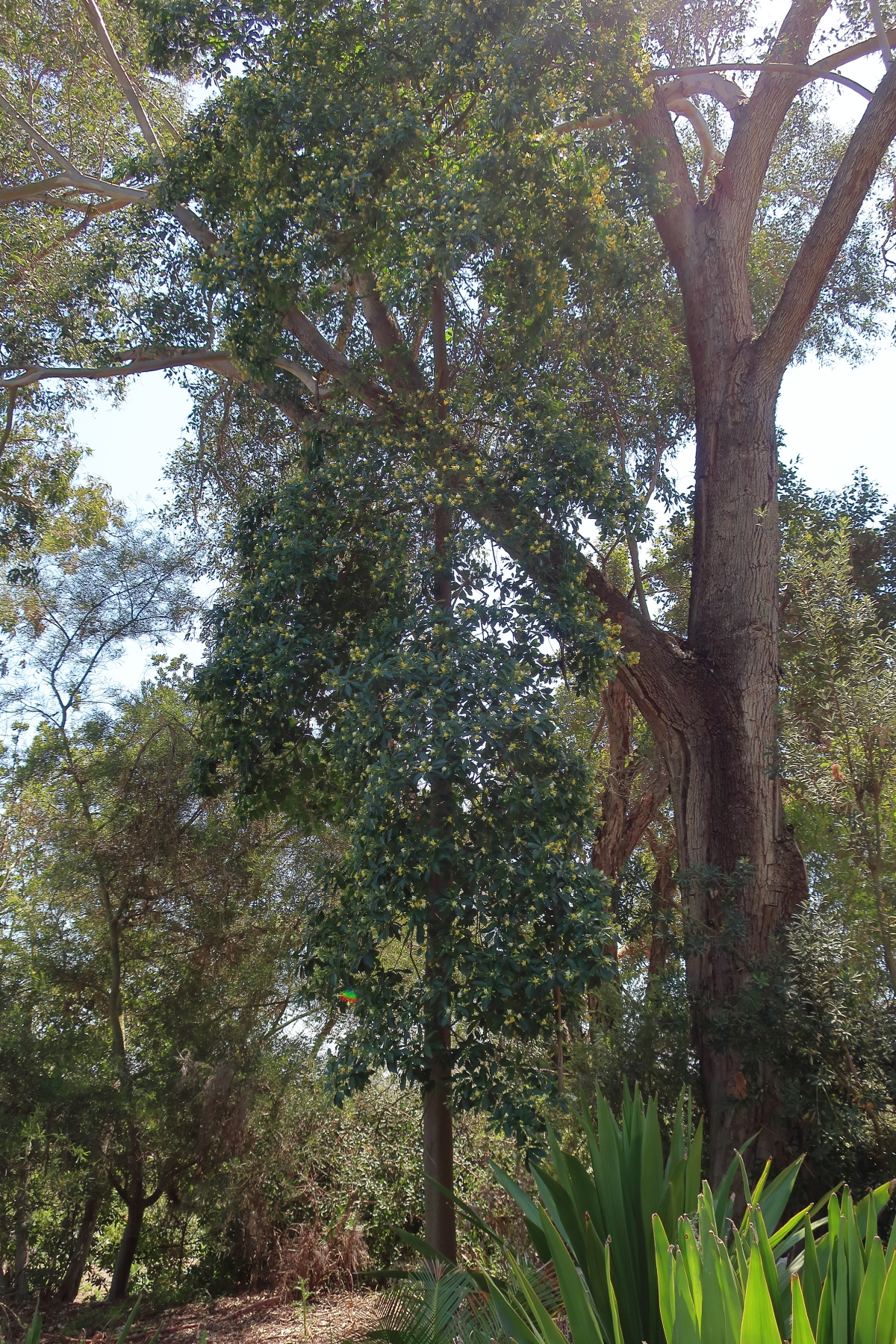
Mature tree flowering

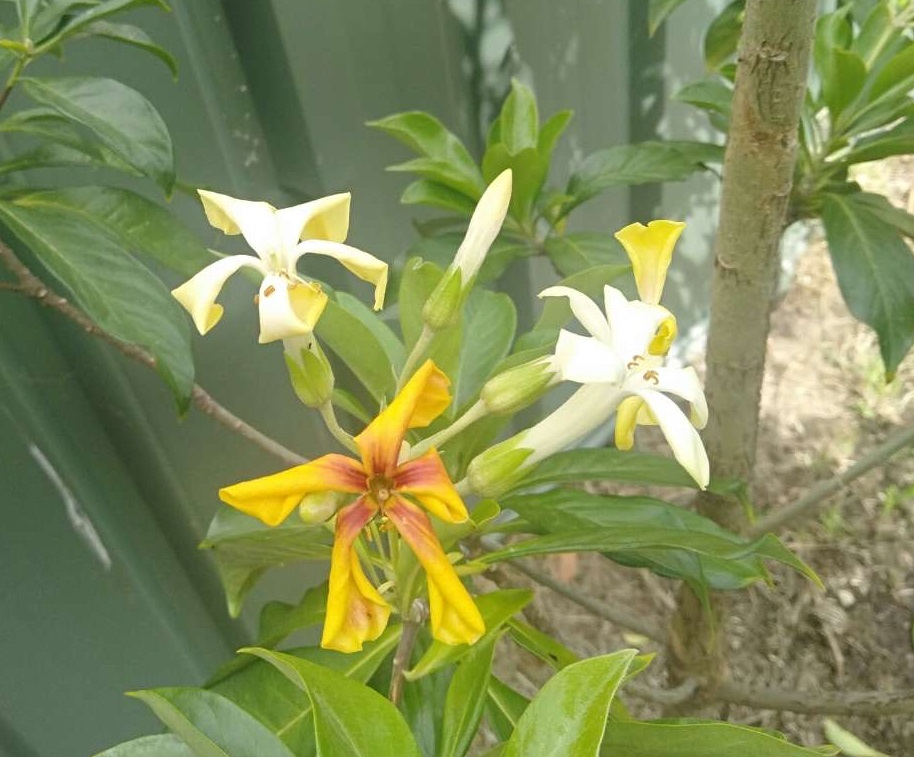
Flowers

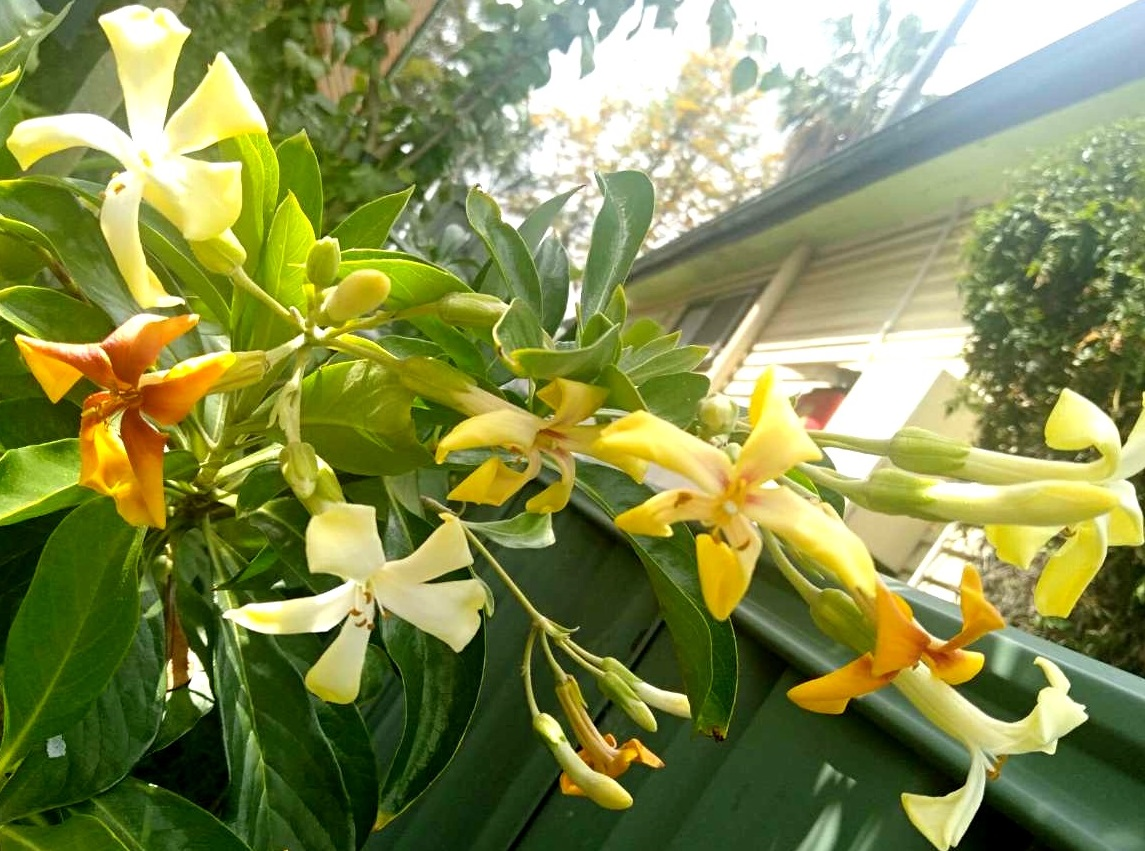
Flowers start as white, then age to yellow and finally coppery orange.
