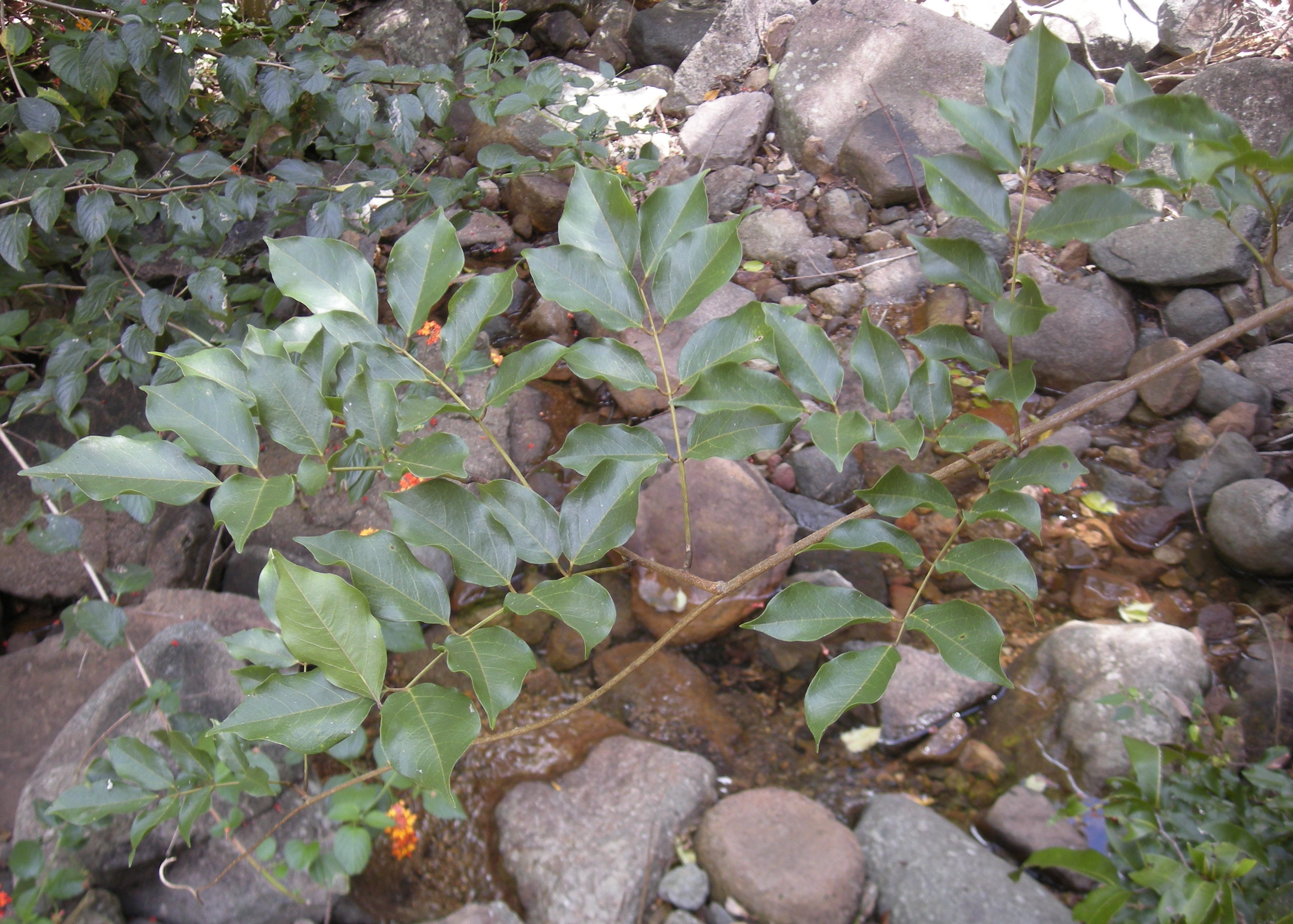

Scientific classification
- Kingdom: Plantae
- Clade: Tracheophytes
- Clade: Angiosperms
- Clade: Eudicots
- Clade: Rosids
- Order: Fabales
- Family: Fabaceae
- Subfamily: Faboideae
- Genus: Austrosteenisia
- Species: A. blackii

Binomial name
- Austrosteenisia blackii (F.Muell.) Geesink

= Austrosteenisia blackii =

Species of legume

Austrosteenisia blackii is a leguminous liana of the rainforests and dry rainforests of tropical and sub-tropical eastern Australia. Also known commonly as the blood vine for the dark red sap that exudes from cut stems. Blooms resemble dark red peas and produce papery fruit up to 12 cm long with kidney-shaped seeds. It is a vigorous creeper and can be used as ground cover in gardening. It is spectacular in bloom from September to December.
