= Sea Acres National Park =

National park in New South Wales, Australia

- IUCN category II (national park)
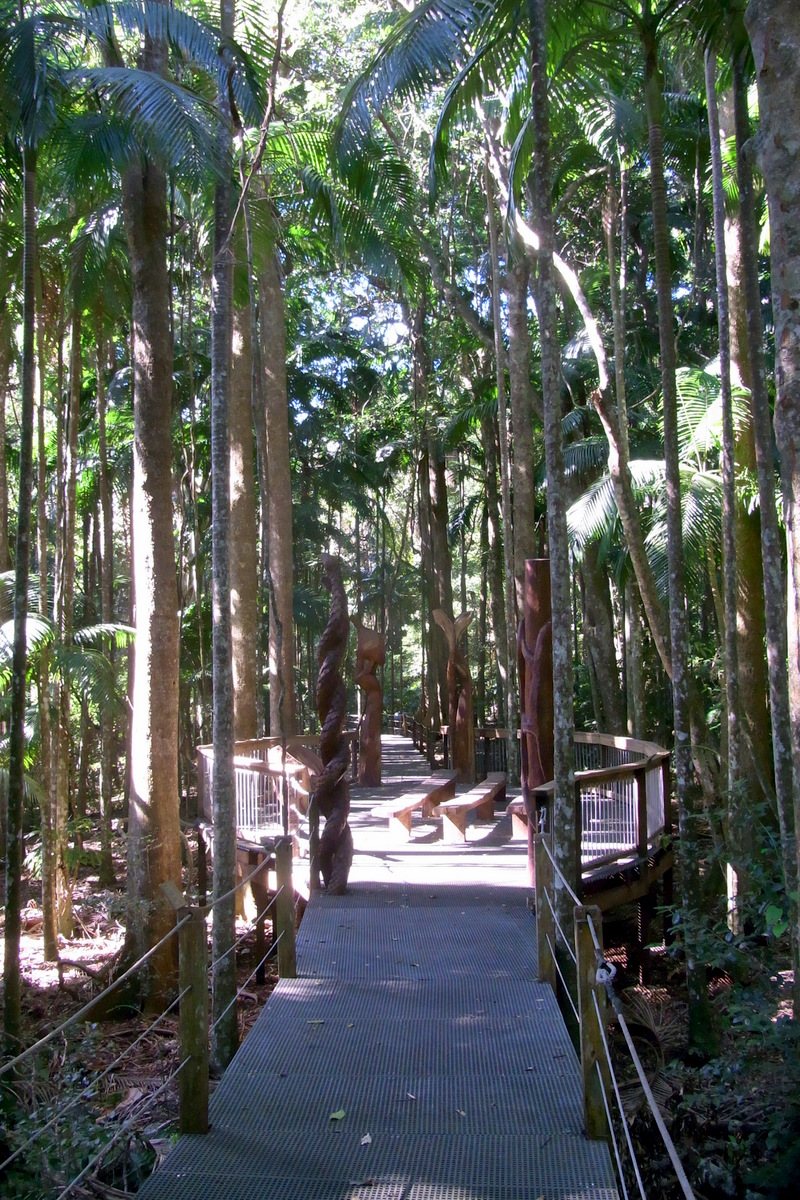
- Boardwalk at Sea Acres

- Location within New South Wales
- Location: New South Wales
- Nearest city: Port Macquarie
- Coordinates: 31°27′50″S 152°55′53″E
- Area: 0.76 km^{2} (0.29 sq mi)
- Established: 11 March 1987
- Governing body: NSW National Parks and Wildlife Service
- Website: Official website

The Sea Acres National Park is a national park in the Mid North Coast region of New South Wales, in eastern Australia. The 76-hectare (190-acre) park is situated near the town of Port Macquarie. The park is a popular tourist area with a 1.3-kilometre (0.81 mi) long boardwalk through a remnant of seaside rainforest. There is also an education centre and cafe. The park was initially declared as a nature reserve in 1987; and gazetted as a national park in October 2010.

== Features ==
=== Fauna ===
Recorded within the reserve are over a hundred types of bird species. Rare species include the wompoo fruit-dove, rose-crowned fruit-dove and osprey. Reptiles include the lace monitor, land mullet and the diamond python. Twenty-one species of mammals have been recorded in the national park, including koala, spotted-tail quoll and the little bent-wing bat. Two rare types of snail are known here.

=== Flora ===
Sea Acres National Park contains one of the largest and most intact segments of coastal rainforest in New South Wales. The remnant rainforest area adjacent to Shelley Beach is noteworthy as much of this sea side type of forest has been cleared for agriculture, mining or housing. Common species of tree include tuckeroo, coogara, red olive berry, white walnut, flintwood, strangler fig, sour cherry, Francis watergum, maiden's blush and mock olive.

Vines are common; they include lawyer vine, supplejack, and water vine. Walking stick palms and Bangalow palms are often seen. Epiphytes are common in the taller more protected areas; such as the staghorn and elkhorn ferns. The hare's foot fern is an interesting climbing plant in the rainforest. The taller areas in the gully may be considered more sub-tropical rather than littoral rainforest.

The widespread sea hibiscus is found at its southernmost limit of natural distribution at Sea Acres. Another similarly widespread coastal plant is also found at or very close to its southern limit, the screw pine. This plant is usually associated with Pacific islands in the tropics. The rare flat fork fern was recorded at Sea Acres, but its exact location is currently unknown.

Rainforest botanist Alexander Floyd suggests that Sea Acres and similar beachside rainforests near Port Macquarie may be botanical refugia from a warmer period.

There are also non-rainforest areas which include grassland, banksia woodland and eucalyptus forest with tallowwood, blackbutt and Sydney blue gum.

=== Weeds and pests ===
There are infestations of lantana, morning glory and bitou bush in the park. Dumping of garden refuse makes the problem worse. Feral dogs, foxes and cats have a negative impact upon local wildlife.

== Gallery ==
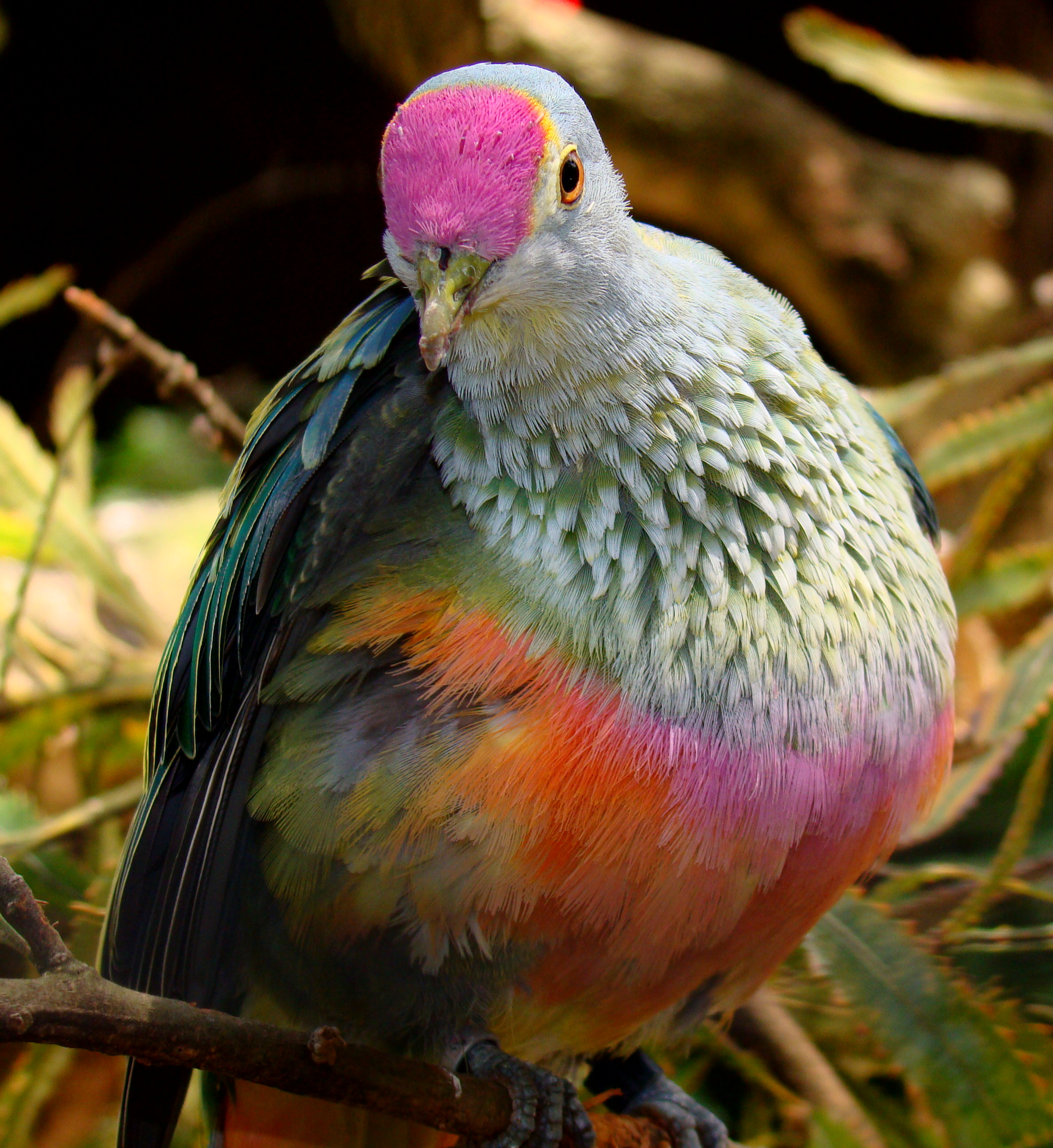
Rose-crowned fruit dove

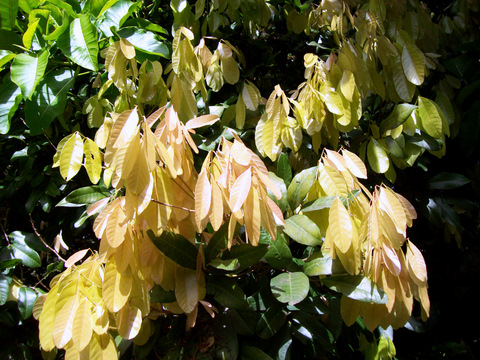
Coogara

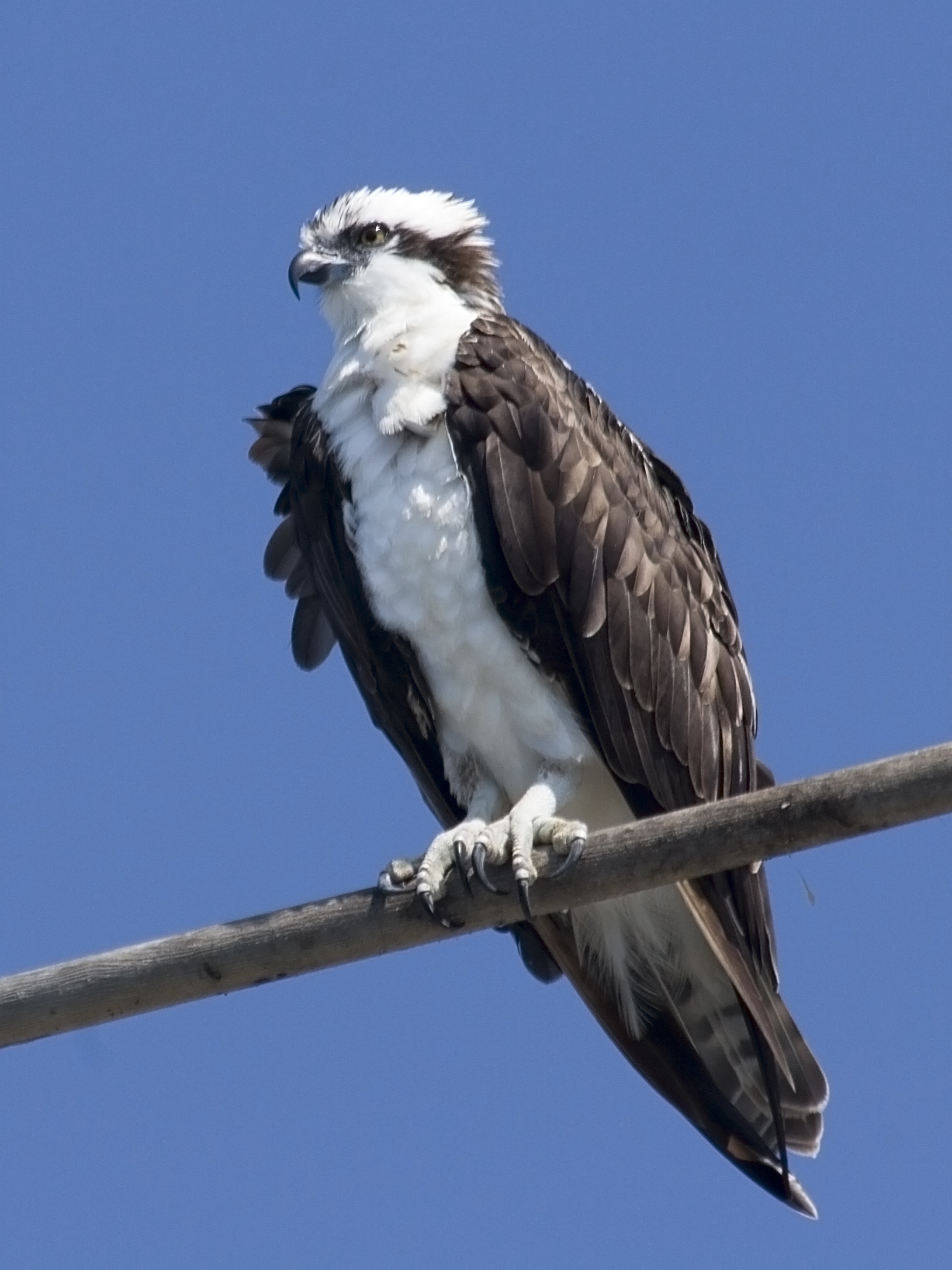
Osprey

== See also ==
- Protected areas of New South Wales
