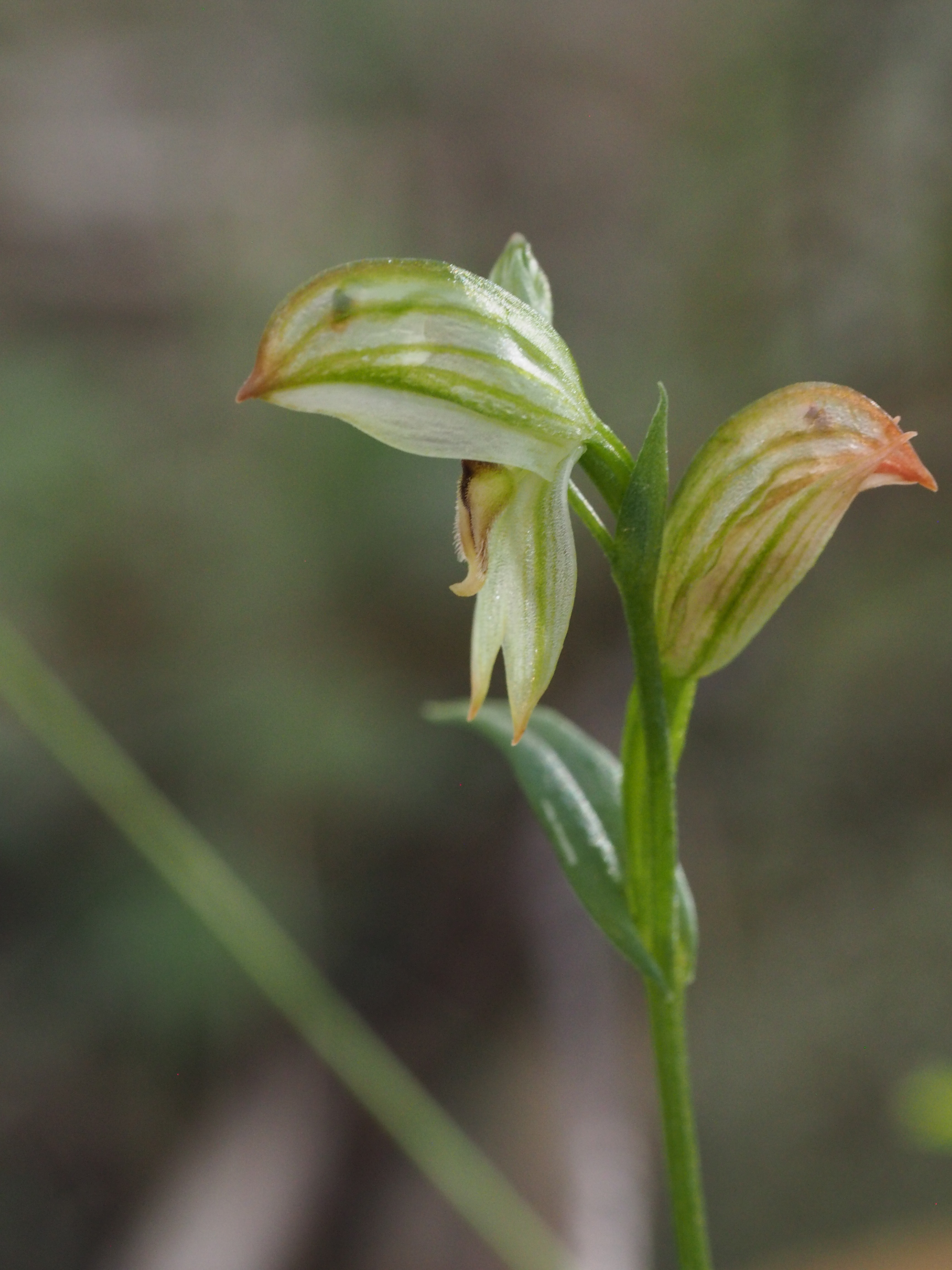
- At the type location

Scientific classification
- Kingdom: Plantae
- Clade: Tracheophytes
- Clade: Angiosperms
- Clade: Monocots
- Order: Asparagales
- Family: Orchidaceae
- Subfamily: Orchidoideae
- Tribe: Cranichideae
- Genus: Pterostylis
- Species: P. major

Binomial name
- Pterostylis major (D.L.Jones) G.N.Backh.

Synonyms
- Bunochilus major D.L.Jones; Bunochilus majus D.L.Jones orth. var.

= Pterostylis major =

Species of orchid

Pterostylis major is a plant in the orchid family Orchidaceae and is endemic to New South Wales where it grows on the Northern Tablelands. As with similar greenhoods, the flowering plants differ from those which are not flowering. The non-flowering plants have a rosette of leaves on a short stalk but the flowering plants lack a rosette and have up to eleven well-spaced, bright green flowers with darker stripes, on a flowering stem with stem leaves.

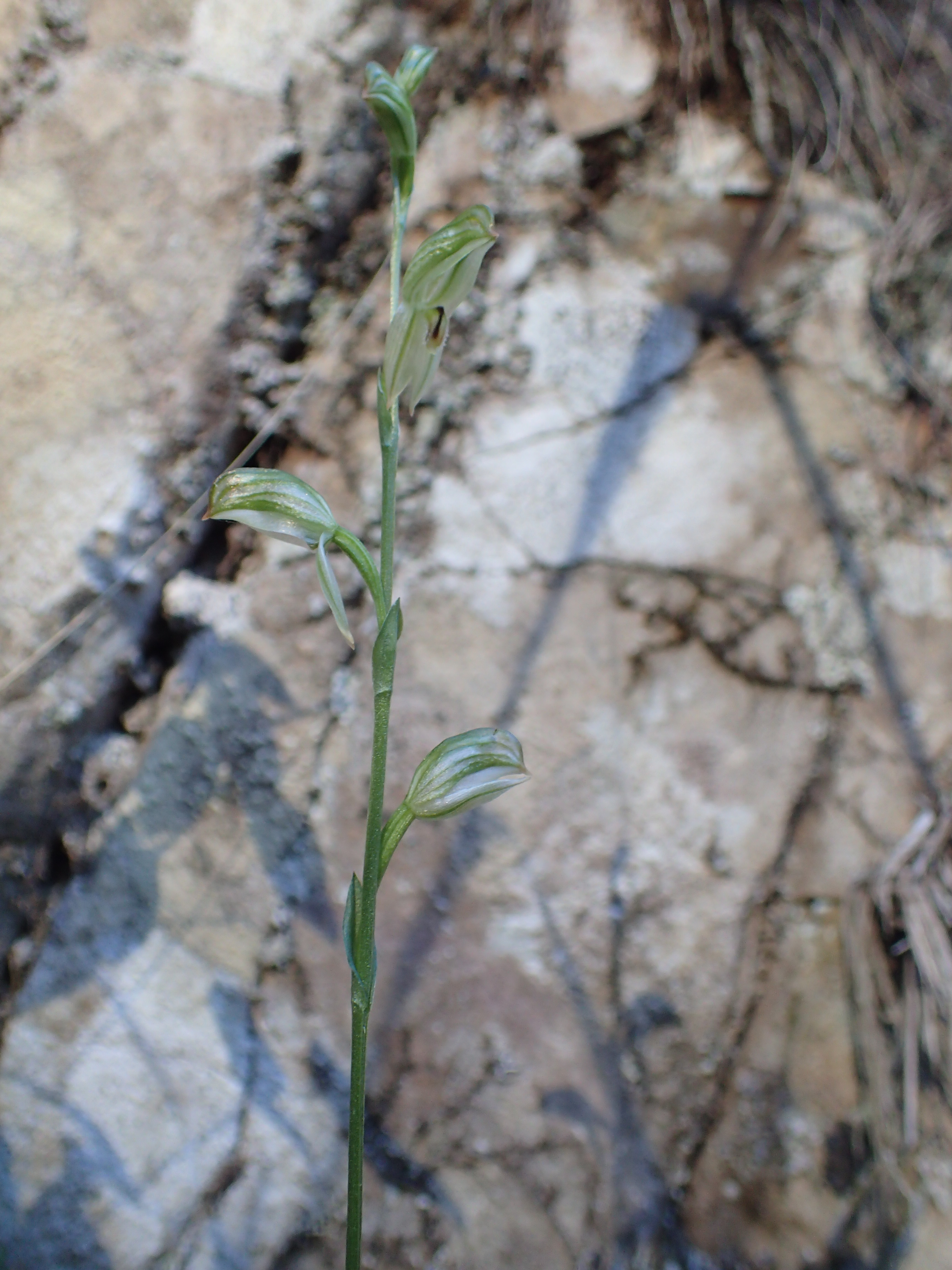
Pterostylis major habit in the Copeland Tops S.C.A.

== Description ==
Pterostylis major is a terrestrial, perennial, deciduous, herb with an underground tuber. Non-flowering plants have a rosette of between three and six leaves, each leaf 8–40 mm (0.3–2 in) long and 4–8 mm (0.2–0.3 in) wide on a stalk 50–120 mm (2–5 in) high. Flowering plants lack a rosette but have up to eleven flowers on a flowering spike 120–650 mm (5–30 in) high with between five and seven linear to lance-shaped stem leaves which are 15–95 mm (0.6–4 in) long and 2–8 mm (0.08–0.3 in) wide. The flowers are well-spaced, 14–18 mm (0.6–0.7 in) long, 6.5–8.5 mm (0.26–0.33 in) wide and translucent bright green with darker green stripes. The dorsal sepal and petals are joined to form a hood called the "galea" over the column. The dorsal sepal is 12–15 mm (0.5–0.6 in) long and shallowly curved. The petals are oblong, 13–15 mm (0.5–0.6 in) long, about 3 mm (0.1 in) wide and are also shallowly curved. The lateral sepals are fused to form a single structure 13–16 mm (0.5–0.6 in) long and 6.5–8.5 mm (0.26–0.33 in) wide with a central notch 4–5.5 mm (0.16–0.22 in) deep. The labellum is egg-shaped to oblong, 5.5–7 mm (0.2–0.3 in) long, 2–3 mm (0.08–0.1 in) wide, pale to yellowish green with a brown to blackish line along the middle. Flowering occurs from April to September.

== Taxonomy and naming ==
This species was first formally described in 2006 by David Jones and given the name Bunochilus major (although initially the orthographical variant Bunochilus majus). The description was published in the journal Australian Orchid Research from a specimen collected along the Point Lookout Road from the Waterfall Way. In 2010, Gary Backhouse changed the name to Pterostylis major. The specific epithet (major) is a Latin word meaning "large" or "great", referring to the larger size of this species compared to the similar Pterostylis longifolia.

== Distribution and habitat ==
Pterostylis major grows with grasses and shrubs in tall forest on the New England Tableland and south to the Barrington Tops.
