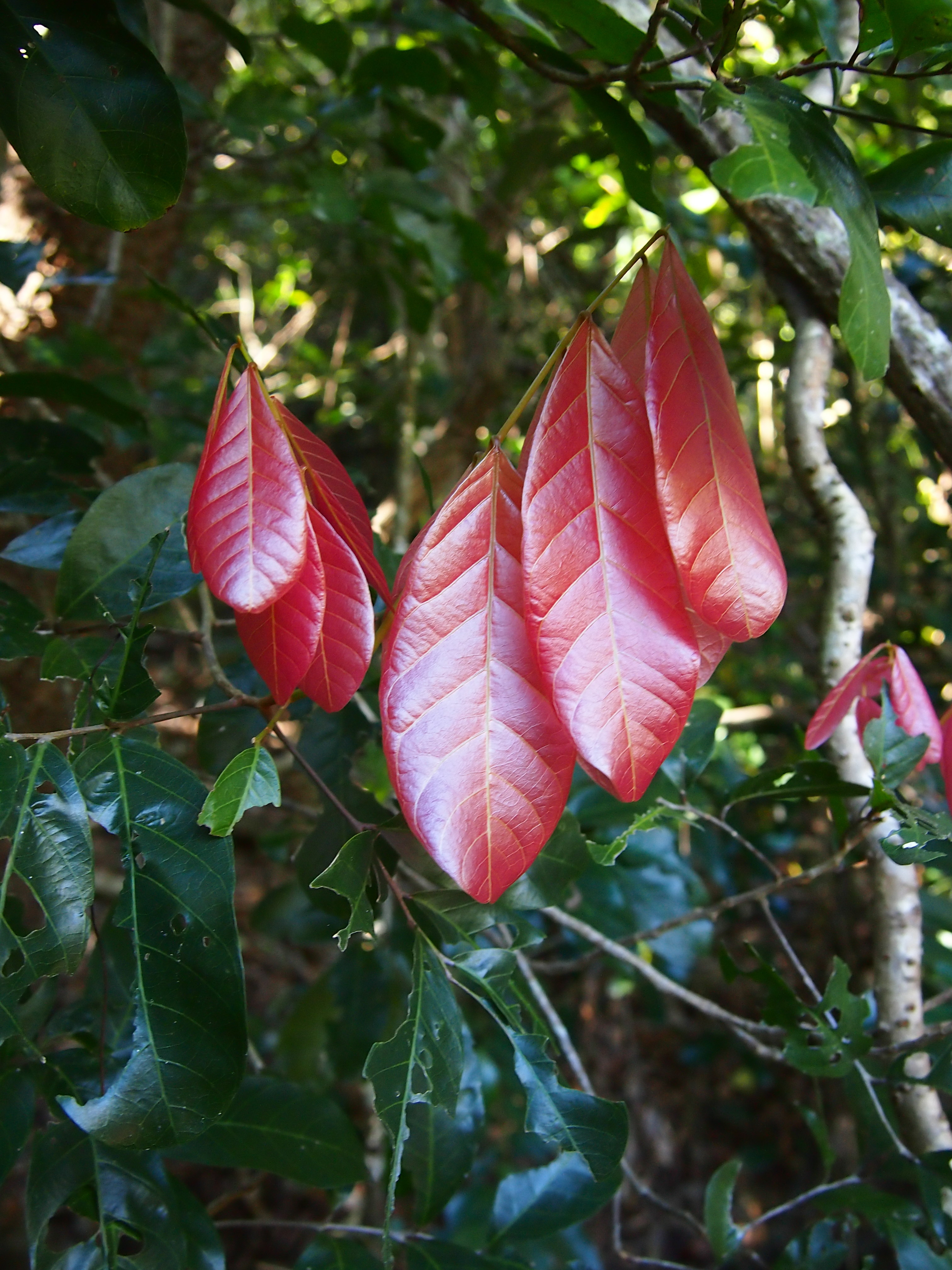
- Arytera divaricata colourful red new growth

Scientific classification
- Kingdom: Plantae
- Clade: Tracheophytes
- Clade: Angiosperms
- Clade: Eudicots
- Clade: Rosids
- Order: Sapindales
- Family: Sapindaceae
- Subfamily: Sapindoideae
- Genus: Arytera; Blume

Type species
- Arytera littoralis Blume

Species
- See text

= Arytera =

Genus of flowering plants

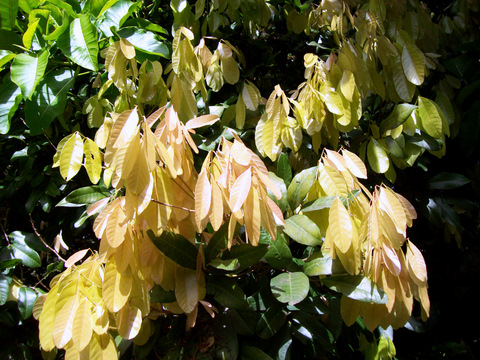
Arytera divaricata colourful orange new growth

Arytera is a genus of about twenty–eight species known to science, of trees and shrubs and constituting part of the plant family Sapindaceae. They grow naturally in New Guinea, Indonesia, New Caledonia, Australia, the Solomon Islands, Vanuatu, Fiji, Samoa, Tonga; and the most widespread species and type species A. littoralis grows throughout Malesia and across Southeast Asia, from NE. India, southern China, Borneo, Malaysia, Singapore, Indonesia and the Philippines to as far east as New Guinea and the Solomon Islands.

The eleven Australian species may have the common name coogera and they grow naturally in the rainforests of eastern Australia and the Northern Territory.

Formerly included here were three species now in the genus Mischarytera.

== Naming and classification ==
European science formally named and described this genus and the type species in 1847, authored by botanist Carl Ludwig Blume.

In 1879 botanist Ludwig A. T. Radlkofer published formal scientific descriptions of numerous species new to European science.

In 1993 botanist Hubert Turner formally described 8 species new to science found growing naturally in New Guinea, the Solomon Islands and north eastern Australia. In 1994 his treatment of the genus in Flora Malesiana was published.

== Species ==
This listing was sourced from the Australian Plant Name Index and Australian Plant Census, the Australian Tropical Rainforest Plants information system, Flora Malesiana, Fruits of the Australian Tropical Rainforest, the Census of Vascular Plants of Papua New Guinea, the Checklist of the vascular indigenous Flora of New Caledonia, Rainforest trees of Samoa, Flora Vitiensis (Fiji), the Flora of Tonga, the Flora of New South Wales, the Flora of Australia, and Plants of the World Online.

- Arytera bifoliata Whistler – Tonga
- Arytera bifoliolata S.T.Reynolds – New Guinea, NT, Qld, Australia
- Arytera brachyphylla Radlk. – New Guinea
- Arytera densiflora Radlk. – New Guinea
- Arytera dictyoneura S.T.Reynolds – Qld, Australia
- Arytera distylis (Benth.) Radlk. – NSW, Qld, Australia
- Arytera divaricata F.Muell. – NSW, Qld, Australia, New Guinea
- Arytera foveolata F.Muell. – Qld, Australia
- Arytera lepidota Radlk. – New Caledonia endemic
- Arytera lineosquamulata H.Turner – New Guinea, NE. Qld, Australia
- Arytera littoralis Blume – NE. India, SE Asia, S. China, throughout Malesia incl. to New Guinea and Solomon Islands
- Arytera microphylla (Benth.) Radlk. – Qld, Australia
- Arytera miniata H.Turner – New Guinea
- Arytera morobeana H.Turner – New Guinea
- Arytera multijuga H.Turner – New Guinea
- Arytera musca H.Turner – New Guinea
- Arytera novaebrittanniae H.Turner – New Guinea, Solomon Islands
- Arytera oshanesiana (F.Muell.) Radlk. – Qld, Australia
- Arytera pauciflora S.T.Reynolds – Qld, Australia
- Arytera pseudofoveolata H.Turner – New Guinea, Cape York Peninsula, Qld, Australia

Species provisionally named, described and accepted according to the authoritative Australian Plant Census As of June 2014 while awaiting formal publication

- Arytera sp. Dryander Creek (P.R.Sharpe 4184) Qld Herbarium – Qld, Australia

=== Formerly placed here ===
- Lepidocupania arcuata (Radlk.) Buerki, Callm., Munzinger & Lowry (as Arytera arcuata Radlk.) – New Caledonia endemic
- Lepidocupania brackenridgei (A.Gray) Buerki, Callm., Munzinger & Lowry (as Arytera brackenridgei Radlk.) – Fiji, Tonga, Vanuatu, Samoa, Solomon Islands
- Lepidocupania gracilipes (Radlk.) Buerki, Callm., Munzinger & Lowry (as Arytera gracilipes Radlk.) – New Caledonia endemic
- Mischarytera bullata (H.Turner) H.Turner (as Arytera bullata H.Turner) – New Guinea endemic
- Mischarytera lautereriana (F.M.Bailey) H.Turner (as Arytera lautereriana (F.M.Bailey) Radlk.), corduroy tamarind – NE. to SE. Qld Australia endemic
- Mischarytera macrobotrys (Merr. & L.M.Perry) H.Turner (as Arytera macrobotrys (Merr. & L.M.Perry) R.W.Ham) – New Guinea and Cape York Peninsula, Qld, Australia
- Neoarytera chartacea (Radlk.) Callm., Buerki, Munzinger & Lowry (as Arytera chartacea Radlk.) – New Caledonia endemic
- Neoarytera collina (Pancher & Sebert) Callm., Buerki, Munzinger & Lowry (as Arytera collina (Pancher & Sebert) Radlk.) – New Caledonia endemic
- Neoarytera nekorensis (H.Turner) Callm., Buerki, Munzinger & Lowry (as Arytera nekorensis H.Turner) – New Caledonia endemic – vulnerable
- Neoarytera neoebudensis (Guillaumin) Callm., Buerki, Munzinger & Lowry (as Arytera neoebudensis (Guillaumin) H.Turner) – New Guinea, New Caledonia
