= Copeland Tops State Conservation Area =

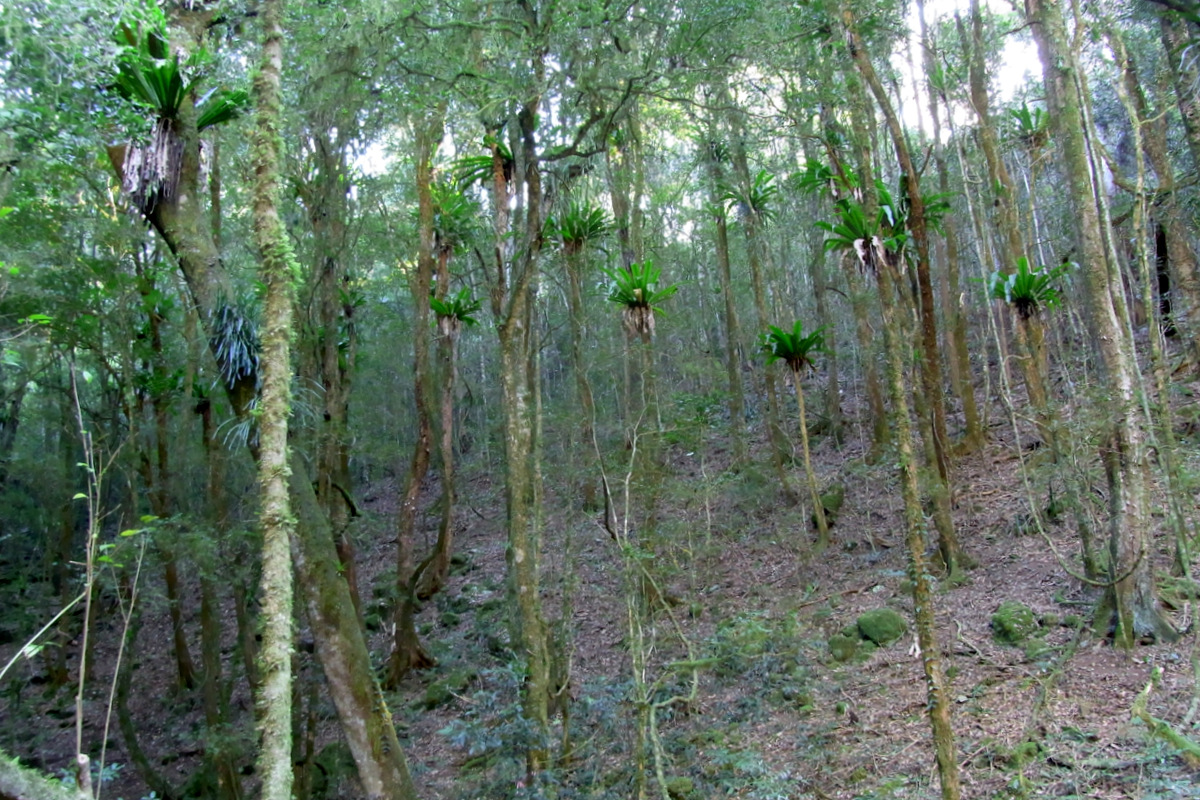
- Bird's nest ferns growing on shatterwood trees at Copeland Tops

- Location within New South Wales
- Location: New South Wales
- Nearest city: Gloucester
- Coordinates: 31°57′45″S 151°48′05″E
- Area: 22.01 km^{2} (8.50 sq mi)
- Established: 1 July 2003
- Governing body: NSW National Parks and Wildlife Service
- Website: http://www.environment.nsw.gov.au/NationalParks/parkHome.aspx?id=N0694

The Copeland Tops State Conservation Area is a protected conservation area located near the Barrington Tops in the Hunter Region of New South Wales, Australia. The 2,201-hectare (5,440-acre) is situated 12 km (7 mi) west of Gloucester.

== Features ==
Relics of the "Mountain Maid" gold mine may be visited with a tour guide. Gold was discovered by timber collectors in 1875. By 1878, around one thousand people were living in the area. Most of the gold mining activity had ceased by 1890. At the end of 1886, the Mountain Maid mine yielded 8,819 ounces (250,000 g) of gold. And the Hidden Treasure mine yielded 9,501 ounces (269,300 g).

Flora include wet sclerophyll eucalyptus forest and a unique "dry" rainforest. Rainforest trees present include shatterwood, black booyong, Moreton Bay fig, and the white cedar. Some of the red cedar grow in excess of 40 metres (130 ft) tall. Of note is the large epiphytic ferns growing in the rainforest, such as birds nest ferns, staghorn fern, and elkhorn ferns.

Koalas, eastern grey kangaroos, red-necked wallabies, wombats, and greater gliders are some of the many marsupial animals found here. Microbats rest in the gold mine shafts during the day.

== See also ==
- Protected areas of New South Wales
