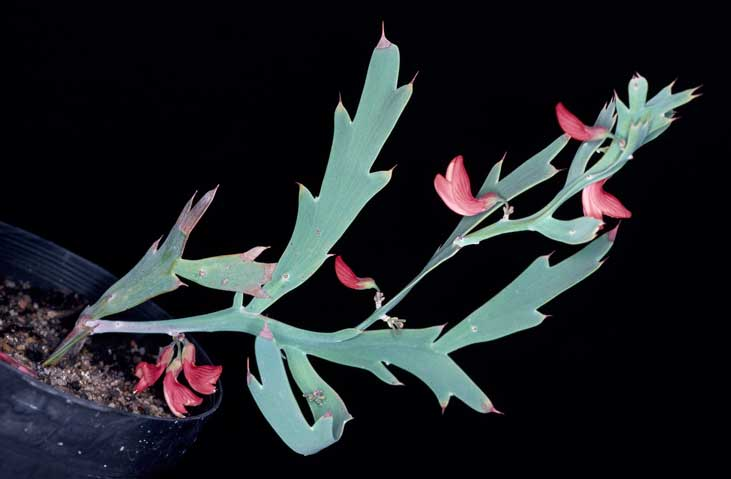
- In the Australian National Botanic Gardens

Scientific classification
- Kingdom: Plantae
- Clade: Tracheophytes
- Clade: Angiosperms
- Clade: Eudicots
- Clade: Rosids
- Order: Fabales
- Family: Fabaceae
- Subfamily: Faboideae
- Genus: Daviesia
- Species: D. epiphyllum

Binomial name
- Daviesia epiphyllum Meisn.

= Daviesia epiphyllum =

Staghorn bush

Species of flowering plant

Daviesia epiphyllum, commonly known as staghorn bush, is a species of flowering plant in the family Fabaceae and is endemic to the south-west of Western Australia. It is a rigid, erect, spreading, glabrous shrub with flattened, staghorn-shaped phylloclades with sharply-pointed lobes, and yellowish-red flowers.

== Description ==
Daviesia epiphyllum is a rigid, erect and spreading, glabrous shrub that typically grows to a height of 0.3–1.5 m (1 ft 0 in – 4 ft 11 in). Its branches are reduced to flattened, staghorn-shaped phylloclades 5–20 mm (0.20–0.79 in) wide, the leaves reduced to oblong phyllodes 3–12 mm (0.12–0.47 in) long and 3–8 mm (0.12–0.31 in) wide with cuspidate, sharply-pointed tips. The flowers are arranged in groups of three to seven on a peduncle 1–2 mm (0.039–0.079 in) long, the rachis 2–4 mm (0.079–0.157 in) long, each flower on a pedicel 4–10 mm (0.16–0.39 in) long with many overlapping bracts about 5 mm (0.20 in) long at the base. The sepals are 9–10 mm (0.35–0.39 in) long and joined at the base, the two upper lobes joined for most of their length and the lower three triangular. The flowers are yellowish-red, the standard broadly elliptic with a deep notch, 23–25 mm (0.91–0.98 in) long and 4.5–5.5 mm (0.18–0.22 in) wide, the wings about 24–26 mm (0.94–1.02 in) long, and the keel about 23–29 mm (0.91–1.14 in) long. Flowering occurs from January to May and the fruit is a leathery, triangular pod 18–21 mm (0.71–0.83 in) long.

== Taxonomy and naming ==
Daviesia epiphyllum was first formally described in 1855 by Carl Meissner in Botanische Zeitung from specimens collected by James Drummond. The specific epithet (epiphyllum) means "upon a leaf", referring to the flowers growing from the phylloclades.

== Distribution and habitat ==
Staghorn bush grows on sandplains in heathland between Bullsbrook, Eneabba and Moora in the Avon Wheatbelt, Geraldton Sandplains and Swan Coastal Plain biogeographic regions of south-western Western Australia.

== Conservation status ==
Daviesia epiphyllum is classified as "not threatened" by the Western Australian Government Department of Biodiversity, Conservation and Attractions.
