= Rainforest Flora =

Botanical garden and nursery in California

Coordinates: 33.8570°N 118.3545°W

Rainforest Flora is a botanical garden and commercial nursery based in Torrance, California. It was founded in 1974 and has become North America's largest producer of Tillandsia.

== History ==
Founder Paul T. Isley III first discovered Tillandsias while studying economics at UCLA in the 1960s. After graduating, he traveled through Mexico and Guatemala collecting specimens. In 1974, he began selling Tillandsias mounted on grapewood at swap meets and arts and crafts fairs in Southern California.

== Facilities ==
The company operates a 16-acre (65,000 m^{2}) retail space in Torrance, California, featuring an indoor garden with waterfalls, koi ponds, and thousands of airplants. Their main production occurs at two facilities in North San Diego County, California, with nearly 300,000 square feet of growing space.

=== 2017 Lilac Fire ===
During the Lilac Fire in December 2017 in San Diego County, Rainforest Flora's growing facilities were seriously damaged

== Production and commercial growth ==
Rainforest Flora began focusing on self-sufficient Tillandsia production in the early 1980s. Despite the challenges of a 6-20 year maturation period from seed to adult plant, the company has successfully grown to house millions of Tillandsias in various growth stages

The company has evolved from selling at craft fairs to becoming a major supplier for large retailers such as Trader Joe's. Their biggest customer is Home Depot.

== Collections ==
Notable collections include:

- Tillandsia and bromeliads from various biogeographical zones
- Neoregelia
- Guzmania and Vriesea
- Platycerium (staghorn ferns)
- Tropical palms and Cycads

== Significance ==
Rainforest Flora stands as the largest producer of Tillandsias in North America and one of the largest globally among nurseries growing their own specimens rather than collecting from the wild. The company has played a significant role in popularizing airplants as decorative houseplants, particularly in urban environments and drought-prone areas like California.
