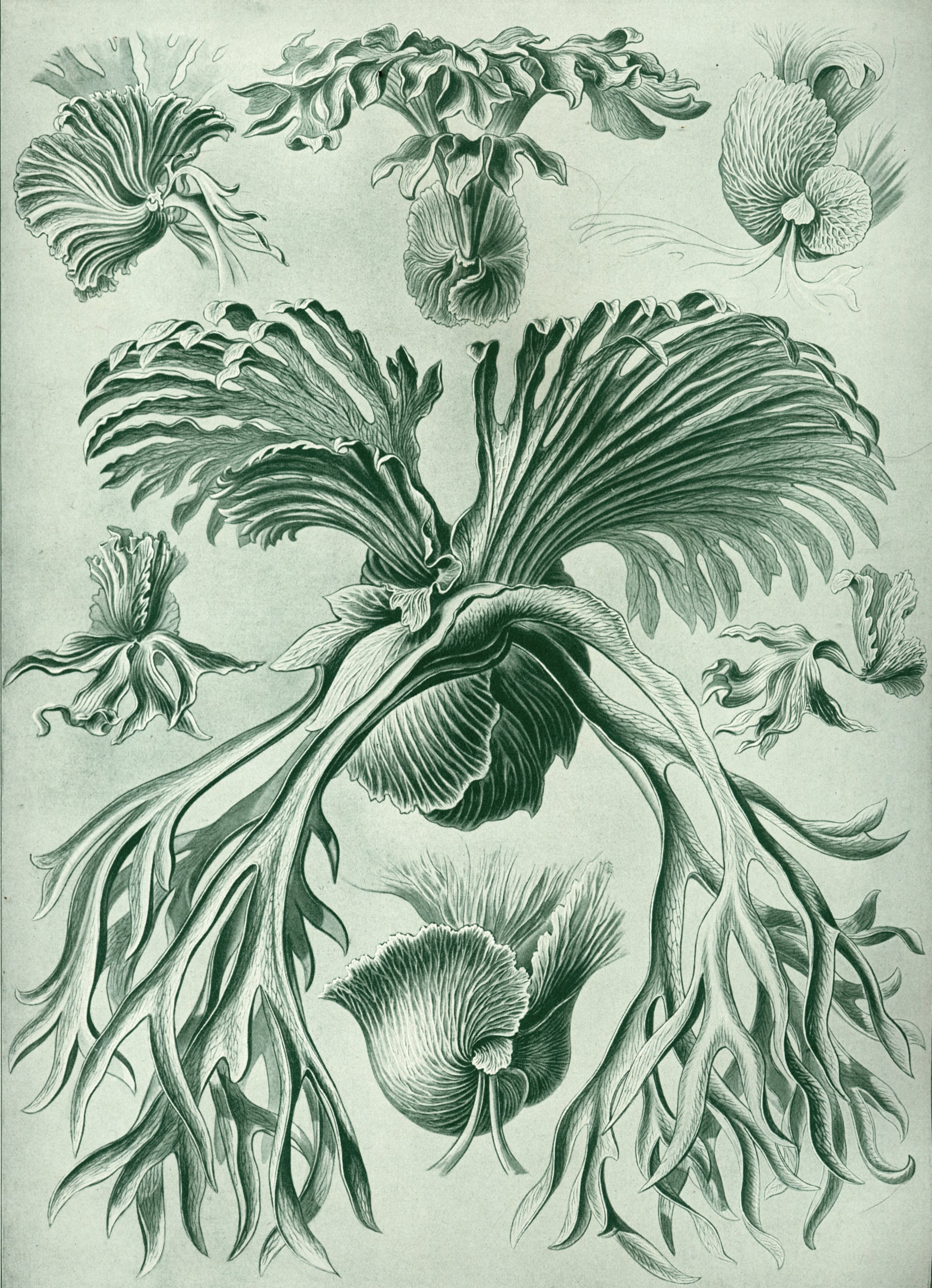
- Platycerium grande (center) depicted in Kunstformen der Natur (1904)

Scientific classification
- Kingdom: Plantae
- Clade: Tracheophytes
- Division: Polypodiophyta
- Class: Polypodiopsida
- Order: Polypodiales
- Suborder: Polypodiineae
- Family: Polypodiaceae
- Genus: Platycerium
- Species: P. grande

Binomial name
- Platycerium grande (Fée) Kunze (1850)

= Platycerium grande =

Species of fern

Platycerium grande, the giant staghorn fern, capa de leon (Spanish: lion's cape), and dapong repolyo (Filipino: air cabbage), is a species of epiphytic fern in the family Polypodiaceae. It is one of the two staghorn ferns native to the Philippines, along with P. coronarium, and is endemic to the island of Mindanao, in the provinces of Zamboanga, Lanao and Davao. P. grande is often collected from the forests and sold as a highly prized ornamental plant. Due to overcollection and the difficulty of the spores to germinate under natural conditions, in vitro technique is necessary to ensure mass production of this plant species. The local government categorized it as critically endangered species.

== Gallery ==
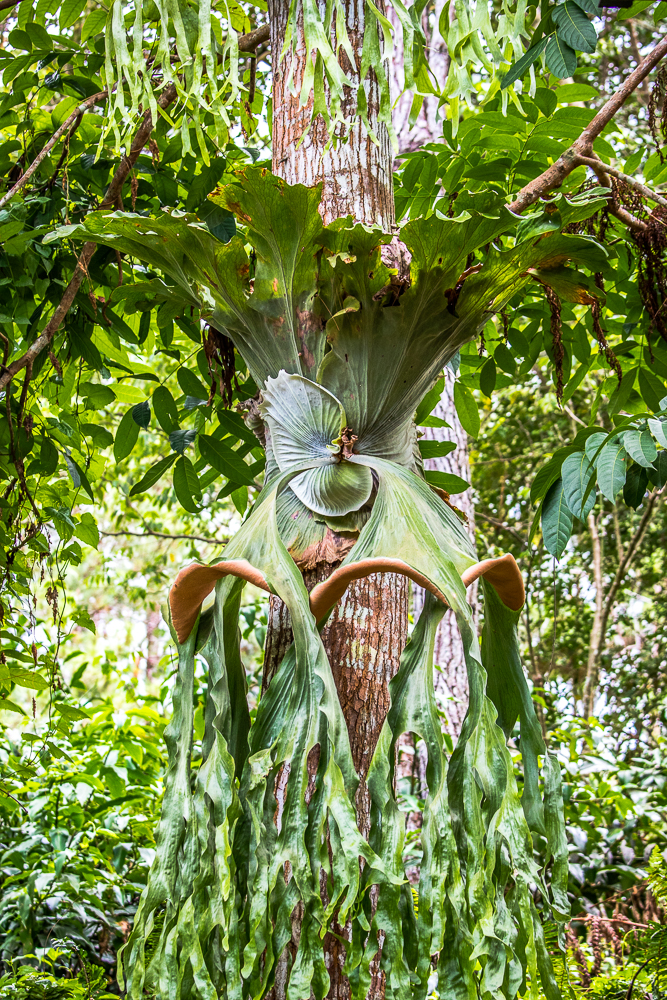
P. grande in cultivation

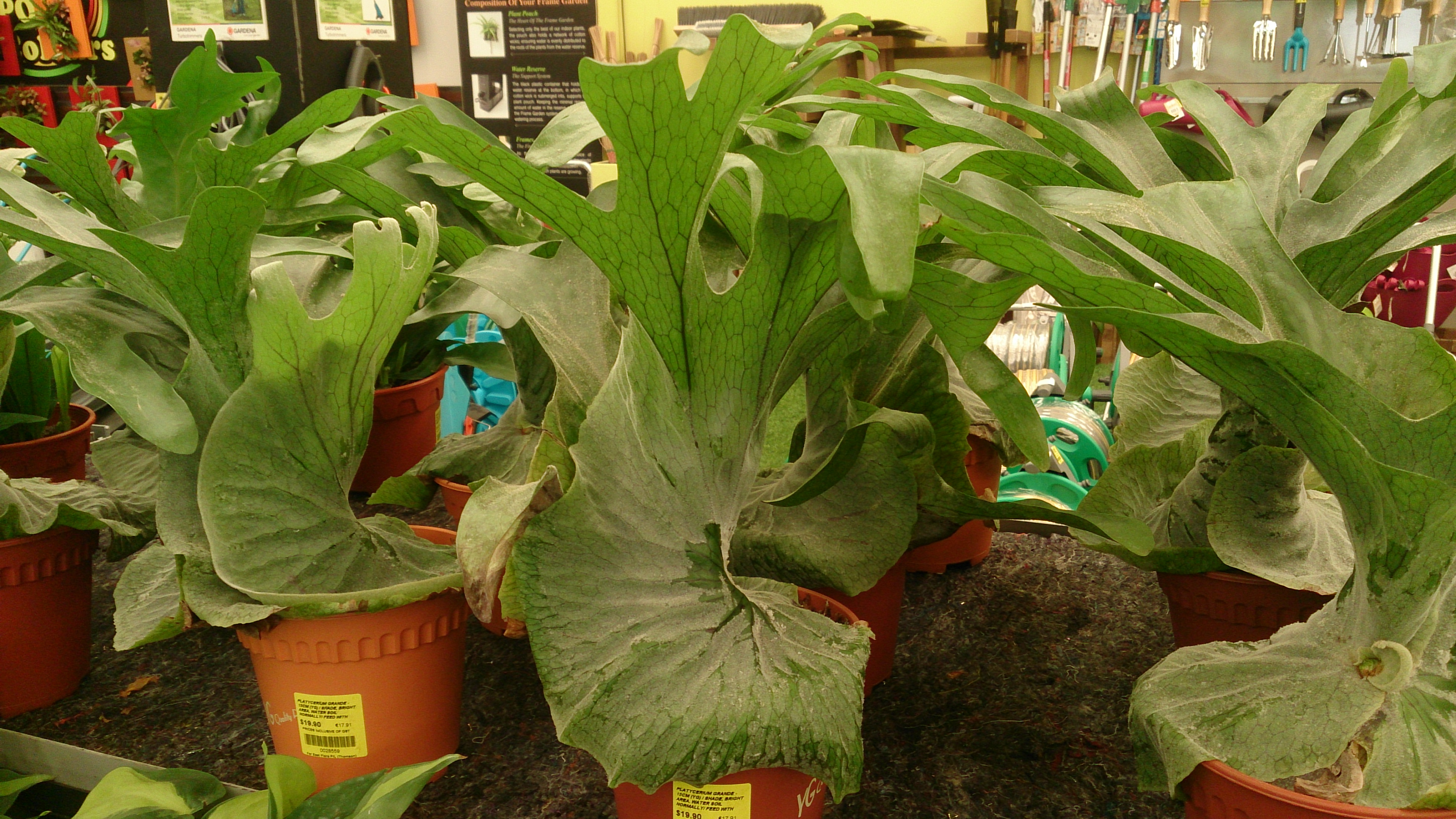
Nursery-grown seedlings of P. grande

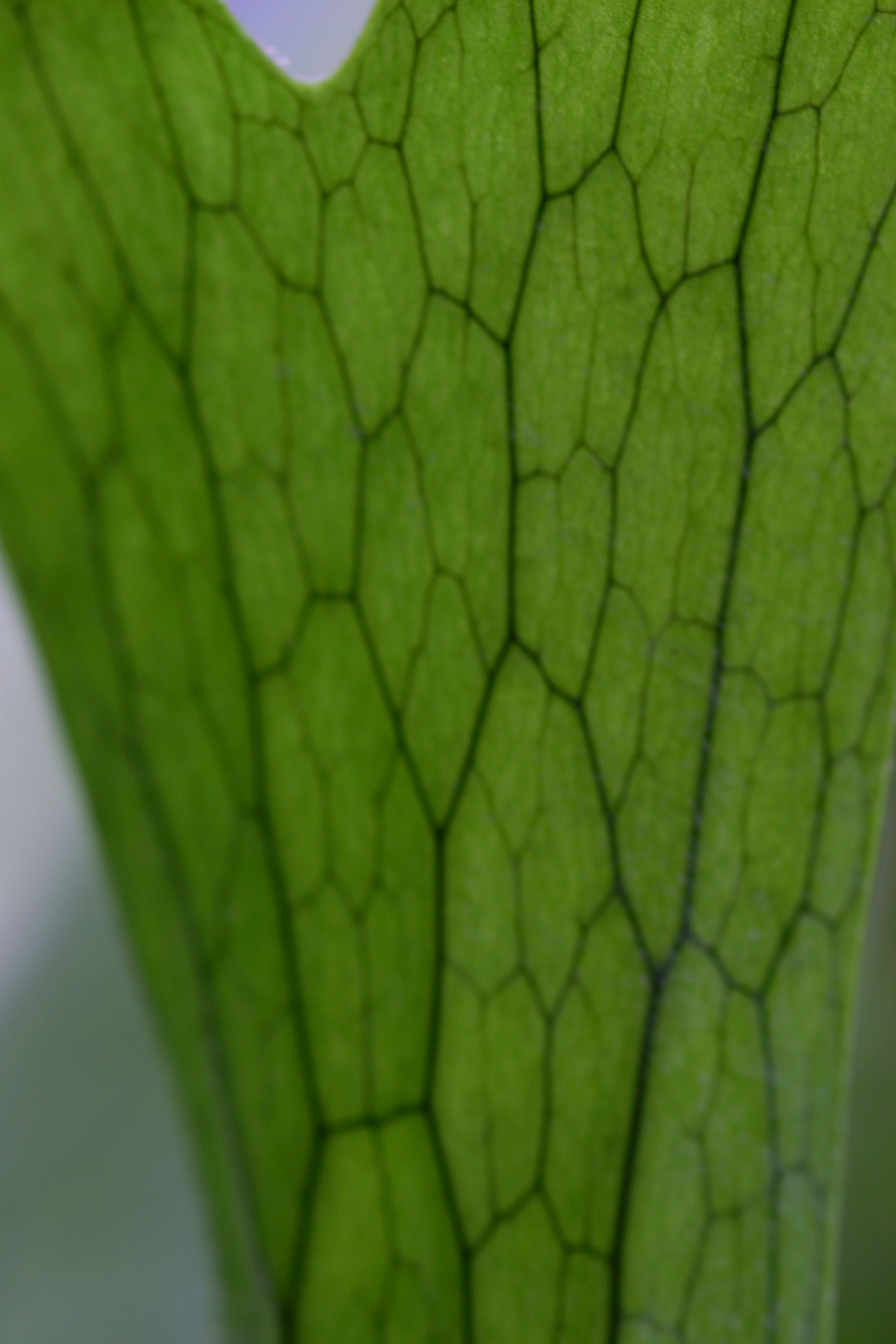
Close-up shot of P. grande frond
