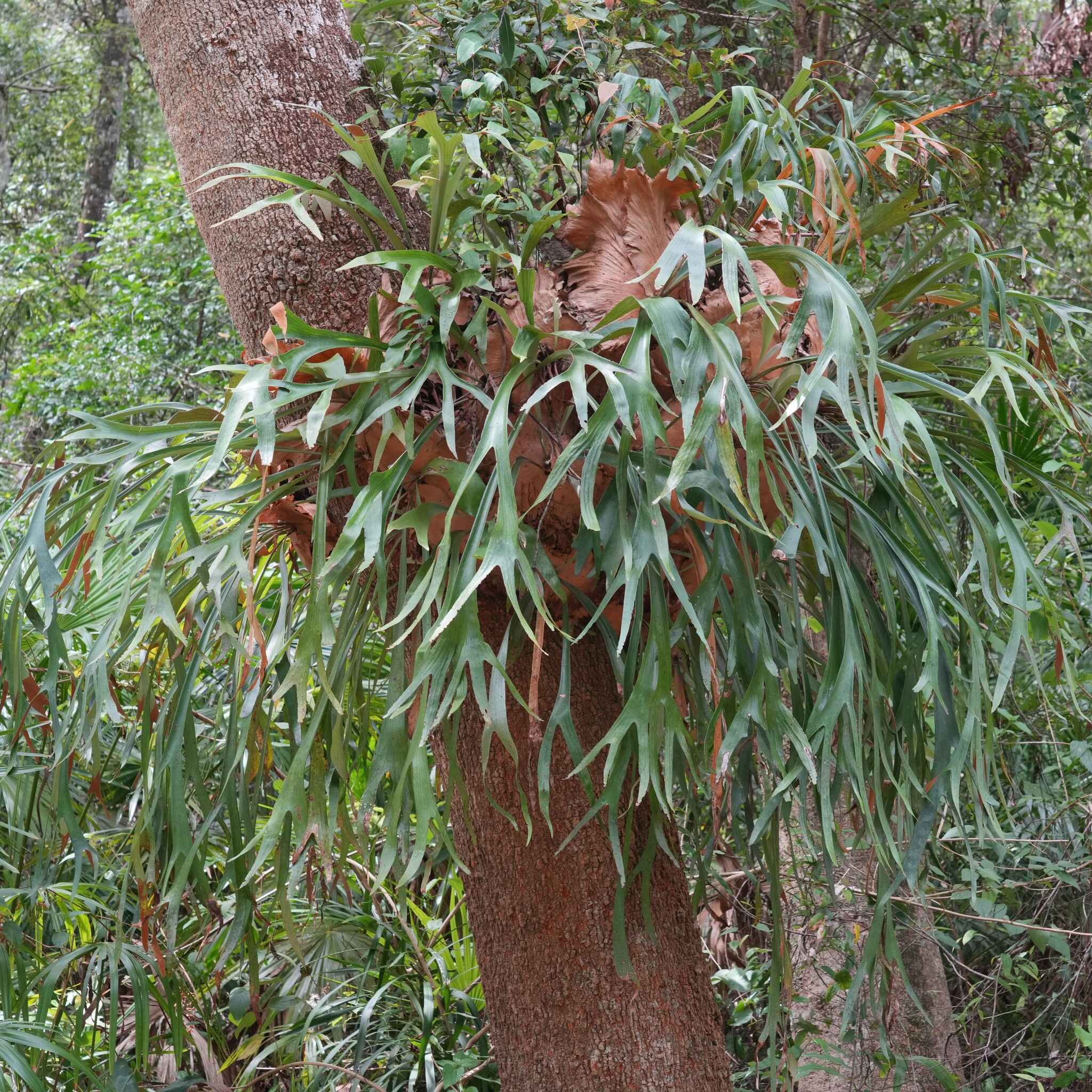
- Specimen growing in native forest near Port Macquarie, New South Wales

Conservation status
- Least Concern (NCA)

Scientific classification
- Kingdom: Plantae
- Clade: Tracheophytes
- Division: Polypodiophyta
- Class: Polypodiopsida
- Order: Polypodiales
- Suborder: Polypodiineae
- Family: Polypodiaceae
- Genus: Platycerium
- Species: P. bifurcatum

Binomial name
- Platycerium bifurcatum (Cav.) C.Chr.

Synonyms
- 10 synonyms: Alcicornium bifurcatum (Cav.) Underw.; Platycerium bifurcatum var. normale Domin; Acrostichum bifurcatum Cav.; Alcicornium vulgare Gaudich.; Platycerium alcicorne var. lanciferum F.M.Bailey; Platycerium alcicorne var. subrhomboideum F.M.Bailey; Platycerium angustatum Desv.; Platycerium bifurcatum subsp. bifurcatum; Platycerium bifurcatum var. lanciferum (F.M.Bailey) Domin; Platycerium bifurcatum var. subrhomboideum Domin

= Platycerium bifurcatum =

Species of fern

Platycerium bifurcatum, commonly known as elkhorn fern, is a species of epiphytic plant in the fern family Polypodiaceae. It is native to Australia and is widespread on the entire east coast.

== Description ==
Platycerium bifurcatum is an epiphytic fern with dimorphic fronds, usually found growing on tree trunks and branches. The rhizome is short-creeping and much-branched. It is covered by the shield-like nest fronds (also called basal fronds or sterile fronds), which are more or less rounded and overlapping, and are appressed to the host tree. They can grow to about 45 cm (18 in) diameter. Their upper margins are deeply lobed and spreading, such that they trap organic litter which later becomes a nutrient source for the plant.

The fertile fronds (also known as foliage fronds) are markedly different. They are semi-erect becoming pendant, up to 90 cm (35 in) long, very narrow at the base and gradually widening. They fork two or three times, with the final segments being up to 30 cm (12 in) long and 3 cm (1.2 in) wide. Spores are produced on the undersides of these final segments.

=== Growth habit ===
Elkhorn ferns form a colony, with new plantlets growing from buds on the lower margin of the nest fronds. Nest fronds die back after reaching maturity but remain with the colony, curling inwards and retaining whatever litter they have collected, while roots of the colony members grow into them. In this way, with nest leaves building up and new plantlets on the exterior, the colony can grow to huge sizes.

A study published in 2021 attempted to determine whether the individuals in these colonies specialise for different roles. The researchers found that the foliage fronds (called "strap fronds" in the study) of colony members near the bottom are less likely to produce spores than those of members near the top of the colony. They also found evidence that the nest fronds of lower members absorb more water than those of the members above them – in turn those higher members have more hydrophobic nest fronds that channel water to the lower members.

The researchers also found that colonies are mostly clonal, but occasionally include unrelated individuals. They concluded that their findings, collectively, may constitute the first evidence of eusociality in plants.

== Taxonomy ==
This plant was first described in 1799, as Acrostichum bifurcatum, by Spanish botanist Antonio José Cavanilles. It was given its current binomial name by Danish botanist Carl Christensen in 1906.

In a 1972 study, botanist Barbara Joe Hoshizaki published a phylogenic review of Platycerium in which the known species were ordered into three groups. The Afro-American and the Malayan-Asiatic groups both contained seven species, and the Javan-Australian group four. The latter group consisted of P. bifurcatum, P. hillii, P. veitchii and P. willinckii. In 1982, Elbert Hennipman and Marco C. Roos published a book in which they recognised only P. bifurcatum of this group, and reduced the other three to subspecies of it. This move was criticised by Hoshizaki in 1990 and later by Hans-Peter Kreier and Harald Schneider in 2006. As of August 2026, only the Global Biodiversity Information Facility and World Flora Online accept some (not all) subspecies. No subspecies are recognised by the Australian National Herbarium, Plants of the World Online, or World Ferns.

=== Etymology ===
The genus name Platycerium comes from the Greek platys (flat), and ceras (horn), while the specific epithet bifurcatum means forked. Both names are referring to the morphology of the fertile fronds.

=== Common name ===
It is commonly known as elkhorn fern.

== Distribution and habitat ==
This species is native to eastern Australia, from southern New South Wales to northern Queensland, including Lord Howe Island. In the southern areas it grows on trees and boulders in a variety of forest types, including swamp forest and open forest, while in north Queensland it grows mainly on trees in montane rainforest.

It has been introduced to many countries, including the Canary Islands, Colombia, Hawaii, KwaZulu-Natal, New Zealand and Taiwan. The map at the Global Biodiversity Information Facility website shows occurrences in North and South America, Europe, south eastern Africa and throughout the Asia-Pacific region.

== Conservation status ==
This species has been assessed to be of least concern by the Queensland Government under its Nature Conservation Act.. It is not listed on either of the New South Wales or Australian Governments' threatened species lists, nor has it been assessed by the International Union for Conservation of Nature.

== Cultivation ==
Platycerium bifurcatum is commonly cultivated around the world as an ornamental plant. They are easily propagated by division and can be mounted on trees or boards, or grown in baskets. With a minimum temperature requirement of 5 °C (41 °F), in temperate regions it may be grown outdoors in sheltered locations, otherwise as a houseplant. It has gained the Royal Horticultural Society's Award of Garden Merit.

== Gallery ==
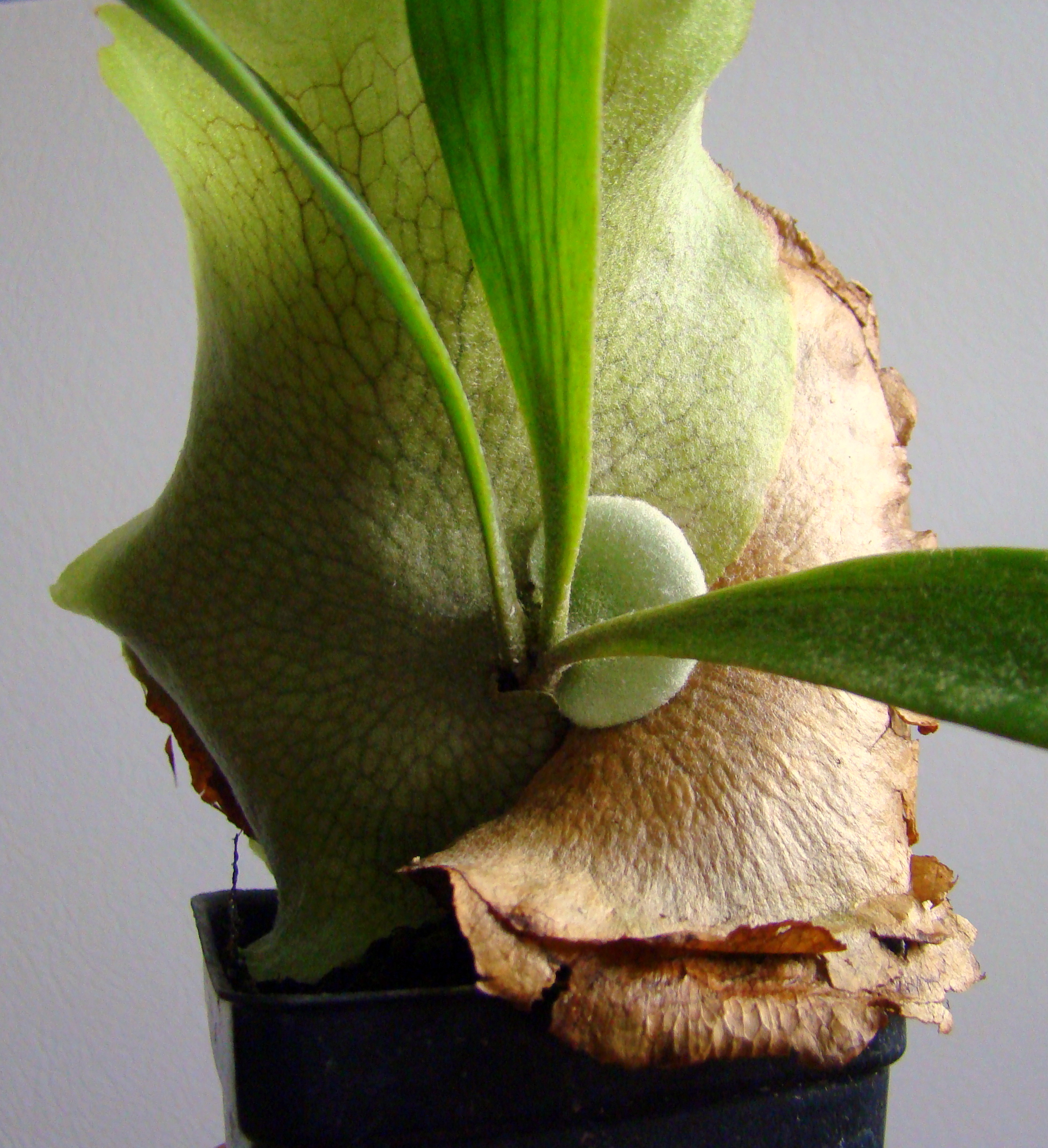
An individual plant

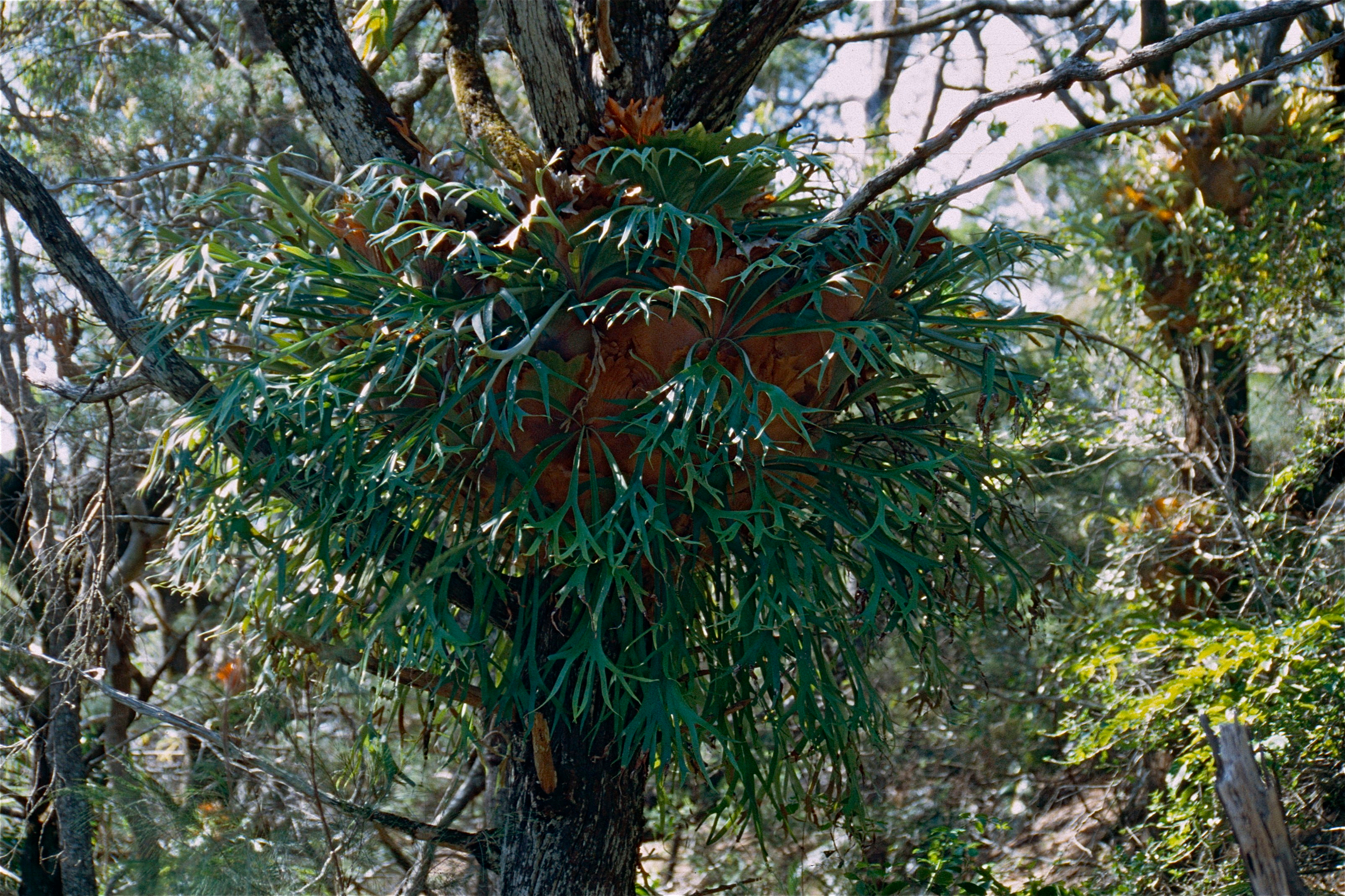
A large colony on K'gari (Fraser Island), Queensland

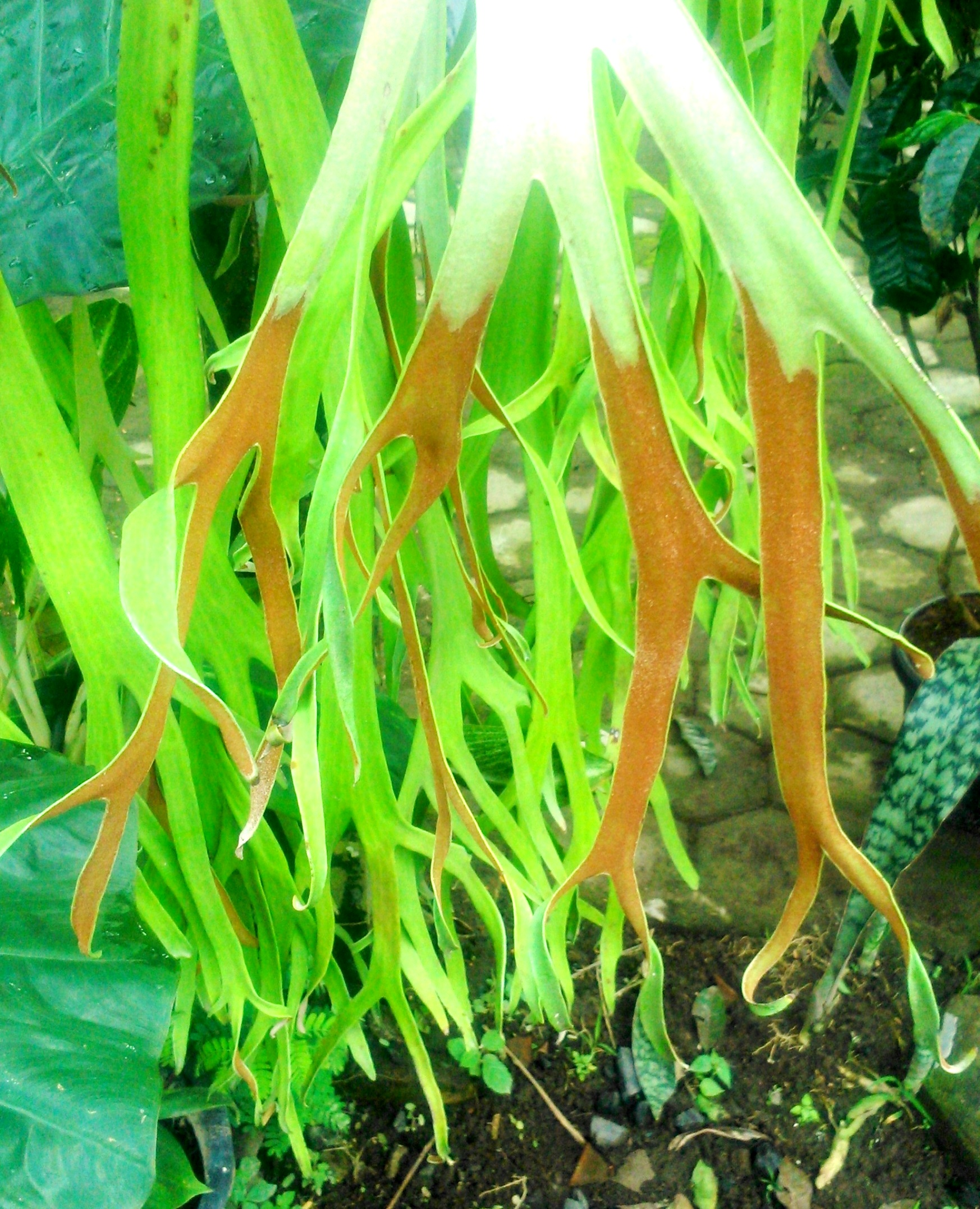
Detail of fertile frond

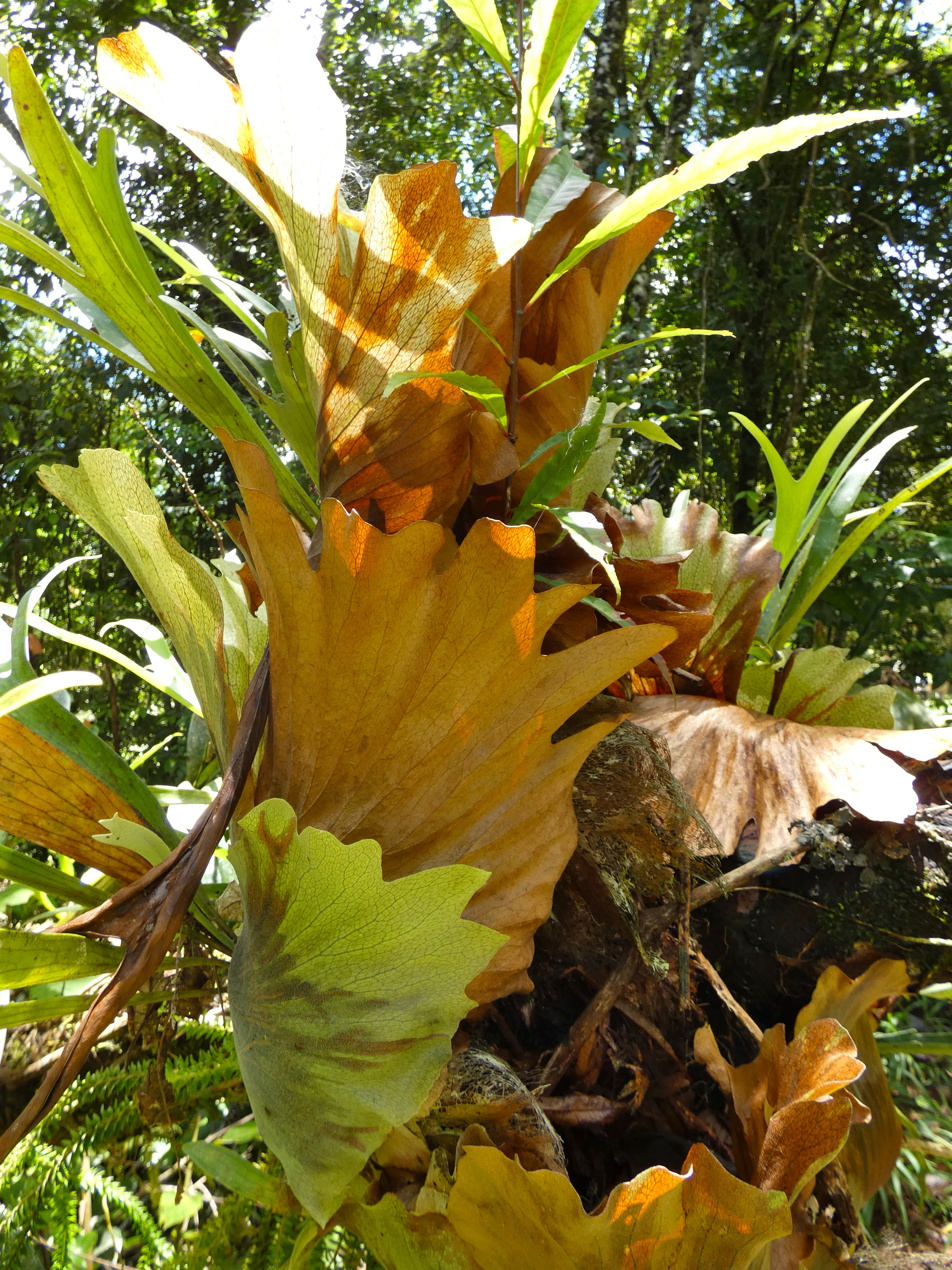
Lobed nest fronds
