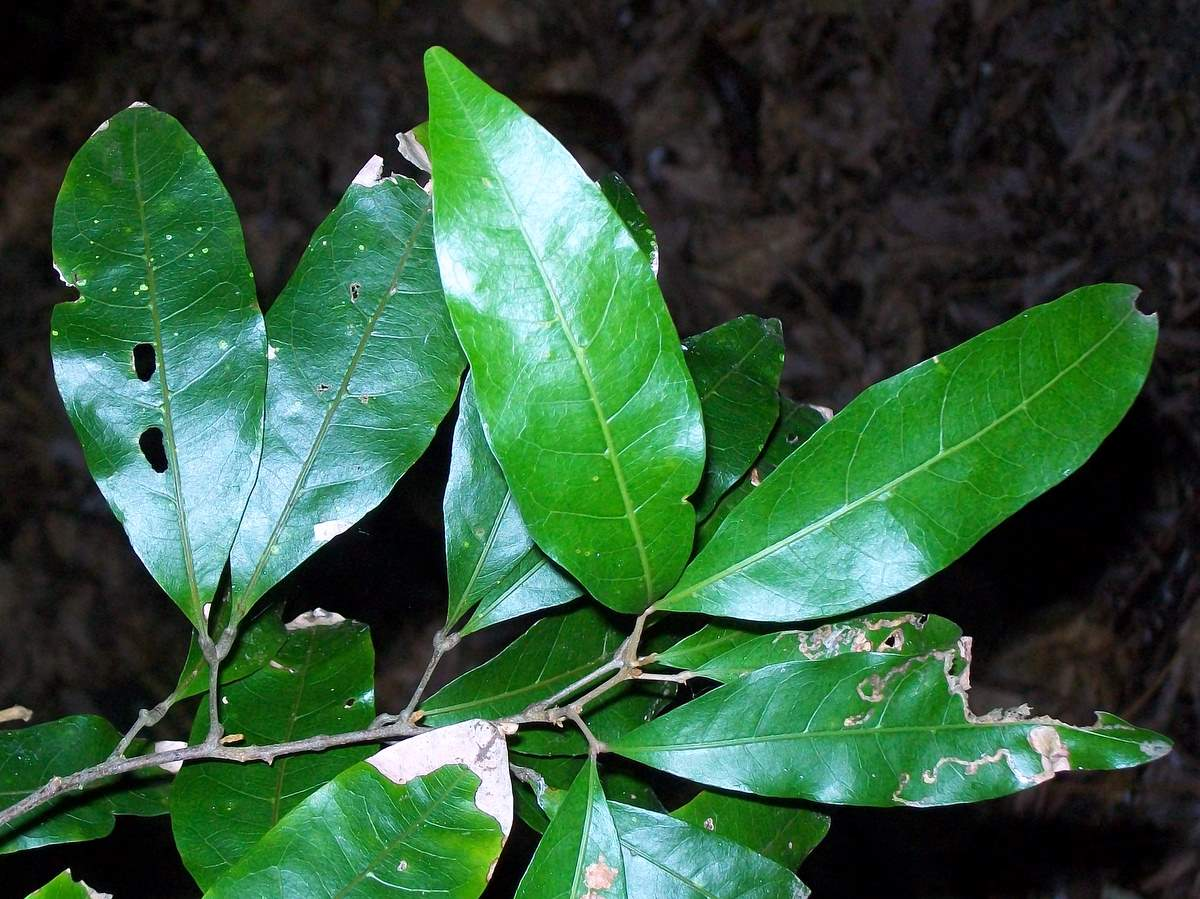

Scientific classification
- Kingdom: Plantae
- Clade: Tracheophytes
- Clade: Angiosperms
- Clade: Eudicots
- Clade: Rosids
- Order: Sapindales
- Family: Sapindaceae
- Genus: Arytera
- Species: A. distylis

Binomial name
- Arytera distylis (F.Muell. ex Benth.) Radlk.

Synonyms
- Nephelium distylis (Benth.) F.Muell.; Ratonia distylis Benth.

= Arytera distylis =

Two-leaved coogera

Species of tree

Arytera distylis, known as the two-leaved coogera or twin-leaved coogera is a rainforest tree of eastern Australia. It grows by streams or in seaside rainforests. It occurs from the Orara River in the Mid North Coast region of New South Wales, extending up to Maryborough in southeast Queensland.

The twin leaf foliage makes identification of this plant fairly straightforward. The generic name Arytera is from the Ancient Greek for 'cup', referring to the cup-shaped fruit valves. The specific epithet distylis is from Latin and refers to the two styles in the flower.

== Description ==
A small tree with a dense, pale green crown, occasionally reaching a height of over 20 metres (60 ft) tall, and a stem diameter of 35 cm (14 in). The base of the tree is flanged or buttressed. The trunk shape is irregular with smooth greyish bark. Young shoots on the small branches are noticeably hairy.

=== Leaves ===
The leaves are pinnate and alternate, of one to four un-toothed leaflets; however, they are usually of two leaflets, hence the common name. Leaflet shape varies, being ovate-oblong, lanceolate or elliptical. The leaf tip can be notched or fairly blunt. Leaflets are 4 to 8 cm long and 1.5 to 3.5 cm wide. The leaflet stalk is dark and can be up to 6 mm long. The main leaf stalk is from 9 to 18 mm long. Leaf veins are noticeable on both sides. Three to six hairless domatia form where the lateral veins meet the leaf's midrib.

=== Flowers, fruit and regeneration ===
Small flowers form between September and October, being cream in colour, on small, hairy panicles. Occasionally, the female flower forms on a raceme.

The fruit is an orange-yellow dry capsule, 9 to 13 mm long, maturing from October to February. Inside the capsule are one to three hairy lobes, with one seed per lobe. Seeds are relatively large, 9 mm long, partially covered in an orange or red aril. Seeds are eaten by rainforest birds, including the figbird and regent bowerbird. Fresh seed is recommended for planting. Germination occurs between three and eight weeks.
