= Arytera littoralis =

Conservation status
- Least Concern (IUCN 3.1)

Scientific classification
- Kingdom: Plantae
- Clade: Tracheophytes
- Clade: Angiosperms
- Clade: Eudicots
- Clade: Rosids
- Order: Sapindales
- Family: Sapindaceae
- Genus: Arytera
- Species: A. littoralis

Binomial name
- Arytera littoralis Bl.

Species of flowering plant

Arytera littoralis is a species of plant in the family Sapindaceae. It native to China and Southeast Asia.
