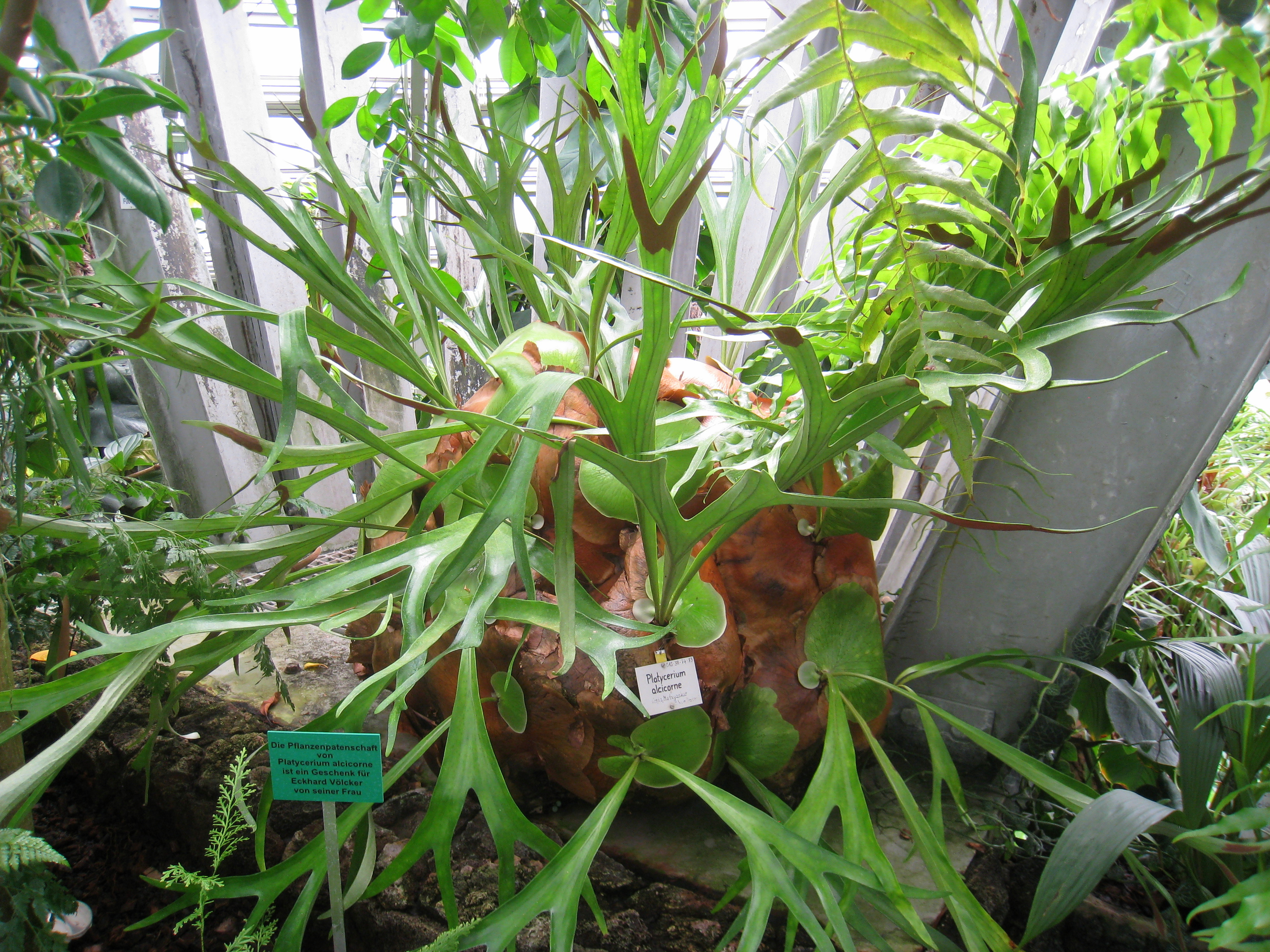

Scientific classification
- Kingdom: Plantae
- Clade: Embryophytes
- Clade: Tracheophytes
- Division: Polypodiophyta
- Class: Polypodiopsida
- Order: Polypodiales
- Suborder: Polypodiineae
- Family: Polypodiaceae
- Genus: Platycerium
- Species: P. alcicorne

Binomial name
- Platycerium alcicorne Desv.

= Platycerium alcicorne =

Species of fern

Platycerium alcicorne is a species of staghorn fern (Platycerium) native to Madagascar, the Seychelles and Comoros Islands, as well as Mozambique and Zimbabwe.

It is cultivated as an ornamental plant for gardens.
