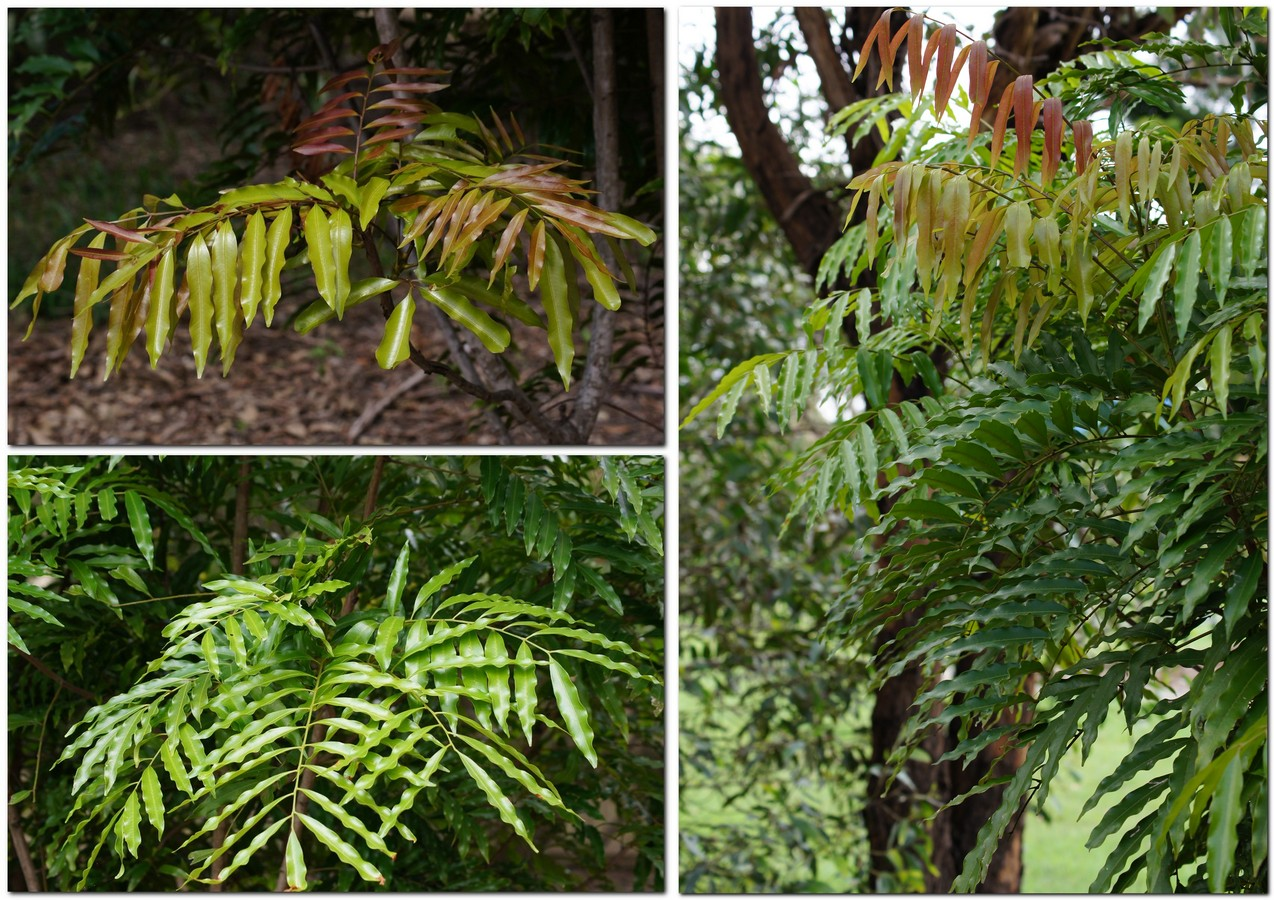
- Mischarytera lautereriana, Corduroy or Rose Tamarind, by Tatiana Gerus, 19 January 2011, planted young specimen tree, Brisbane
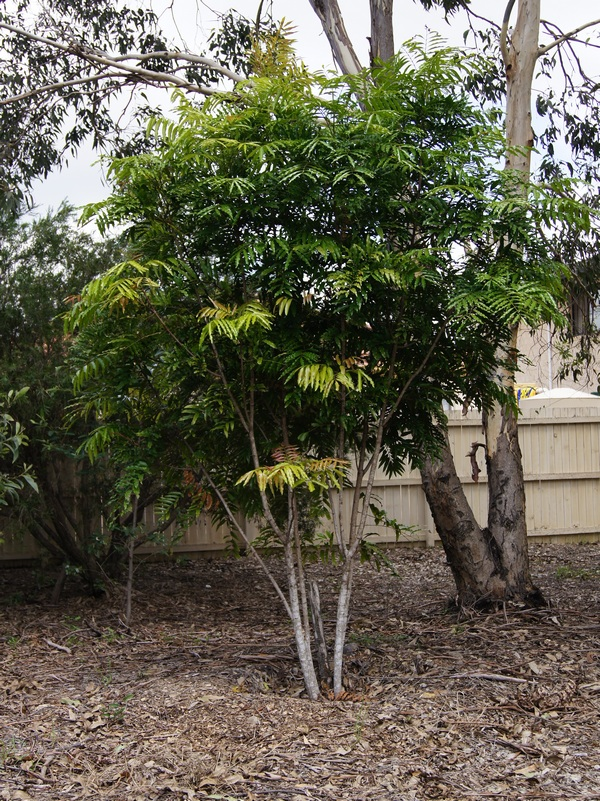

Scientific classification
- Kingdom: Plantae
- Clade: Tracheophytes
- Clade: Angiosperms
- Clade: Eudicots
- Clade: Rosids
- Order: Sapindales
- Family: Sapindaceae
- Tribe: Cupanieae
- Genus: Mischarytera (Radlk.) H.Turner

Species
- See text

= Mischarytera =

Genus of plants

Mischarytera is a genus of rainforest trees, constituting part of the plant family Sapindaceae. Four species are known to science as of December 2013, found growing naturally in eastern Queensland, Australia, and in New Guinea. Formerly until 1995, they had names within the genus Arytera, subgenus Mischarytera.

In 2006 botanist Paul I. Forster formally scientifically described Mischarytera megaphylla P.I.Forst. based on specimens collected from trees of a restricted area (endemic) of the lowland Daintree Rainforest region, part of the larger Wet Tropics region of north-eastern Queensland, Australia. Before the formal description these trees were known and informally described as Mischarytera sp. Oliver Creek (L.J.Webb+ 10903) Qld Herbarium and Sapindaceae sp. (Noah Creek BG 6026).

== Species ==
- Mischarytera bullata (H.Turner) H.Turner – New Guinea endemic

– synonym: base name: Arytera bullata H.Turner

- Mischarytera lautereriana (F.M.Bailey) H.Turner; Corduroy Tamarind – NE. to SE. Qld endemic

– synonyms: base name: Nephelium lautererianum F.M.Bailey; nomenclatural: Arytera lautereriana (F.M.Bailey) Radlk.

- Mischarytera macrobotrys (Merr. & L.M.Perry) H.Turner – Cape York Peninsula, Qld and New Guinea

– synonyms: base name: Mischocarpus macrobotrys Merr. & L.M.Perry; nomenclatural: Arytera macrobotrys (Merr. & L.M.Perry) R.W.Ham

- Mischarytera megaphylla P.I.Forst. – NE. Qld endemic

– synonyms: Mischarytera sp. Oliver Creek (L.J.Webb + 10903) Qld Herbarium; Sapindaceae sp. (Noah Creek BG 6026)
