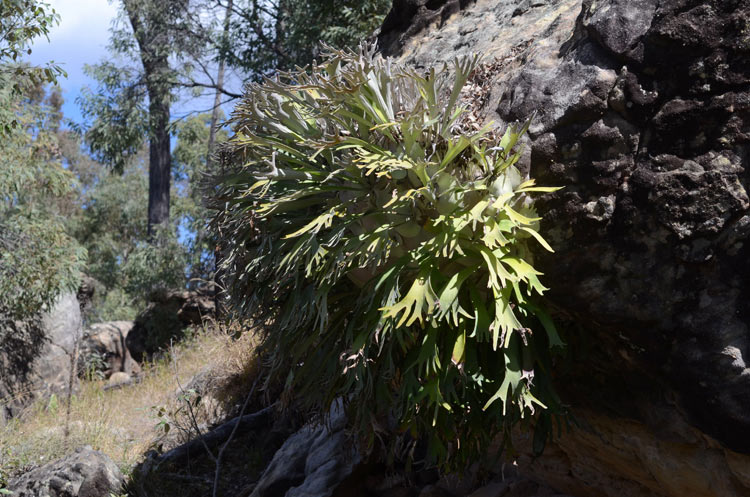

Scientific classification
- Kingdom: Plantae
- Clade: Tracheophytes
- Division: Polypodiophyta
- Class: Polypodiopsida
- Order: Polypodiales
- Suborder: Polypodiineae
- Family: Polypodiaceae
- Genus: Platycerium
- Species: P. veitchii

Binomial name
- Platycerium veitchii (Underw.) C.Chr.

Synonyms
- Alcicornium veitchii Underw.; Platycerium bifurcatum subsp. veitchii (Underw.) Hennipman & M.C.Roos

= Platycerium veitchii =

Species of fern

Platycerium veitchii, called the silver elkhorn fern or the silver staghorn fern, is a species of fern in the family Polypodiaceae, native to Queensland. It has gained the Royal Horticultural Society's Award of Garden Merit as an ornamental.
