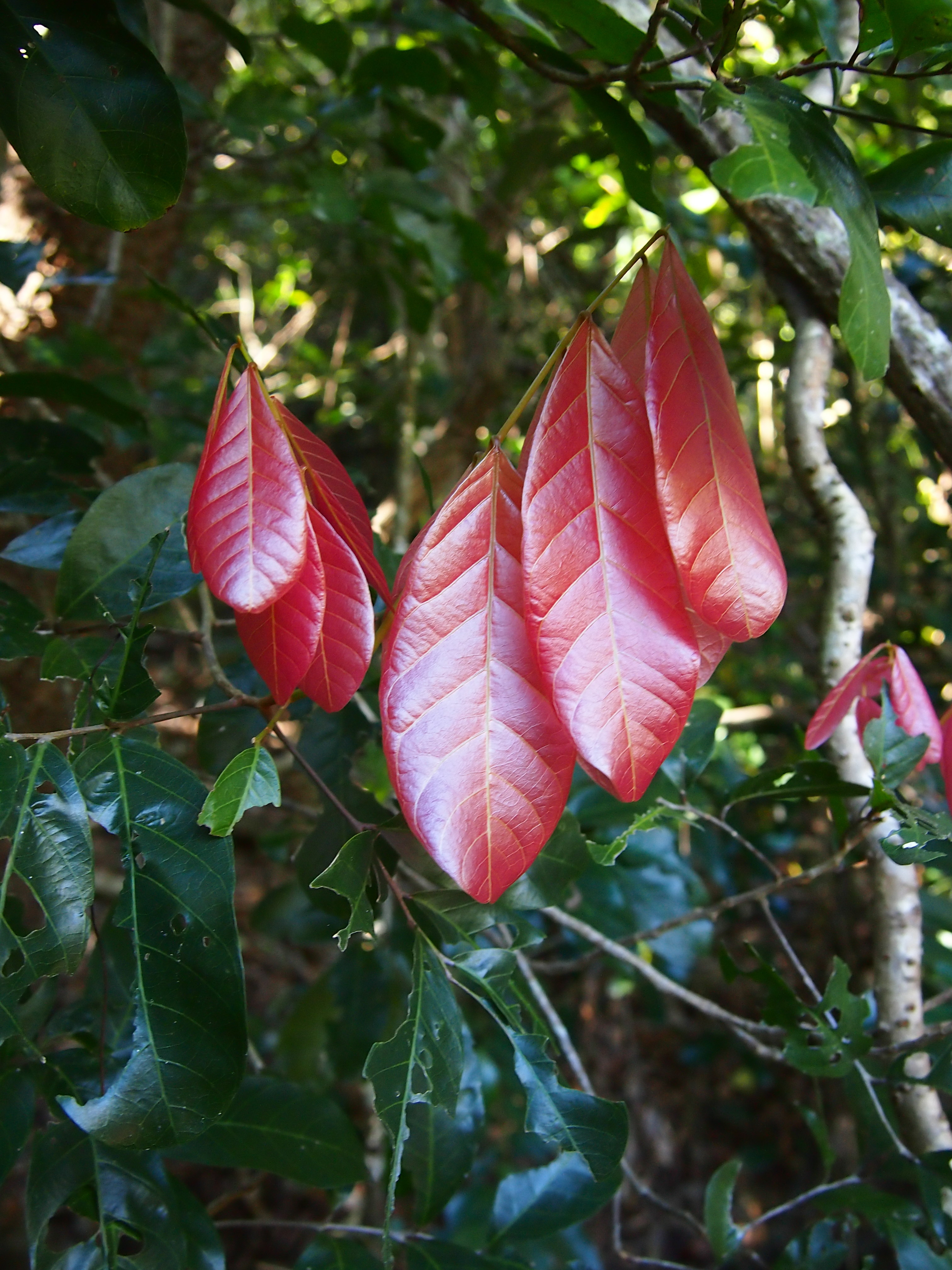
- At the Royal Botanic Gardens, Sydney

Scientific classification
- Kingdom: Plantae
- Clade: Tracheophytes
- Clade: Angiosperms
- Clade: Eudicots
- Clade: Rosids
- Order: Sapindales
- Family: Sapindaceae
- Genus: Arytera
- Species: A. divaricata

Binomial name
- Arytera divaricata F.Muell.

Synonyms
- Nephelium divaricatum (F.Muell.) Benth.

= Arytera divaricata =

Rose tamarind

Species of tree

Arytera divaricata, known as the gap axe, coogara, coogera or rose tamarind is a forest tree of eastern Australia. An attractive plant with glossy pale and limp new leaves. It grows in fairly dry situations, often in littoral rainforests and monsoon forest.

The southernmost limit of natural distribution is Port Stephens (32° S) in New South Wales, extending north to Cape York at the northernmost tip of Australia. The generic name Arytera is from the Greek for 'cup', referring to the cup-shaped fruit valves. The specific epithet divaricata is from Latin and refers to the wide-spreading branchlets of the flower panicle.

== Description ==
A small to large tree with dark mature leaves, reaching a height of over 35 metres, though usually seen less than ten metres tall. The base of the tree is somewhat flanged. The bark is thin, smooth and greyish.

The leaves are pinnate and alternate, of two to six pairs of leaflets. Leaf shape is lanceolate to ovate, not toothed. Leaflets are 5 to 15 cm long, 1.5 to 6 cm wide, hairy and leathery, and usually not with a sharp point. They are shiny green above. New foliage is red, pink then yellow. The leaf stem is 3 to 6 mm long. The midrib is raised above and below. Leaves are distinctly veined, with 8 to 12 main lateral leaf veins.

Flowers form between November and April, being cream in colour, on wide and hairy panicles. The fruit is a capsule with three lobes. Brown oval-shaped seeds are enclosed in a red fleshy aril. The seeds mature from June to October. Seed germination is reliable, often taking only seven days for roots to show.

== Uses ==
Arytera divaricata may serve as a decorative and ornamental tree.
