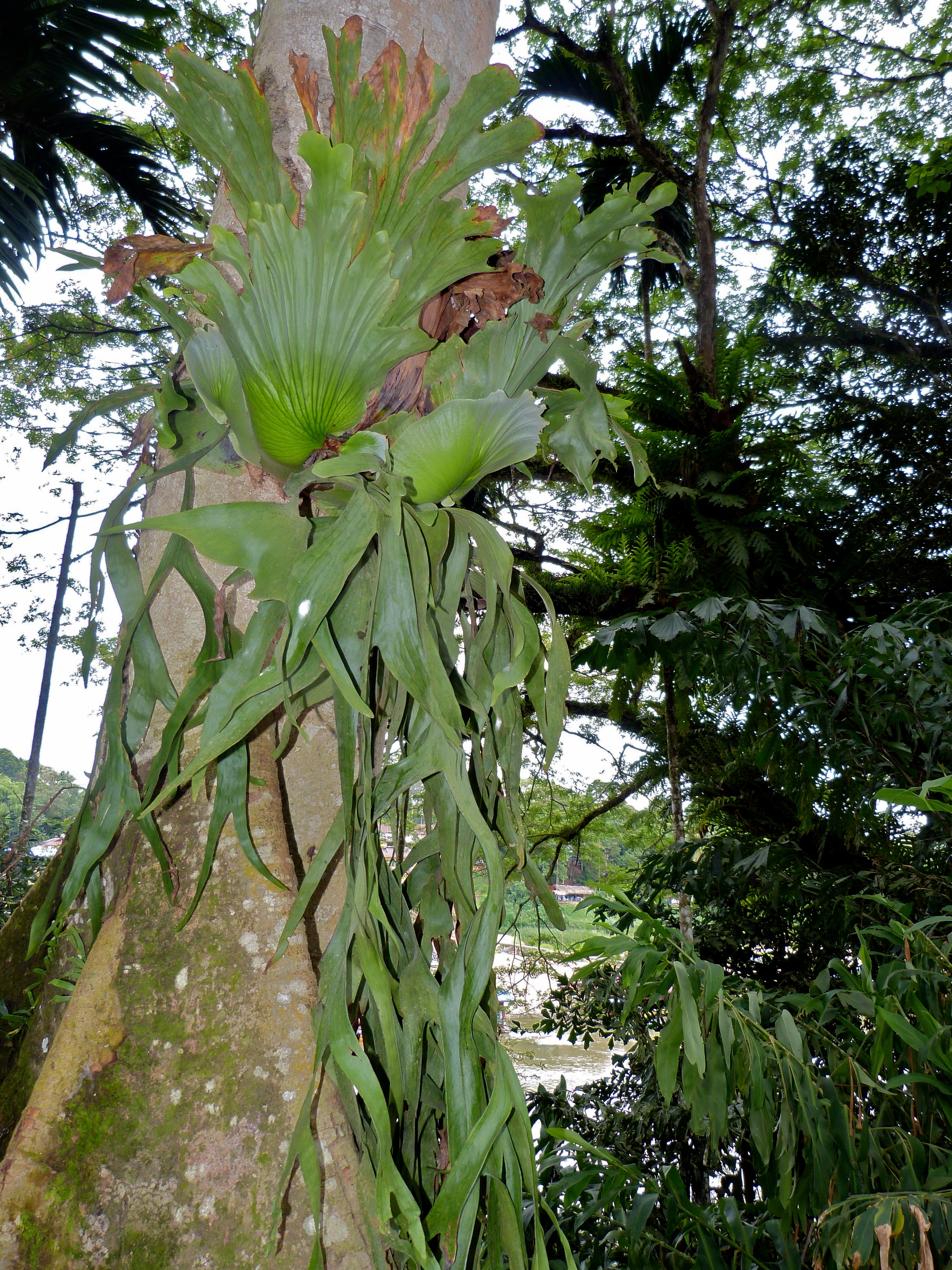
- A large specimen of Platycerium coronarium from Pahang, Malaysia. This plant exhibits both foliage and spore-bearing leaves.

Scientific classification
- Kingdom: Plantae
- Clade: Tracheophytes
- Division: Polypodiophyta
- Class: Polypodiopsida
- Order: Polypodiales
- Suborder: Polypodiineae
- Family: Polypodiaceae
- Genus: Platycerium
- Species: P. coronarium

Binomial name
- Platycerium coronarium (O.F.Müll.) Desv.

= Platycerium coronarium =

Species of fern

Platycerium coronarium is an epiphytic species of staghorn fern in the genus Platycerium. It is found in maritime Southeast Asia and Indochina. and throughout the East Indies. It produces two kinds of leaves: Foliage leaves which are broad and upright in habit, and spore bearing leaves which are narrow, pendulous, dichotomously lobed and up to fifteen feet (4.6 meters) in length.
