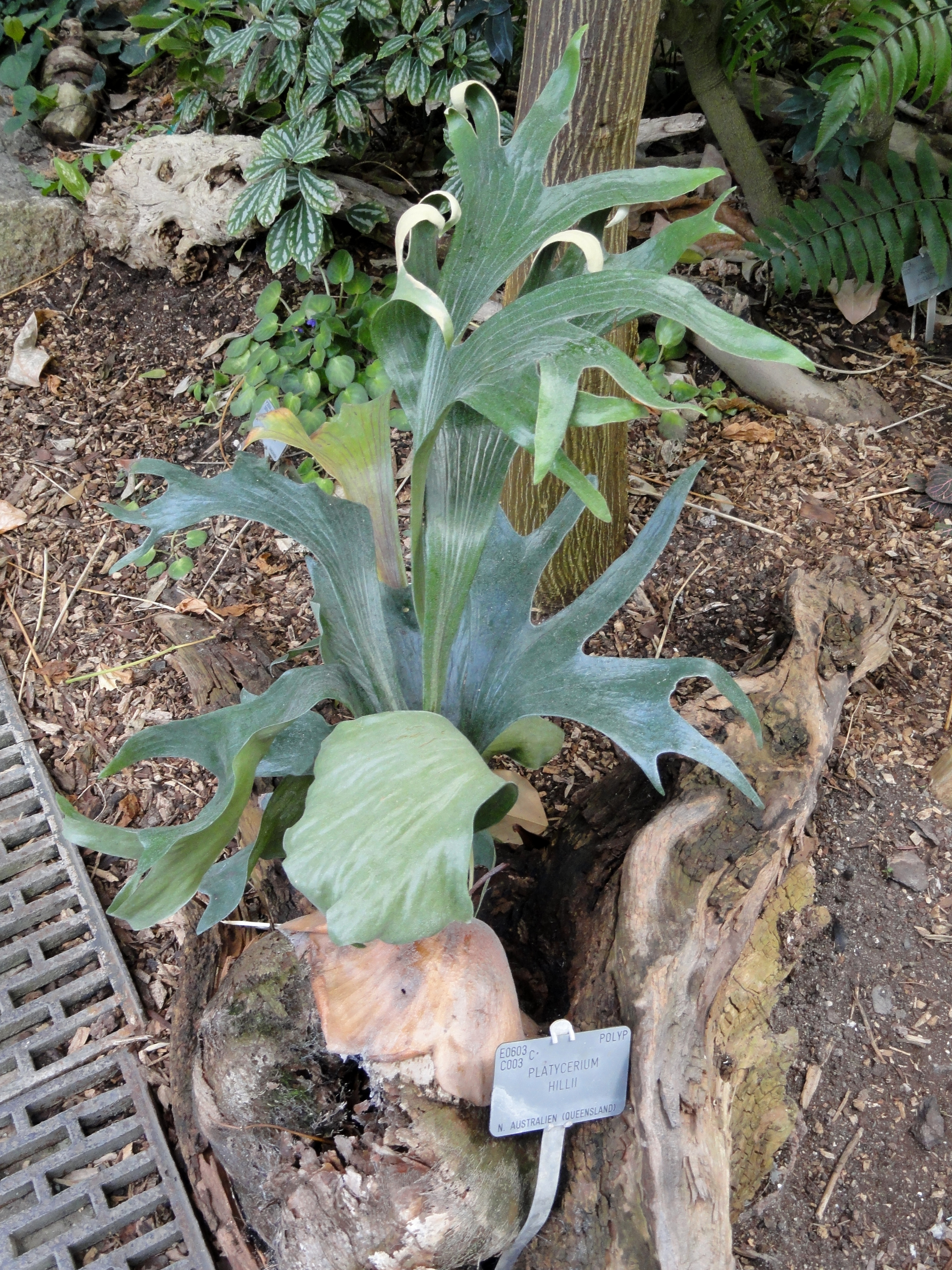

Scientific classification
- Kingdom: Plantae
- Clade: Tracheophytes
- Division: Polypodiophyta
- Class: Polypodiopsida
- Order: Polypodiales
- Suborder: Polypodiineae
- Family: Polypodiaceae
- Genus: Platycerium
- Species: P. hillii

Binomial name
- Platycerium hillii T.Moore

Synonyms
- Homotypic Synonyms: Platycerium alcicorne var. hillii (T.Moore) F.M.Bailey in Syn. Queensl. Fl.: 724 (1883); Platycerium bifurcatum var. hillii (T.Moore) Domin; Heterotypic Synonyms: Alcicornium hillii Underw.

= Platycerium hillii =

Species of fern

Platycerium hillii is a species of staghorn fern in the family Polypodiaceae. It is found in Australia.
