= Mischarytera macrobotrys =

Conservation status
- Least Concern (IUCN 2.3)

Scientific classification
- Kingdom: Plantae
- Clade: Tracheophytes
- Clade: Angiosperms
- Clade: Eudicots
- Clade: Rosids
- Order: Sapindales
- Family: Sapindaceae
- Genus: Mischarytera
- Species: M. macrobotrys

Binomial name
- Mischarytera macrobotrys (Merr. & L.M.Perry) H.Turner

Synonyms
- Arytera macrobotrys (Merr. & L.M.Perry) R.W.Ham

Species of tree

Mischarytera macrobotrys is a species of rainforest trees, of the flowering plant family Sapindaceae. They grow naturally in Cape York Peninsula, Queensland, Australia and Papua New Guinea.
