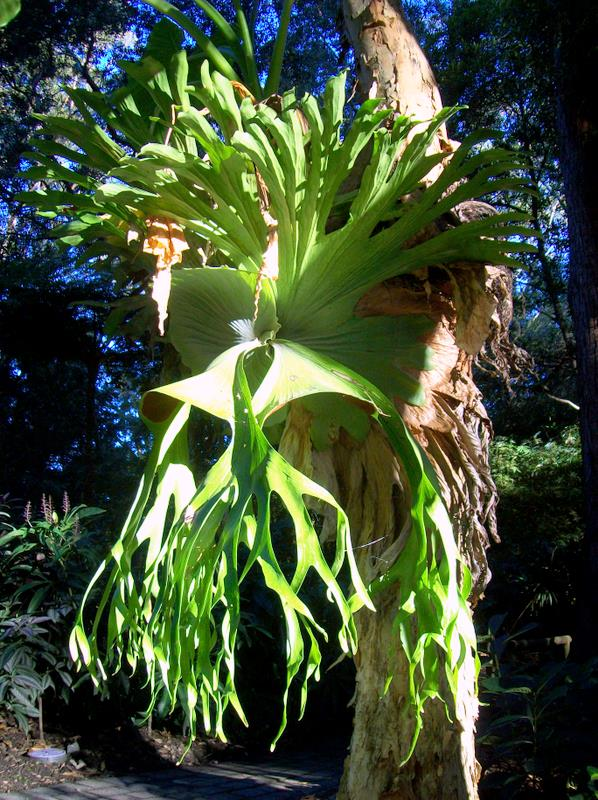
- Staghorn fern at North Coast Regional Botanic Garden, Australia

Scientific classification
- Kingdom: Plantae
- Clade: Tracheophytes
- Division: Polypodiophyta
- Class: Polypodiopsida
- Order: Polypodiales
- Suborder: Polypodiineae
- Family: Polypodiaceae
- Genus: Platycerium
- Species: P. superbum

Binomial name
- Platycerium superbum de Jonch. & Hennipman

= Platycerium superbum =

Species of fern

Platycerium superbum, commonly known as the staghorn fern, is a Platycerium species of fern. It is native to Australia.

== Distribution ==
The fern is native to north-east New South Wales (north of Nabiac) and Queensland. It can also be found in parts of Indonesia, Malaysia and New Guinea. In propagated form, the plant is grown successfully as far south as Victoria.

During the 1990s, the fern was also discovered on the Hawaiian Islands where they are now considered a "problem species".

== Features ==
Platycerium superbum is a bracket epiphyte naturally occurring in and near rainforests but is now also widely cultivated as an ornamental plant for gardens.

In both naturally occurring and propagated forms, these ferns develop a humus-collecting "nest" of non-fertile fronds and in doing so can grow up to 1 metre wide. The ferns also develop hanging fertile fronds that can reach up to 2 metres long.

Both fertile and non-fertile fronds are broad and branching and grown to resemble the horns of a stag or elk, thus the common names stag horn or elk horn.

The plant gives off many tiny spores that drift to nearby trees to reproduce.

== Nutrition ==
In the wild, the nest structure captures falling leaves and other detritus which then decomposes to provide the plant with nutrients. The ferns are known to favour a slightly acidic environment and so to encourage growth in propagated plants, some growers recommend adding used tea leaves directly to the plant's "nest". Others recommend doing the same with banana peel.
