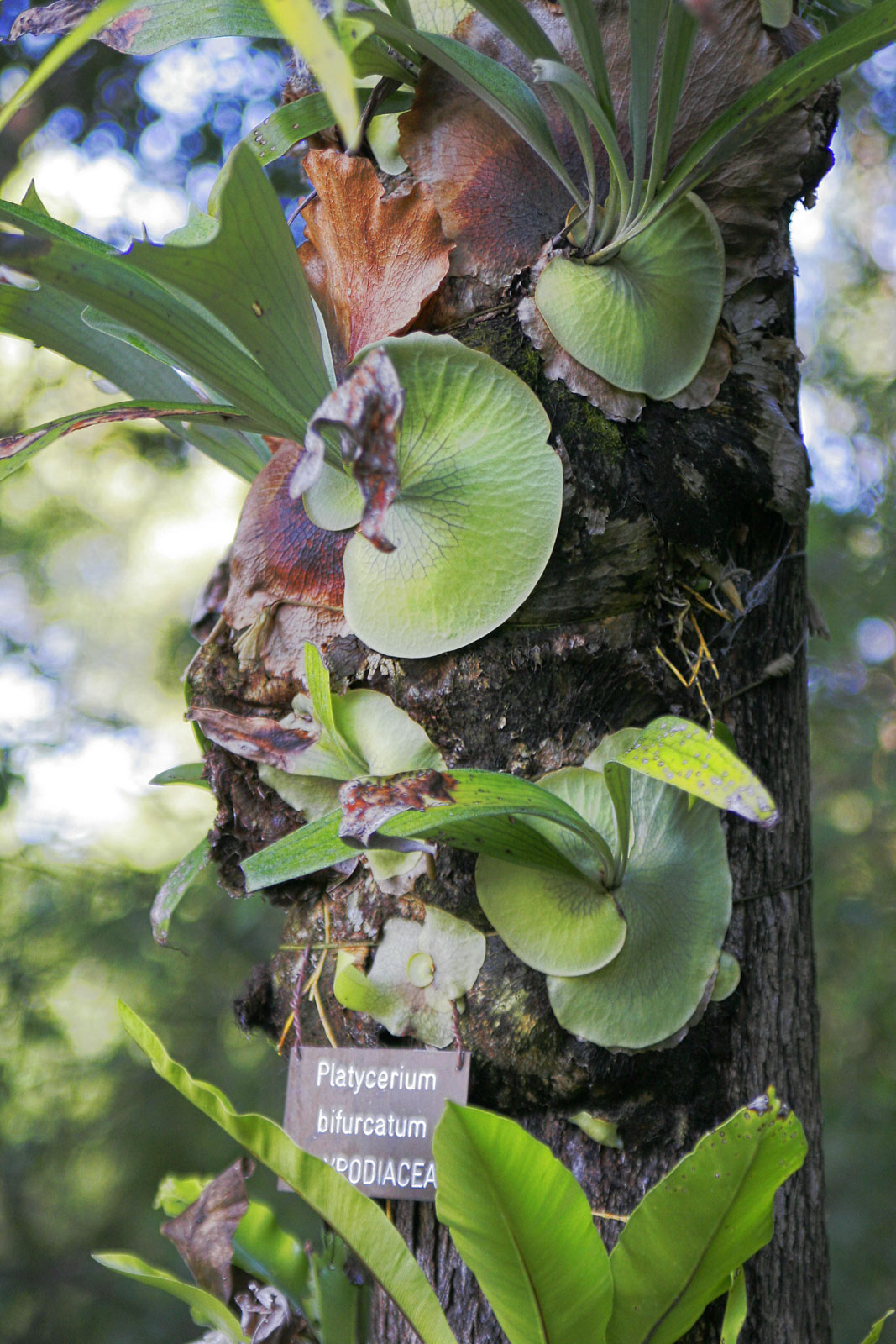
- Platycerium bifurcatum from the Australian National Botanical Gardens, Canberra

Scientific classification
- Kingdom: Plantae
- Clade: Tracheophytes
- Division: Polypodiophyta
- Class: Polypodiopsida
- Order: Polypodiales
- Suborder: Polypodiineae
- Family: Polypodiaceae
- Subfamily: Platycerioideae
- Genus: Platycerium; Desv.

Species
- Platycerium alcicorne; Platycerium andinum; Platycerium bifurcatum; Platycerium coronarium; Platycerium elephantotis; Platycerium ellisii; Platycerium grande; Platycerium hillii; Platycerium holttumii; Platycerium madagascariense; Platycerium quadridichotomum; Platycerium ridleyi; Platycerium stemaria; Platycerium superbum; Platycerium veitchii; Platycerium wallichii; Platycerium wandae; Platycerium willinckii

= Platycerium =

Genus of ferns

Platycerium is a genus of about 18 fern species in the polypod family, Polypodiaceae. Ferns in this genus are widely known as staghorn or elkhorn ferns due to their uniquely shaped fronds. This genus is epiphytic and is native to tropical and temperate areas of South America, Africa, Southeast Asia, Australia, and New Guinea.

== Description ==
Platycerium sporophytes (adult plants) have tufted roots, growing from a short rhizome, and bear two types of fronds - basal and fertile fronds. Basal fronds are sterile, shield- or kidney-shaped, and laminate against the tree, to protect the fern's roots from damage and desiccation. In some Platycerium species, the top margin of these fronds will grow into an open crown of lobes; catching rainwater, falling forest litter, bird/animal droppings, and even an occasional fallen deceased animal, these plants build up their own "compost" system of nutrition over many years.

Fertile fronds bear spores on their undersurface, are dichotomous or antler-shaped, and jut out or hang from the rhizome. The spores are borne in sporangia, clustered in large sori that are usually positioned on the tips of the lobes, on a specialized stalked lobe (as in P. ridleyi and P. coronarium), or at the sinus between frond lobes.

Some species of Platycerium are solitary, having only one rhizome. Other species form colonies when their rhizomes branch, or when new rhizomes are formed from root tips. If the conditions are right, the spores will germinate naturally, on surrounding trees. A Platycerium gametophyte is a small, heart-shaped thallus.

Platycerium have diverged into four natural groups. Several Platycerium are strongly adapted to xeric conditions, with a naturally drought-tolerant metabolism method having been reported for P. veitchii.

== Species ==
Image	Name	Distribution
	Platycerium alcicorne (P.Willemet) Desv	Madagascar, Comoros Island, Mauritius, Réunion, Seychelles, Kenya, Mozambique, Tanzania, Zimbabwe.
	Platycerium andinum Baker	Colombia, Bolivia and Peru.
	Platycerium bifurcatum (Cav.) C.Chr.	Australian states of New South Wales, Queensland, Norfolk Island and Lord Howe Island.
	Platycerium coronarium (J.Koenig) Desv.	Indonesia Sumatra, Kalimantan, West Java, Malaysia, Singapore, the Philippines, Thailand, Cambodia, Myanmar and Vietnam.
	Platycerium ellisii Baker	Madagascar only in the provinces of Antsiranana and Toamasina.
	Platycerium elephantotis Schweinf.	Angola, Benin, Burundi, Cameroon, Congo, Dem. Republic of Congo, Ethiopia, Gabon, Ghana, Guinea, Ivory Coast, Kenya, Liberia, Malawi, Mozambique, Nigeria, Rwanda, Senegal, Sierra Leone, Sudan and South Sudan, Tanzania, Togo, Uganda, Zambia, Zimbabwe, tropical Africa
	Platycerium grande (Fée) Kunze	Philippines Province of Mindanao and Indonesia, in the Province of North Sulawesi and Gorontalo.
	Platycerium hillii T.Moore	Australia Queensland, Papua New Guinea and Papua Indonesia.
	Platycerium holttumii de Jonch. & Hennipman	Malaysia, Northern Peninsular, State of Perlis, Kedah, Perak and Kelantan, Thailand and Indochina.
	Platycerium madagascariense Baker	Madagascar in the provinces of Antsiranana, Fianarantsoa and Toamasina.
	Platycerium quadridichotomum (Bonap.) Tardieu	Madagascar only in Ankarana, Bemaraha, Bemarivo, Montagne d'Ambre including Fôret d'Ambre.
	Platycerium ridleyi Christ	Malaysia, Southern Thailand, Indonesia Sumatra and Kalimantan.
	Platycerium stemaria (P.Beauv.) Desv.	Angola, Benin, Cameroon, Central African Republic, Congo, Dem. Republic of Congo, Equatorial Guinea (incl. Bioko), Gabon, Guinea Bissau, Liberia, Senegal, Sudan and South Sudan, Uganda, Principe, Sao Tomé, tropical Africa.
	Platycerium superbum de Jonch. & Hennipman	Queensland and New South Wales.
	Platycerium veitchii (Underw.) C.Chr.	Queensland.
	Platycerium wallichii Hook.	Northeastern India, Thailand, Laos, Malaysia, Myanmar and western Yunnan.
	Platycerium wandae Racib.	Papua New Guinea, Indonesia Papua and Maluku Island.
	Platycerium willinckii T.Moore	Sulawesi and Java

== Cultivation ==
The species Platycerium bifurcatum and Platycerium superbum are commonly cultivated as ornamental plants. These oddly shaped ferns grow on trees and rocks and can be found in gardens, especially tropical gardens.

Staghorns can be propagated by spores produced on the underside of the fertile fronds. Colonial Platycerium can also be vegetatively propagated by carefully dividing large healthy ones into smaller, separate plants. These new plants can then be attached to board mounts or be strapped to trees until they take to the tree themselves.

A mature staghorn can grow more than 1 metre (3.3 ft) wide.

== Gallery ==
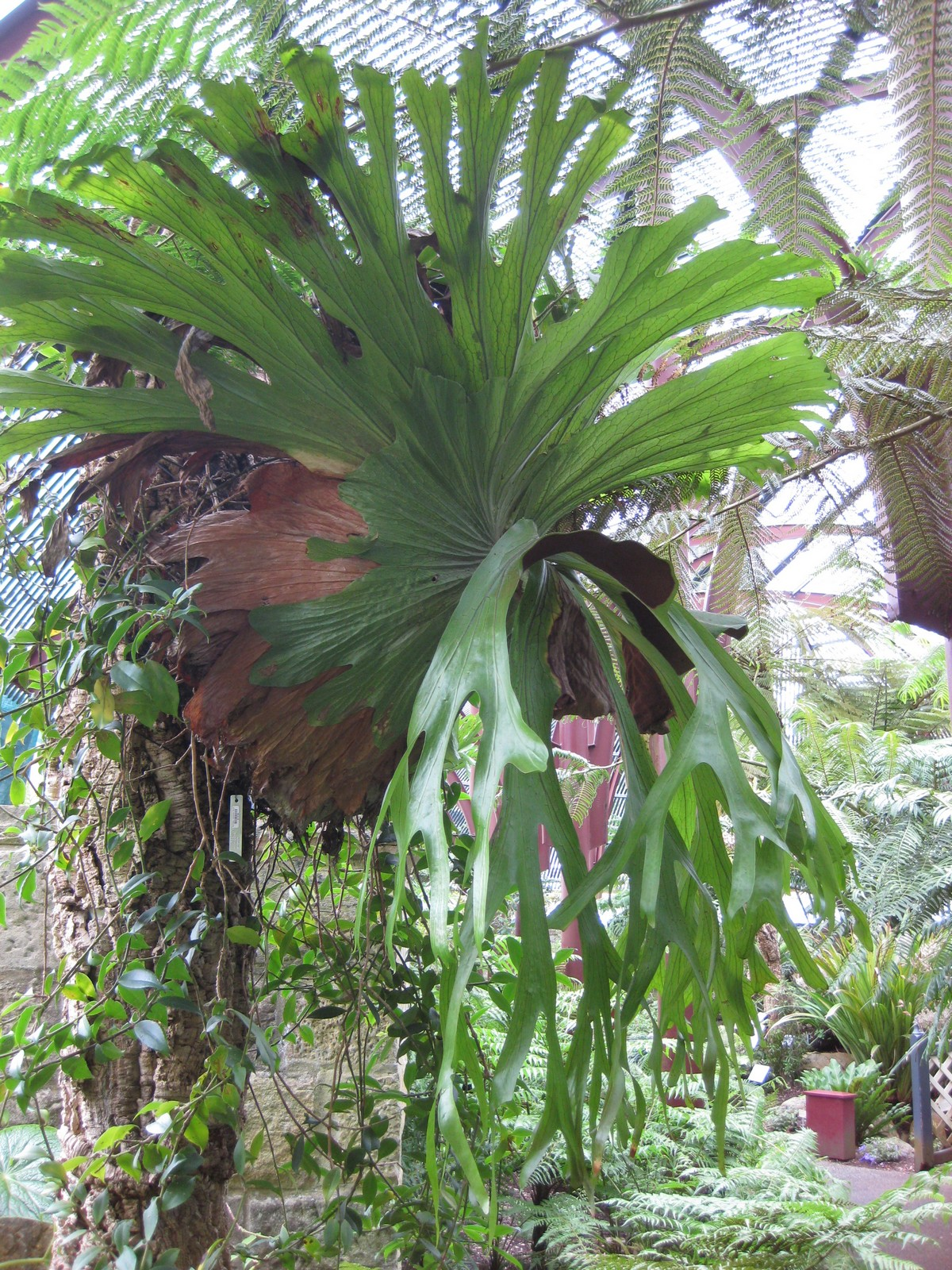
Platycerium superbum at the Royal Botanic Gardens Sydney, Australia

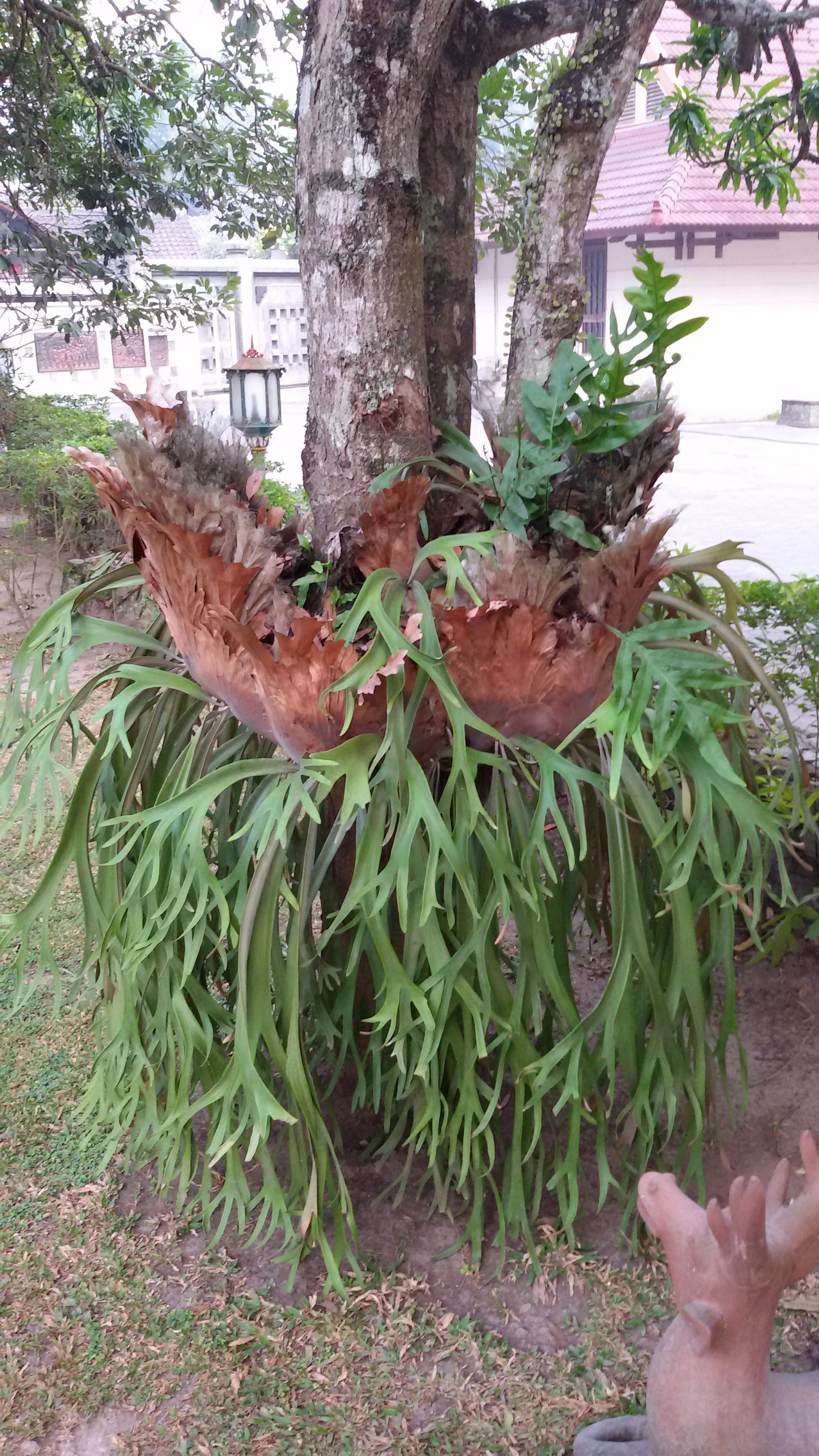
Platycerium bifurcatum from the Mendut Temple, Indonesia

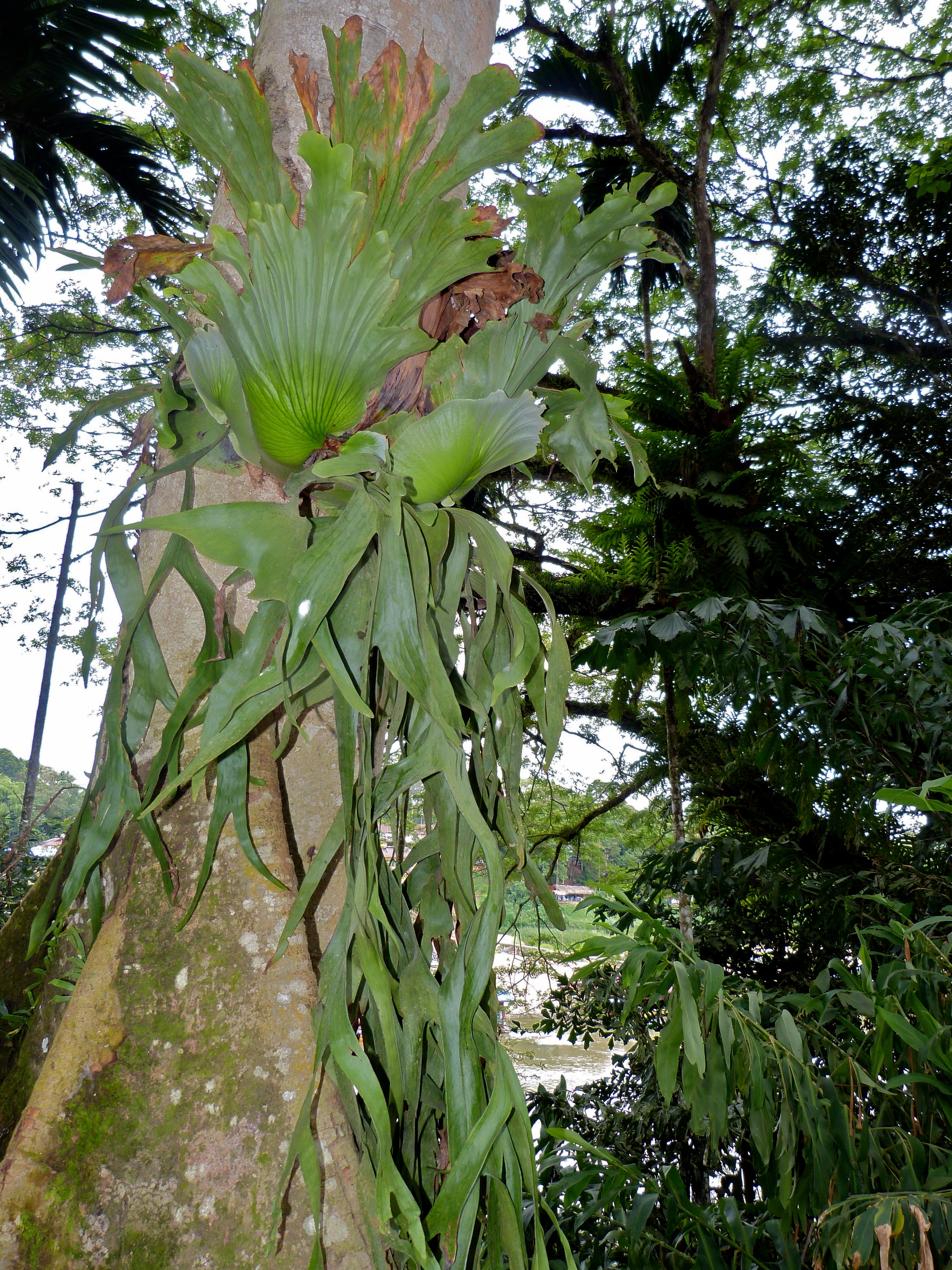
Platycerium coronarium from Pahang, Malaysia

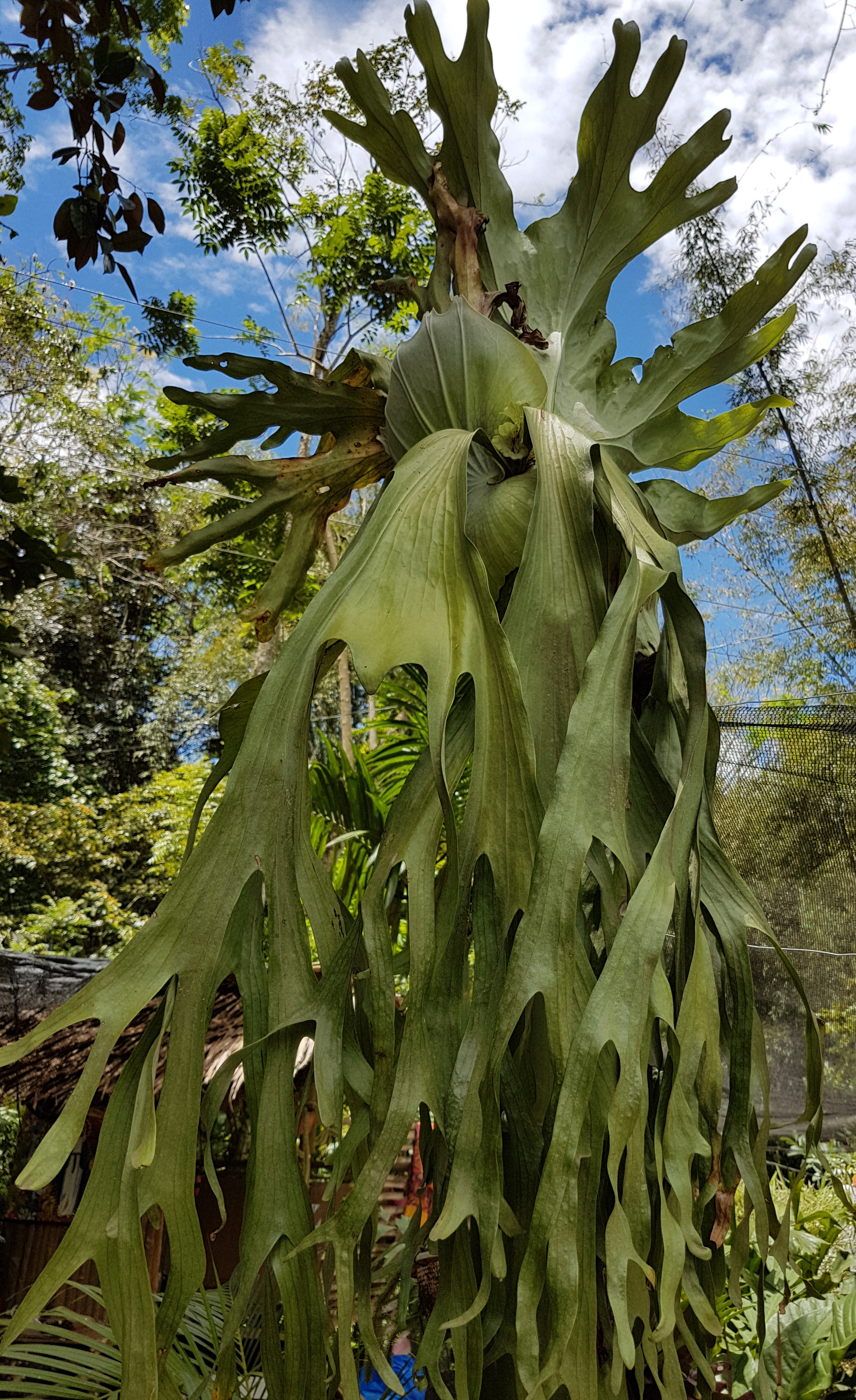
Platycerium grande from Bukidnon, Philippines

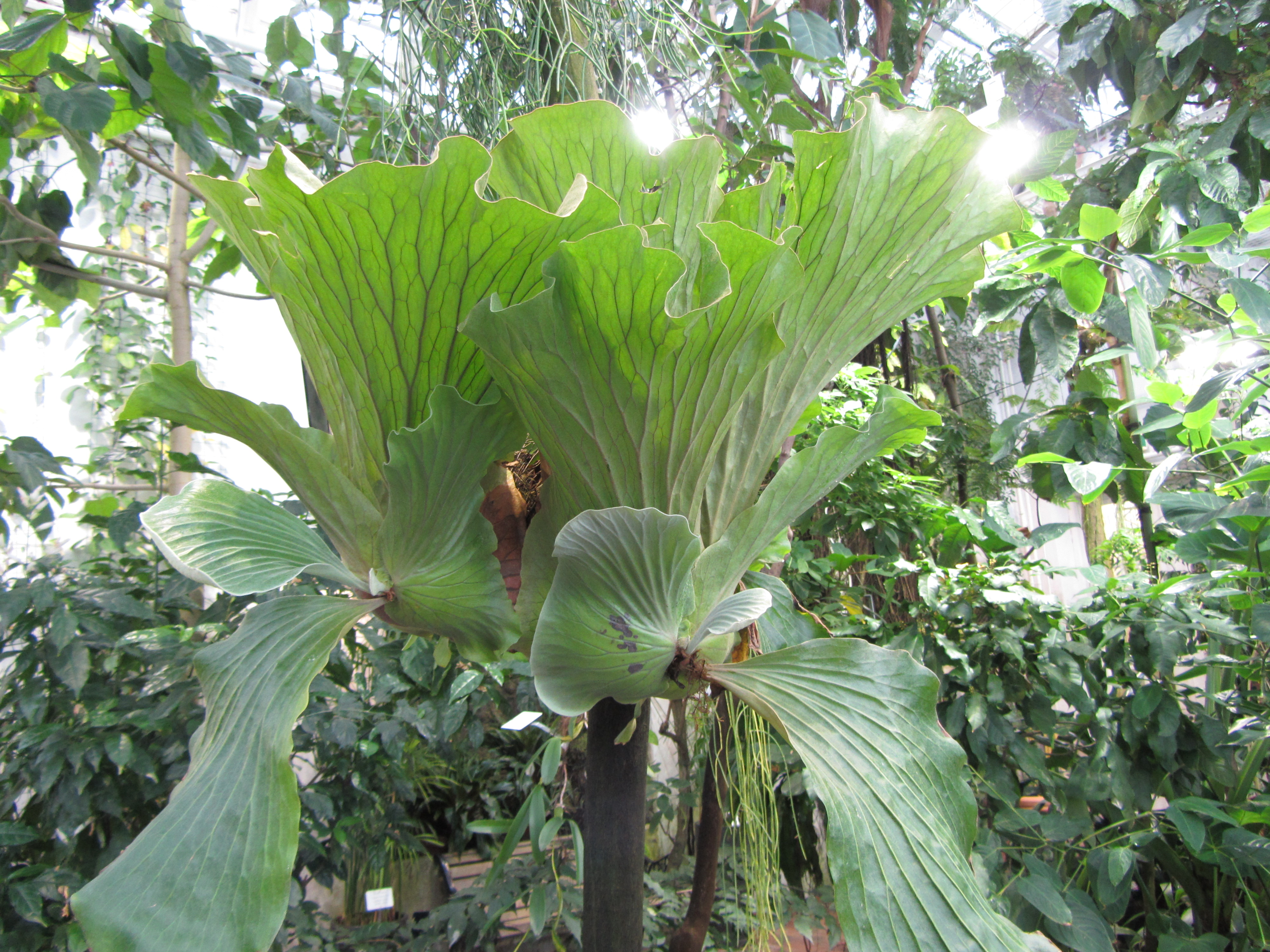
Platycerium elephantotis at Kaisaniemi Botanical Garden, Finland
