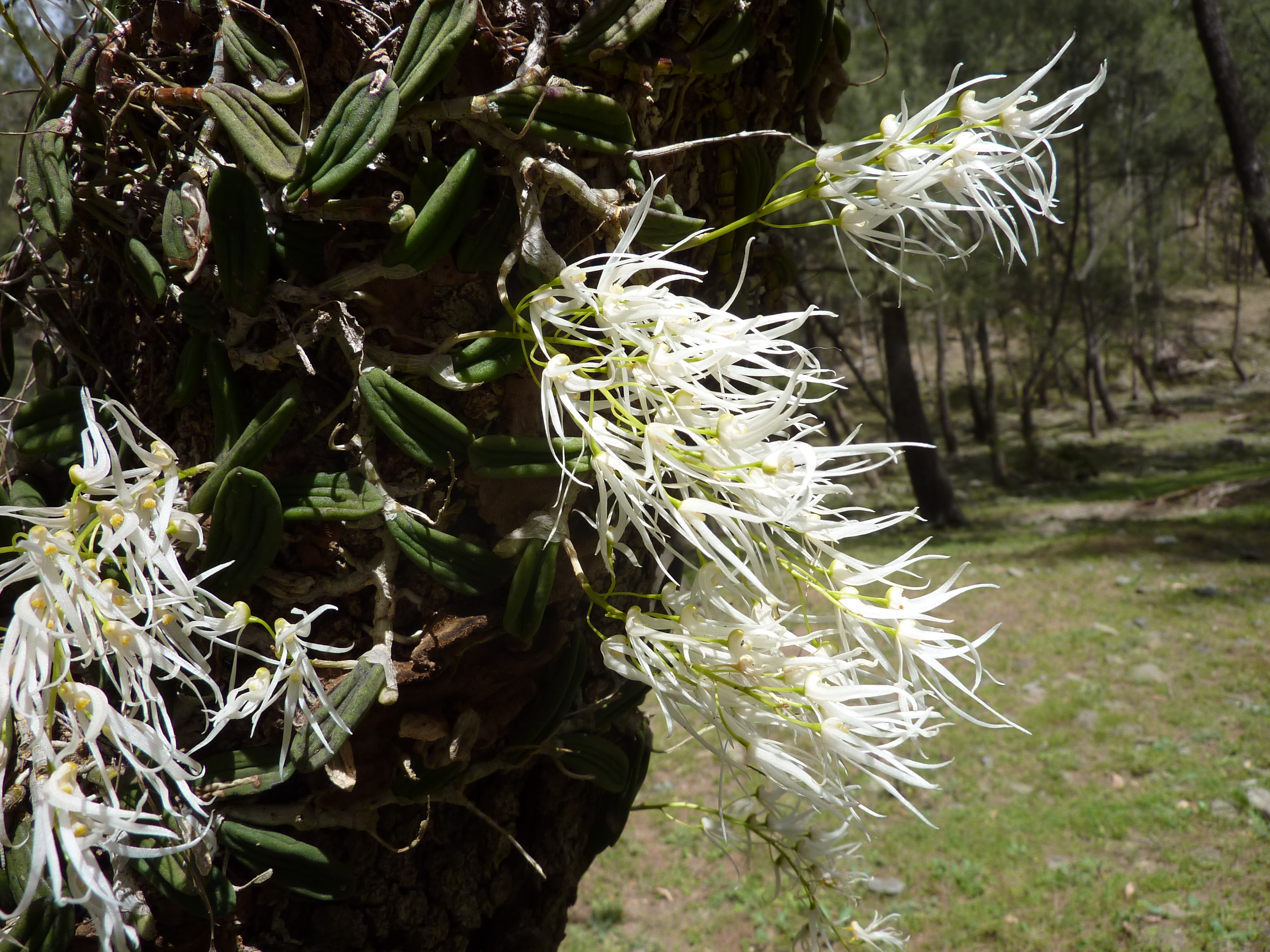
- Dendrobium linguiforme

Scientific classification
- Kingdom: Plantae
- Clade: Tracheophytes
- Clade: Angiosperms
- Clade: Monocots
- Order: Asparagales
- Family: Orchidaceae
- Subfamily: Epidendroideae
- Genus: Dendrobium
- Section: Dendrobium sect. Rhizobium; Lindl. & Paxton 1851

Type species
- Dendrobium linguiforme

Species
- See text

Synonyms
- Dockrillia (Brieger 1981).

= Dendrobium sect. Rhizobium =

Subgenus of flowering plants

Dendrobium section Rhizobium is a section of the genus Dendrobium.

== Description ==
Plants in this section have thick, fleshy to terete leaves produced along a thin and wiry stem.

The section was established in 1851 by John Lindley and Joseph Paxton. Species in this section was included in the genus Dockrilla, named after Alick Dockrill, by authors including David Jones, Mark Clements and Stephan Rauschert for some species formerly included in the genus Dendrobium. A 2008 paper, based on a study the molecular phylogenetics of a wide range of related orchids, concluded that "the splitting of Australasian dendrobiums into various genera by other authors is excessive and unnecessary" moving the species back to the section Rhizobium.

== Distribution ==
Plants from this section are found in Australia, New Guinea, New Caledonia and Vanuatu.

== Species ==
Dendrobium section Rhizobium comprises the following species:

Image	Name	Distribution	Elevation (m)
	Dendrobium bowmanii Benth. 1873	Australia (Queensland and New South Wales) and New Caledonia.	0–200 metres (0–656 ft)
	Dendrobium brevicaudum D.L.Jones & M.A.Clem. 1994	Australia (Queensland)	700–950 metres (2,300–3,120 ft)
	Dendrobium casuarinae Schltr. 1918	New Caledonia	0–1,000 metres (0–3,281 ft)
	Dendrobium caudiculatum M.A.Clem. & D.L.Jones 1996	Papua New Guinea	40–900 metres (130–2,950 ft)
	Dendrobium chordiforme Kraenzl. 1910	Papua New Guinea	10–3,300 metres (33–10,827 ft)
	Dendrobium contextum Schuit. & de Vogel ex J.M.H.Shaw 2003	Papua New Guinea	1,200 metres (3,900 ft)
	Dendrobium crispatum (G.Forst.) Sw. 1799	French Polynesia (Society Islands)	
	Dendrobium cucumerinum MacLeay ex Lindl. 1842	Australia (Queensland, New South Wales)	50–800 metres (160–2,620 ft)
	Dendrobium erythraeum Schuit. & de Vogel 2003	Papua New Guinea	
	Dendrobium flagellum Schltr. 1912	New Guinea	150 metres (490 ft)
	Dendrobium fuliginosum (M.A.Clem. & D.L.Jones) P.F.Hunt 1998	New Guinea	
	Dendrobium leptophyton Schuit. & de Vogel 2003	Papua New Guinea	900–2,000 metres (3,000–6,600 ft)
	Dendrobium lichenastrum (F.Muell.) Rolfe 1905	Australia (Queensland)	0–1,950 metres (0–6,398 ft)
	Dendrobium linguiforme Sw. 1800	Australia (Queensland and New South Wales)	0–1,200 metres (0–3,937 ft)
	Dendrobium mortii F.Muell. 1859	New Caledonia, Australia (Queensland and New South Wales)	300–900 metres (980–2,950 ft)
	Dendrobium nothofageti (M.A.Clem. & D.L.Jones) Schuit. & de Vogel 2003	Papua New Guinea	2,800 metres (9,200 ft)
	Dendrobium pugioniforme A.Cunn. ex Lindl. 1839	Australia (Queensland and New South Wales)	0–1,300 metres (0–4,265 ft)
	Dendrobium racemosum (Nicholls) Clemesha & Dockrill 1964	Australia (Queensland)	800–1,500 metres (2,600–4,900 ft)
	Dendrobium rigidum R.Br. 1810	Australia(Queensland) and New Guinea	700 metres (2,300 ft)
	Dendrobium schoeninum Lindl. 1846	Australia (Queensland and New South Wales)	600 metres (2,000 ft)
	Dendrobium striolatum Rchb.f. 1857	Australia (New South Wales, Victoria and Tasmania)	1,000 metres (3,300 ft)
	Dendrobium teretifolium R.Br. 1810	Australia (Queensland and New South Wales)	5–800 metres (16–2,625 ft)
	Dendrobium toressae (F.M.Bailey) Dockrill 1964	Australia (Queensland)	50–1,220 metres (160–4,000 ft)
	Dendrobium vagans Schltr. 1911	New Caledonia, Fiji, Samoa, Vanuatu and the Santa Cruz Islands	0–1,300 metres (0–4,265 ft)
	Dendrobium wassellii S.T.Blake 1963	Australia (Queensland)	300 metres (980 ft)

== Natural Hybrids ==
Image	Name	Parentage	Distribution
	Dendrobium × grimesii C.T.White & Summerh. 1934	Dendrobium linguiforme × Dendrobium teretifolium	Queensland, Australia
