= Rattail orchid =

Rattail orchid is a term referring to several more or less closely related orchid species, which have inflorescences or aerial roots resembling a rat's tail in shape. It can refer to:

- Dendrobium mortii (Pencil orchid)
- Dendrobium racemosum
- Dendrobium striolatum (Streaked rock orchid)
- Dendrobium tenuissimum
- Dockrillia teretifolia (Bridal-veil orchid)
- Oncidium cebolleta
- Paraphalaenopsis labukensis
