= Rat tail =

Rat tail or rat's tail may refer to:

- The tail of a rat
- Grenadier, fish of the family Macrouridae known as "rattail"
- Rattail (casting), a defect in metal casting
- Rattail (haircut)
- Rattail skate (Dipturus lanceorostratus), a fish endemic to Mozambique
- Rat-tail splice, a type of electrical splice
- Babiana ringens, a flowering plant of South Africa
- Raphanus caudatus or rattail radish

== See also ==
- Rat-tailed maggot
- Rat tail cactus (disambiguation)
- Rattail orchid (disambiguation)
