= Dendrobium rigidum =

Smooth tongue orchid

Scientific classification
- Kingdom: Plantae
- Clade: Tracheophytes
- Clade: Angiosperms
- Clade: Monocots
- Order: Asparagales
- Family: Orchidaceae
- Subfamily: Epidendroideae
- Genus: Dendrobium
- Species: D. rigidum

Binomial name
- Dendrobium rigidum R.Br.

Species of orchid

Dendrobium rigidum, commonly known as the smooth tongue orchid or smooth tick orchid, is a species of orchid native to tropical North Queensland and to New Guinea. It is an epiphytic or lithophytic orchid with wiry, hanging stems, fleshy, dark green leaves and flowering stems with between two and seven crowded, cream-coloured, star-shaped flowers often with pink or red on the back. It grows on trees, shrubs and rocks in a paperbark swamps and rainforest.

== Description ==
Dendrobium rigidum is an epiphytic or lithophytic herb with wiry, hanging stems 20–30 mm (0.8–1 in) long and about 3 mm (0.12 in) wide. The leaves are egg-shaped, smooth and fleshy, dark green, 30–60 mm (1–2 in) long and about 15 mm (0.59 in) wide. The flowering stem emerges from near a leaf base and is 10–30 mm (0.4–1 in) long. There are between two and seven cream-coloured flowers 9–12 mm (0.35–0.47 in) long, 12–15 mm (0.47–0.59 in) wide with the sepals and petals spreading apart with their bases overlapping. The sepals are 7–9 mm (0.28–0.35 in) long, about 4.5 mm (0.18 in) wide and the petals are a similar length but less than half as wide. The labellum is curved, about 10 mm (0.4 in) long and 7 mm (0.3 in) wide with red or orange markings. Flowering occurs sporadically throughout the year.

== Taxonomy and naming ==
Dendrobium rigidum was first formally described in 1810 by Robert Brown and the description was published in Prodromus Florae Novae Hollandiae et Insulae Van Diemen. The specific epithet (rigidum) is a Latin word meaning "stiff", "hard" or "inflexible".

== Distribution and habitat ==
The smooth tongue orchid grows on trees, shrubs and sometimes on rocks in mangroves, paperbark swamps and rainforest in New Guinea, on some Torres Strait Islands and on the Cape York Peninsula as far south as the Russell River.
