= Rat tail cactus =

Rat tail cactus is the common name for several members of the cactus family:

- Aporocactus flagelliformis
- Cylindropuntia leptocaulis
- Cleistocactus winteri (Golden rat tail)
- Mammillaria pottsii (rat-tail nipple cactus)
