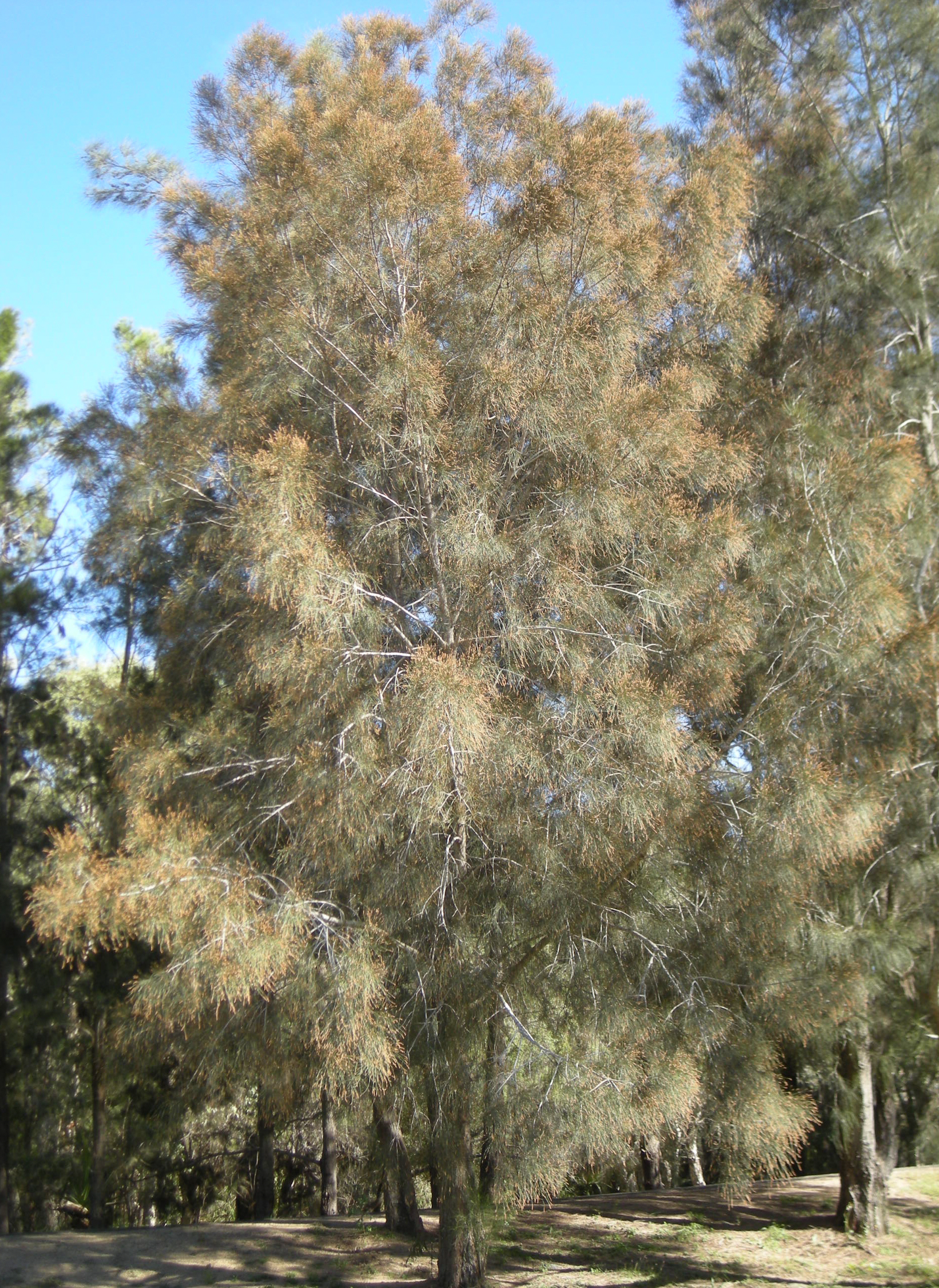
- In Mount Archer National Park

Scientific classification
- Kingdom: Plantae
- Clade: Tracheophytes
- Clade: Angiosperms
- Clade: Eudicots
- Clade: Rosids
- Order: Fagales
- Family: Casuarinaceae
- Genus: Casuarina
- Species: C. cunninghamiana

Binomial name
- Casuarina cunninghamiana Miq.

= Casuarina cunninghamiana =

Species of tree

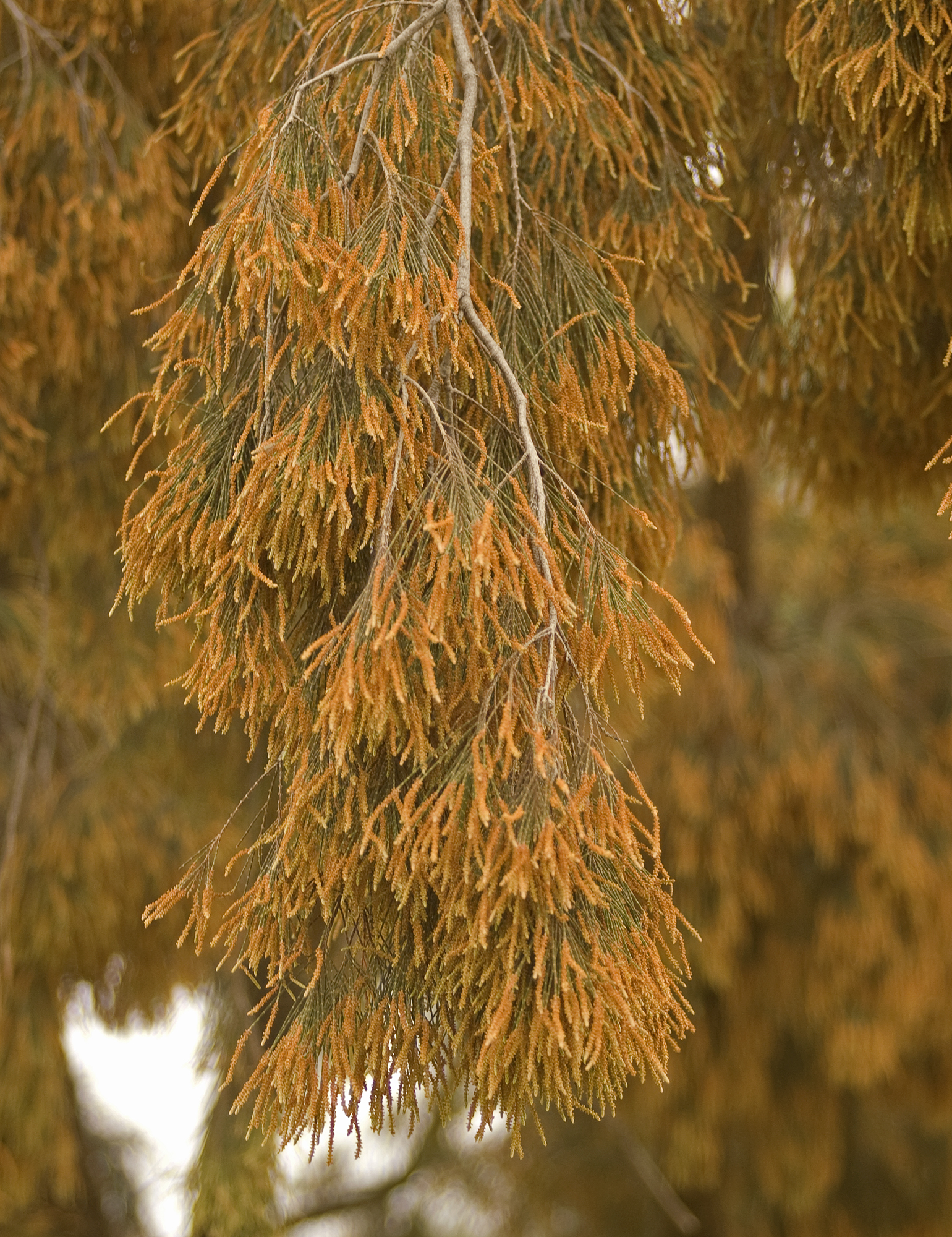
Male flowers of subsp. cunninghamiana

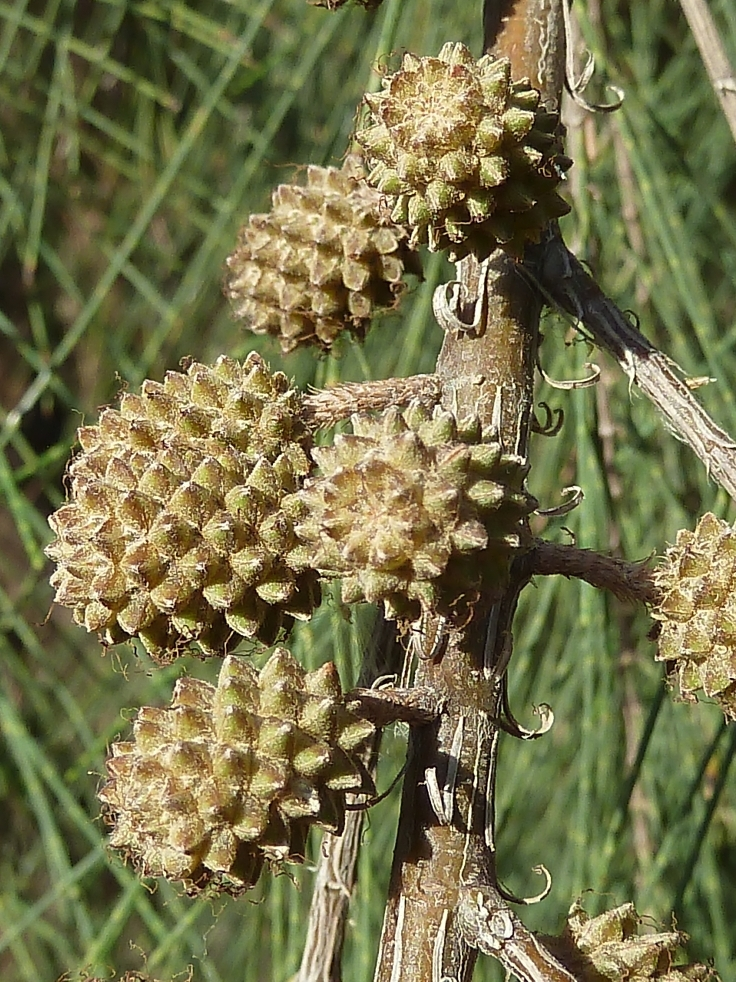
Immature female cones

Casuarina cunninghamiana, commonly known as river oak, river sheoak or creek oak, is a species of flowering plant in the family Casuarinaceae and is native to Australia and New Guinea. It is a tree with fissured and scaly bark, sometimes drooping branchlets, the leaves reduced to scales in whorls of 6 to 10, the fruit 7–14 mm (0.28–0.55 in) long containing winged seeds (samaras) 3–4 mm (0.12–0.16 in) long.

== Description ==
Casuarina cunninghamiana is a dioecious tree that typically grows to a height of 15–35 m (49–115 ft), has a DBH of 0.5–1.5 m (1 ft 8 in – 4 ft 11 in). Its bark is finely fissured, scaly and greyish brown. The branchlets are often drooping, 100–250 mm (3.9–9.8 in) long, the leaves reduced to scale-like teeth 0.3–0.5 mm (0.01–0.02 in) long, arranged in whorls of 6 to 10 around the branchlets. The sections of branchlet between the leaf whorls (the "articles") are 4–9 mm (0.2–0.4 in) long and 0.4–0.7 mm (0.02–0.03 in) wide. The flowers on male trees are arranged in spikes 4–40 mm (0.2–1.6 in) long, the anthers 0.4–0.7 mm (0.02–0.03 in) long. The female cones are on a peduncle 2–9 mm (0.08–0.4 in) long and sparsely covered with soft hairs. Mature cones are usually 7–14 mm (0.3–0.6 in) long and 4–6 mm (0.16–0.24 in) in diameter, the samaras 3–4 mm (0.12–0.16 in) long.

== Taxonomy ==
Casuarina cunninghamiana was first formally described in 1848 by Friedrich Miquel in his book Revisio critica Casuarinarum from specimens collected by Allan Cunningham near Moreton Bay. The specific epithet (cunninghamiana) honours the collector of the type specimens.

In 1989, Lawrie Johnson and Alex George described subsp. miodon in the Flora of Australia, and the name, and that of the autonym are accepted by the Australian Plant Census:

- Casuarina cunninghamiana Miq. subsp. cunninghamiana is a tree to 15–35 m (49–115 ft), the articles 6–9 mm (0.24–0.35 in) long with 8 to 10 teeth.
- Casuarina cunninghamiana subsp. miodon L.A.S.Johnson is a tree to 20 m (66 ft), the articles 4–7 mm (0.16–0.28 in) long with 6 or 7 teeth.

== Distribution and habitat ==
This casuarina mainly grows in pure stands in open forest on the banks of freshwater rivers and streams in Australia and New Guinea.

Subspecies cunninghamiana occurs from Laura, Chillagoe and Augathella in Queensland to Condobolin and Narrandera in New South Wales, and the Australian Capital Territory. Subspecies miodon occurs between the Daly River in the north of the Northern Territory to the Gulf of Carpentaria in Queensland.

== Uses ==
River oak is widely recognised as an important tree for stabilising riverbanks and for soil erosion prevention accepting wet and dry soils. The foliage is quite palatable to stock.

== Invasive species ==
Casuarina cunninghamiana is an invasive species in the Everglades in Florida and in South Africa.
