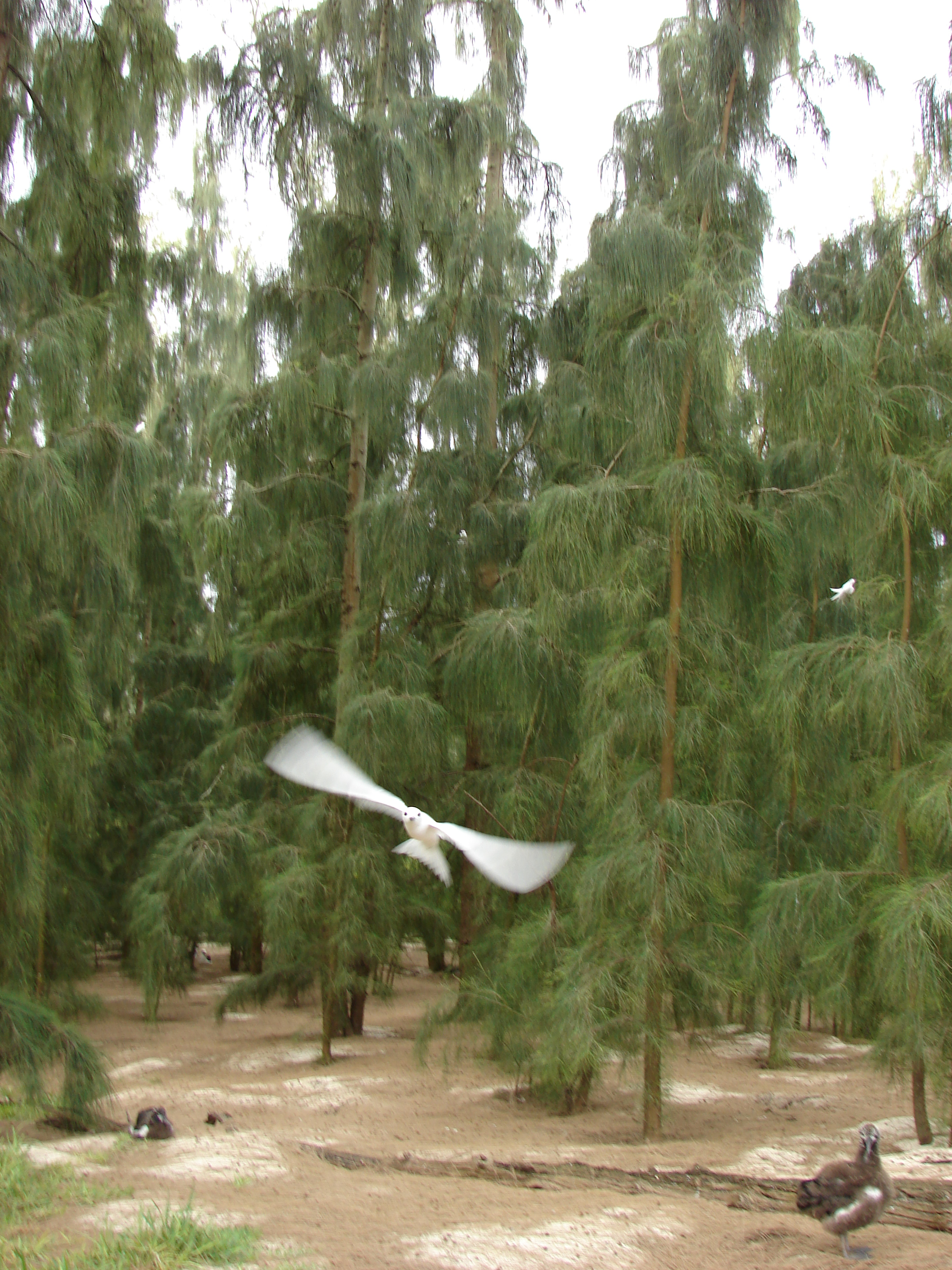
- In Midway Atoll

Scientific classification
- Kingdom: Plantae
- Clade: Tracheophytes
- Clade: Angiosperms
- Clade: Eudicots
- Clade: Rosids
- Order: Fagales
- Family: Casuarinaceae
- Genus: Casuarina
- Species: C. glauca

Binomial name
- Casuarina glauca Sieber ex Spreng.

Synonyms
- Casuarina obtusa Miq. nom. inval., pro syn.

= Casuarina glauca =

Species of tree

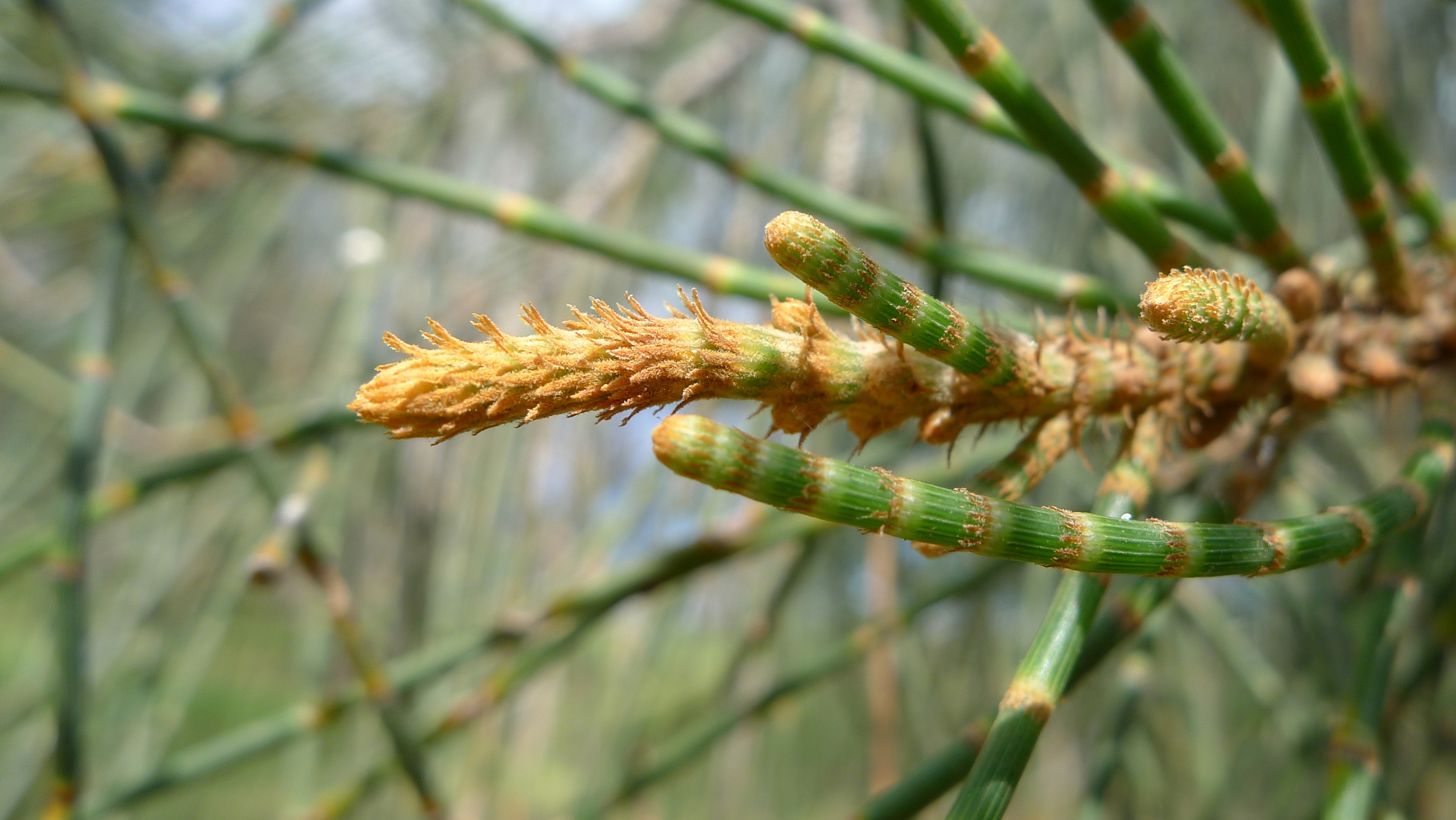
New growth

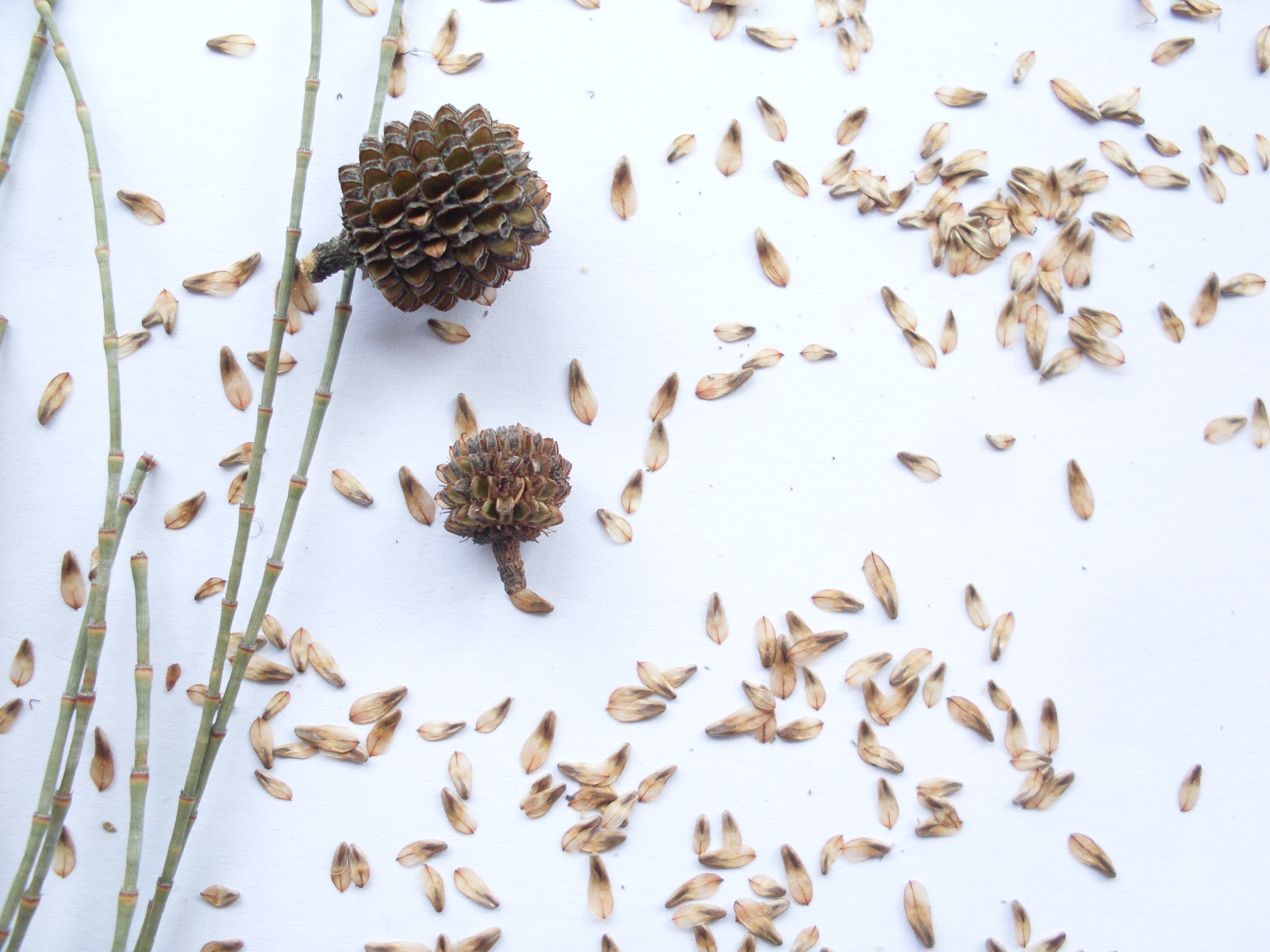
Cones and samaras

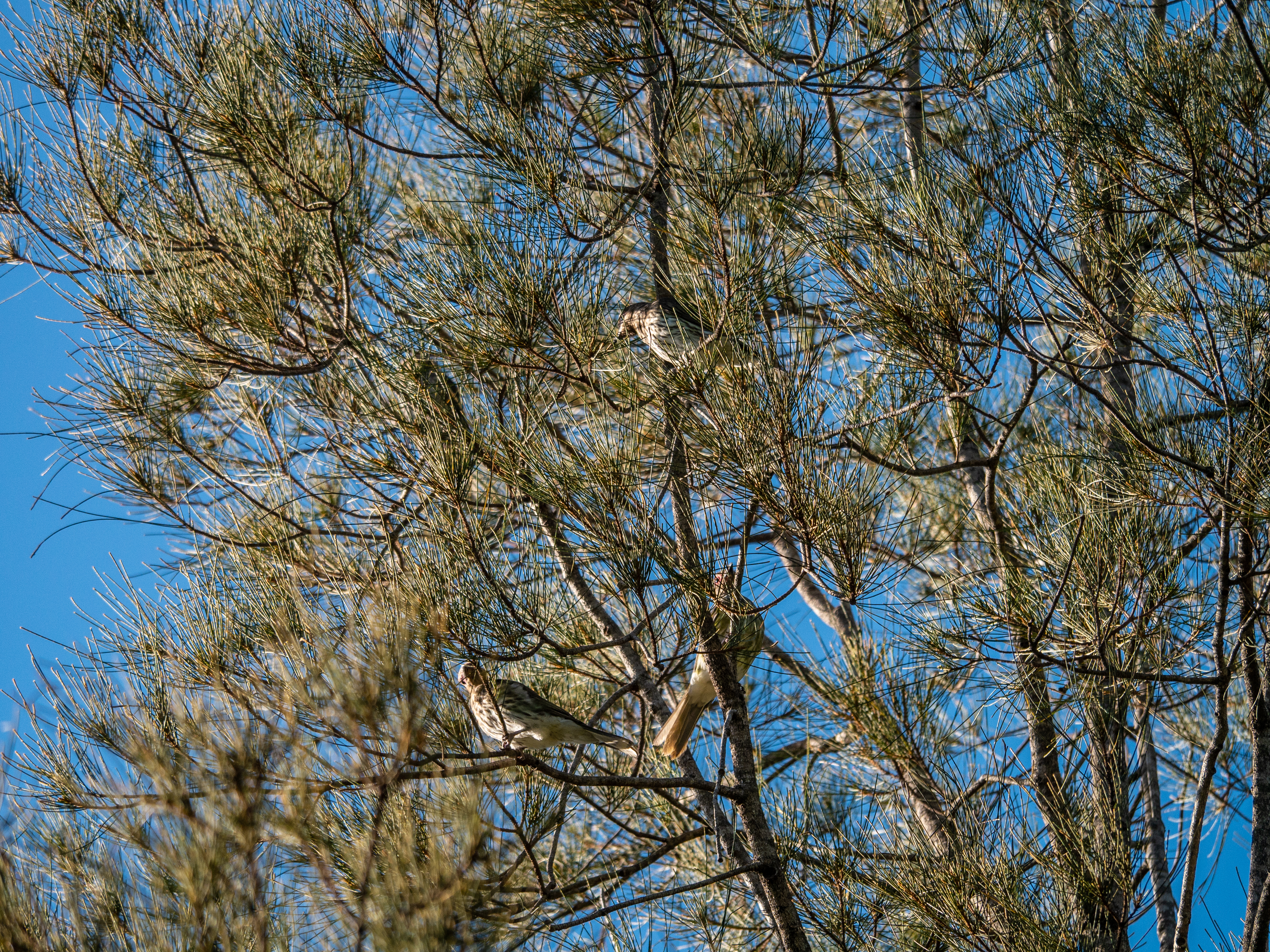
Australasian figbird roosting on the tree

Casuarina glauca, commonly known as swamp oak, is a species of flowering plant that is endemic to eastern Australia. It is also known as swamp buloke, swamp she-oak, marsh sheoak or grey she-oak, and is called guman by the Gadigal people in the Dharug language. It is a dioecious tree that often forms root suckers and has fissured and scaly bark, spreading or drooping branchlets, the leaves reduced to scales in whorls of 12 to 20, the fruit 9–18 mm (0.35–0.71 in) long containing winged seeds (samaras) 3.5–5.0 mm (0.14–0.20 in) long.

== Description ==
Casuarina glauca is a dioecious tree that typically grows to a height of 8–20 m (26–66 ft), sometimes to 35 m (115 ft), rarely a shrub to about 2 m (6 ft 7 in), and that often forms root suckers. The bark is greyish brown, fissured and scaly. The branchlets are sometimes drooping, up to 380 mm (15 in) long, the leaves reduced to scale-like teeth about 0.6–0.9 mm (0.024–0.035 in) long, arranged in whorls of usually 12 to 17 around the branchlets, and long and curved back when young. The sections of branchlet between the leaf whorls (the "articles") are 8–20 mm (0.31–0.79 in) long and 0.9–1.2 mm (0.035–0.047 in) wide.

Male flowers are arranged in spikes 12–40 mm (0.47–1.57 in) long in whorls of 7 to 10 per centimetre (per 0.4 inch) and the anthers about 0.8 mm (0.031 in) long. The female cones are on a peduncle 3–12 mm (0.12–0.47 in) long and sparsely covered with soft, white to rust-coloured hairs when young. Mature cones are 9–18 mm (0.35–0.71 in) long and 7–9 mm (0.28–0.35 in) in diameter, the samaras 3.5–5.0 mm (0.14–0.20 in) long.

== Taxonomy ==
Casuarina glauca was first formally described in 1826 by Kurt Sprengel in Systema Vegetabilium from an unpublished description by Franz Sieber. The specific epithet (glauca) means 'glaucous'.

The Kabi name for the plant, bilai, was used for the town and locality of Bli Bli, Queensland.

This species is closely related to C. cunninghamiana, and hybrids with C. cunninghamiana subsp. cunninghamiana have been recorded where the two species co-occur, such as at Lower Portland and Wisemans Ferry.

== Distribution and habitat ==
Swamp she-oak is found along Australia's east coast from Yeppoon in central Queensland to Bermagui in southern New South Wales. Some stands within the Royal Botanic Gardens in Sydney predate European settlement. Populations along the New South Wales coastline are at risk due to clearing of habitat for development. It has become highly invasive in Florida.

Casuarina glauca grows in or near brackish water along the banks of rivers and estuaries. Suckering from the roots, the swamp oak can form dense stands of trees. It grows on alluvial soils of sandstone or shale origin. The water table lies 30 cm or less under the surface. This tree then acts to turn shallows into land by preventing erosion and collecting material among its roots. They are also a predominant species in the Coastal Swamp Oak Forests in southeastern Australia.

== Ecology ==
Casuarina glauca is an actinorhizal plant producing root nitrogen-fixing nodules infested by Frankia. There is a regular pattern of cell layers containing flavans. Although not a legume, C. glauca, produces a hemoglobin (not a leghemoglobin) in its symbiotic root nodules.

The rat's tail orchid (Dendrobium teretifolium) grows on the swamp oak.

It has become naturalised in the Everglades in Florida where it is considered a weed.

C. glauca trees can live up to 200 years.

Trees regenerate after fire by growing from the roots. Cut stumps sprout suckers vigorously, producing groves of new trees. C. glauca trees drop large amounts of litter, mainly old cones and branchlets, which eventually rots down and enriches the soil unless removed by a flood event.

Understory plants recorded from swamp oak groves include Juncus kraussii, Baumea juncea and Sporobolus virginicus on sandier soils and Apium prostratum, Carex appressa, Goodenia ovata, Juncus kraussii and Phragmites australis and the vine Parsonsia straminea on clay soils.

Glossy black cockatoos break the cones to eat the seeds, which mature in winter. The seed is eaten by the red-browed finch, and peaceful dove (Geopelia placida).

== Cultivation and uses ==
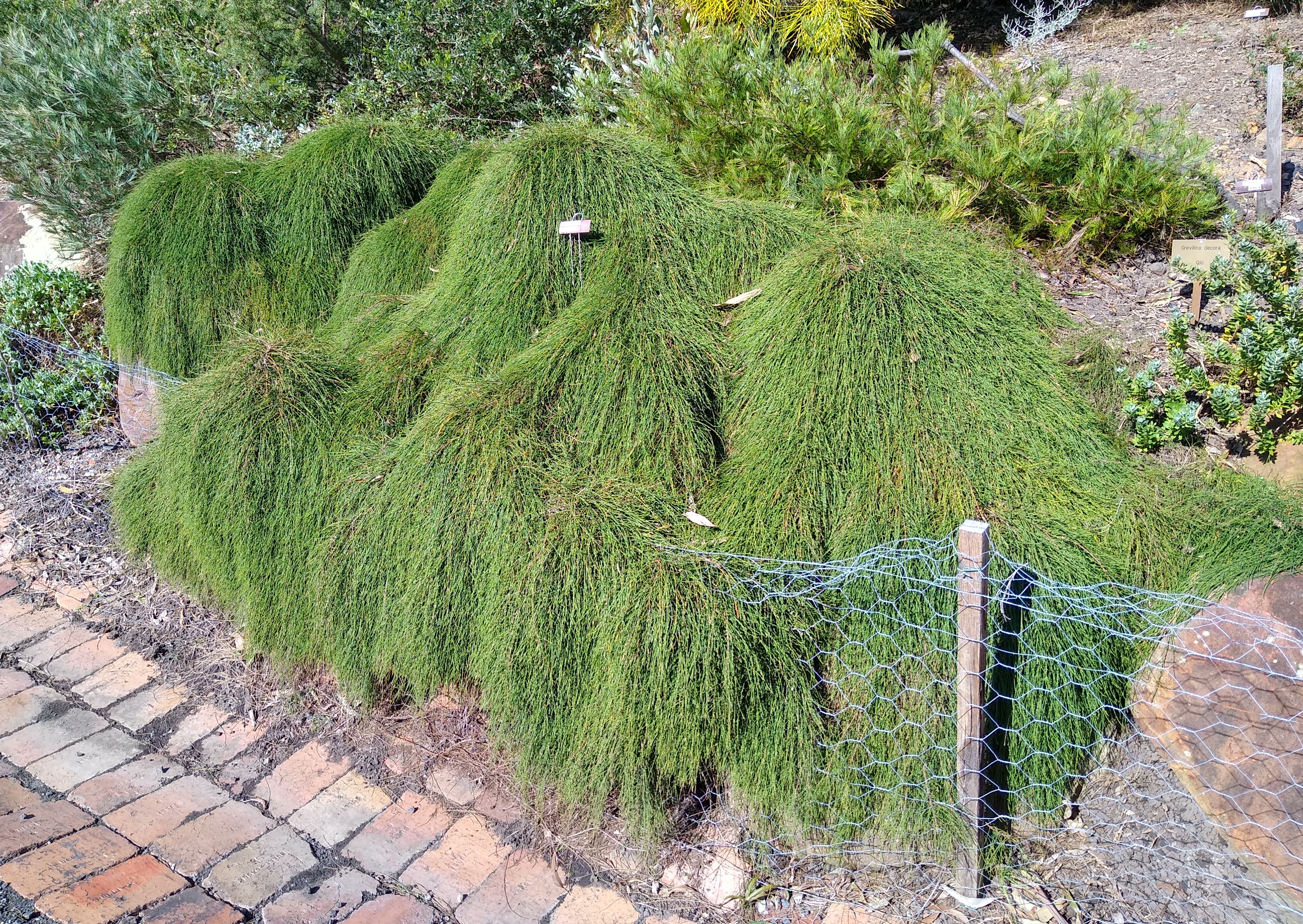
'Cousin It' cultivar in Illawarra Grevillea Park

Casuarina glauca has been planted widely as a street tree in Canberra. It was introduced to Haiti to stabilise the soil and to be used as timber for poles, and to Florida where it was planted as an ornamental plant and windbreak.

The bark has been used to plant orchids on.

It tolerates waterlogged soils and even soils with some salinity. A significant inconvenience in urban settings is that its roots can invade underground water and sewer pipes if these are within 15 m (50 ft) of the tree. It can also acidify acid sulphate soils as it lowers the water table.

Two prostrate forms are commercially available: Casuarina 'Cousin It' is a cultivar arising from material from Booderee National Park on the New South Wales south coast collected in 1989 and named for its resemblance to Cousin Itt, and C. ‘Kattang Karpet’ is propagated by the Australian Botanic Garden from material collected at Kattang Nature Reserve on the New South Wales mid-north coast in 1998.
