= D'Aguilar National Park =

National park in Australia

- IUCN category II (national park)
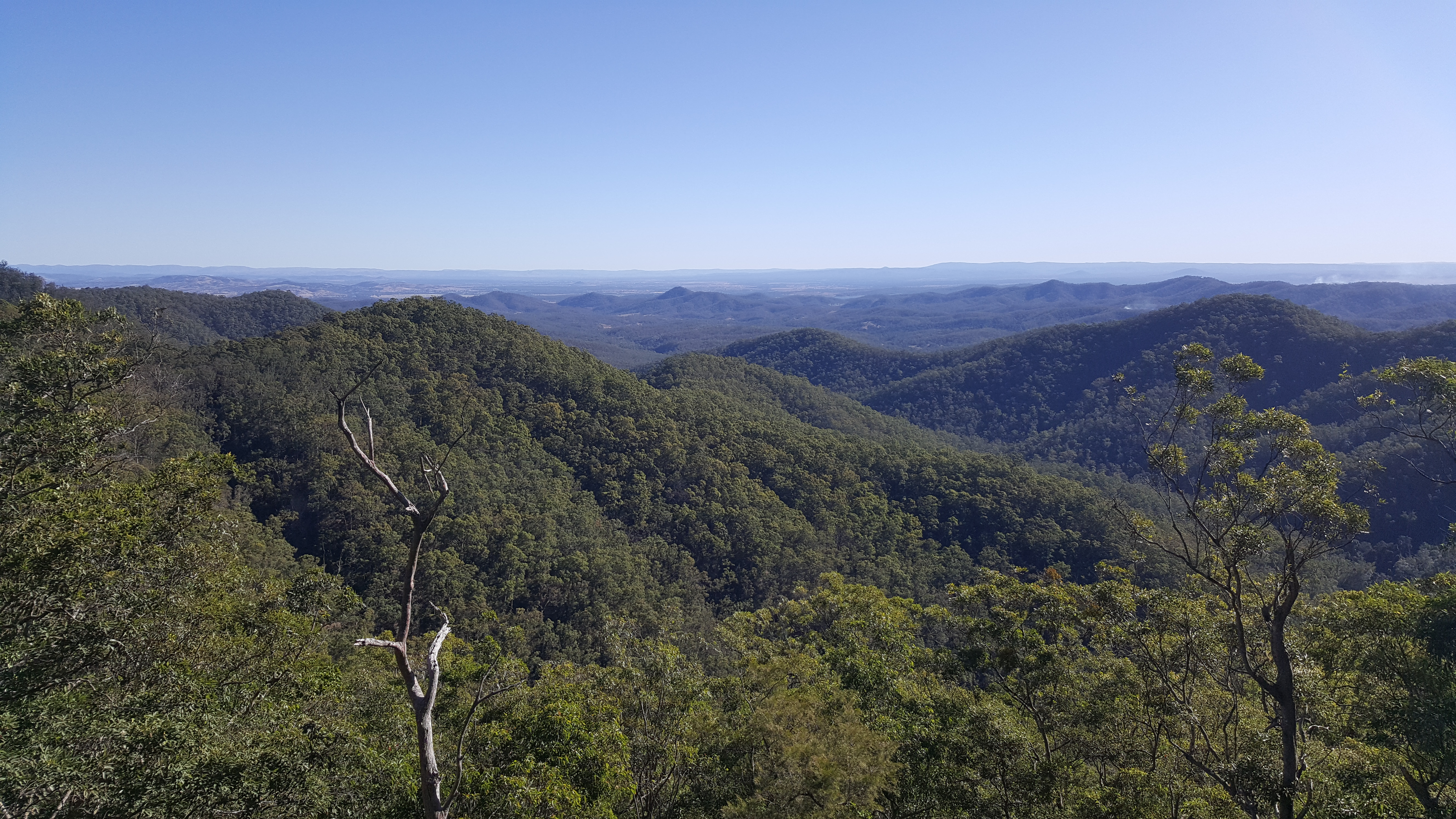
- Westridge Outlook, D'Aguilar National Park

- Location within Queensland
- Location: Queensland
- Coordinates: 27°18′32″S 152°46′40″E
- Area: 20.50 km^{2} (7.92 sq mi)
- Established: 1938
- Visitors: 812,000 (domestic visitors only) (in 2012)
- Governing body: Queensland Parks and Wildlife Service
- Website: www.nprsr.qld.gov.au/parks/daguilar/index.html

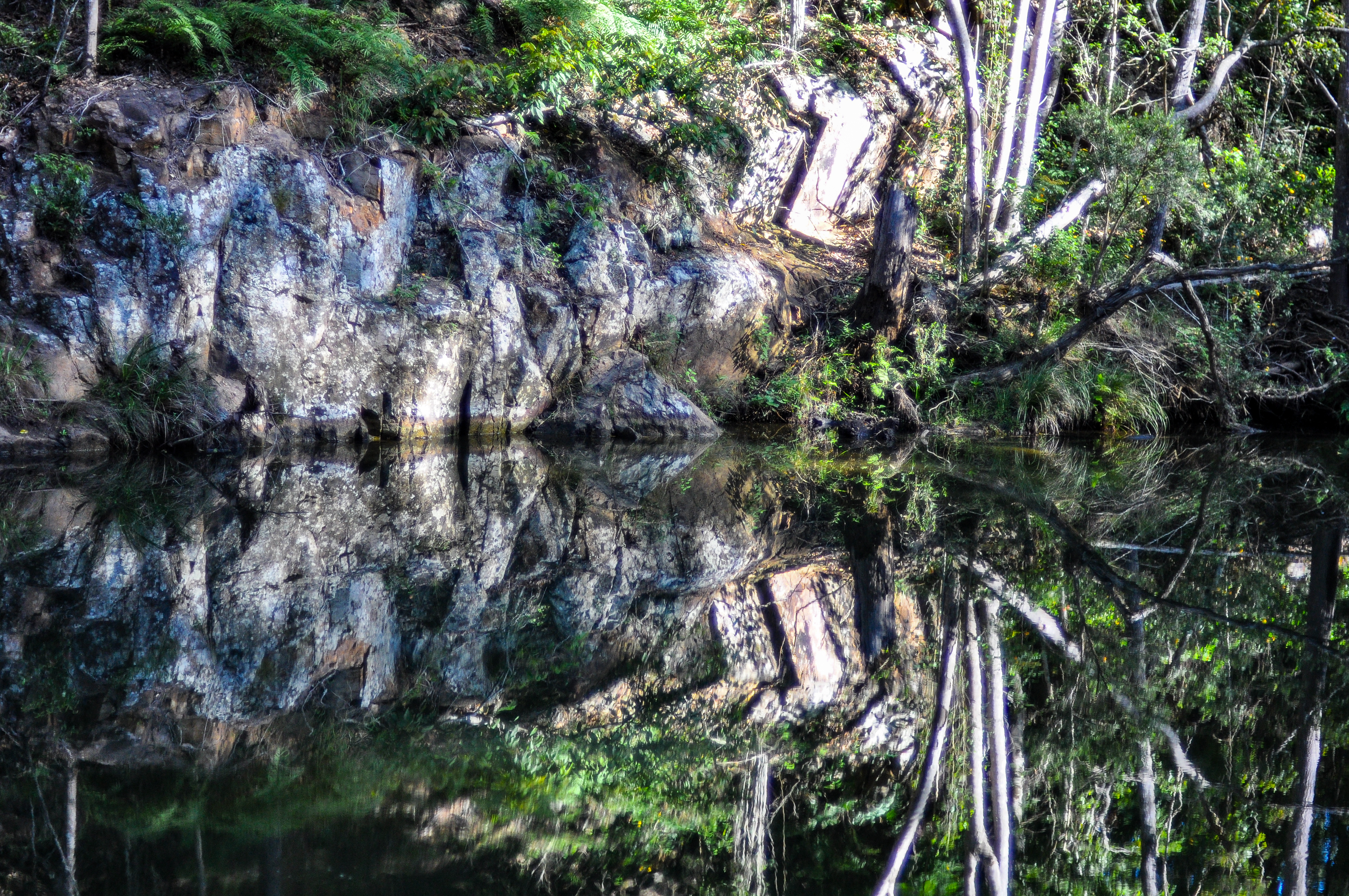
Water hole in D'Aguilar National Park

D'Aguilar National Park is a national park in Queensland, Australia. It contains the D'Aguilar Range and is located along the northwest of the Brisbane metropolitan area. The park is traversed by the winding scenic Mount Nebo Road and Mount Glorious Road.

The park contains eucalyptus woodlands, sheltered pockets of sub-tropical rainforest, a number of crevasses and views of Moreton Bay and the Glass House Mountains. The Walkabout Creek Visitor Centre is located at the edge of the park. There are two formal, vehicle accessible camping areas in the Mount Mee section and eight remote bush camping sites (accessible only by walking) in the southern D'Aguilar (formerly Brisbane Forest Park) section. Popular lookouts include Jolly's Lookout, Westridge Outlook, Camp Mountain Lookout and Wivenhoe Lookout, overlooking Lake Wivenhoe. The villages of Mount Nebo and Mount Glorious are located on Mount Nebo Road on the edges of the national park and are popular stops for tourists driving through the park.

The southern part of the park was formerly known as Brisbane Forest Park, while the northern part of the park is at Mount Mee.

== Flora ==
Woodlands and dry eucalypt forests predominate on the drier, shallower soils of the park's foothills. Spotted gum (Corymbia variegata) and narrow-leaved ironbark are two of the main species. There are also small areas of heath and ridges dominated by grass trees (Xanthorrhoea spp). Remnant pockets of lowland rainforest occur in the valleys along some of the watercourses.

At higher altitudes the forests become more complex due to the increased rainfall and generally deeper soils. These mid-altitude forests are dominated by grey gum, pink bloodwood and brush box. Occasional rainforest species are also present and there is a thick understorey of ferns, vines and shrubs.

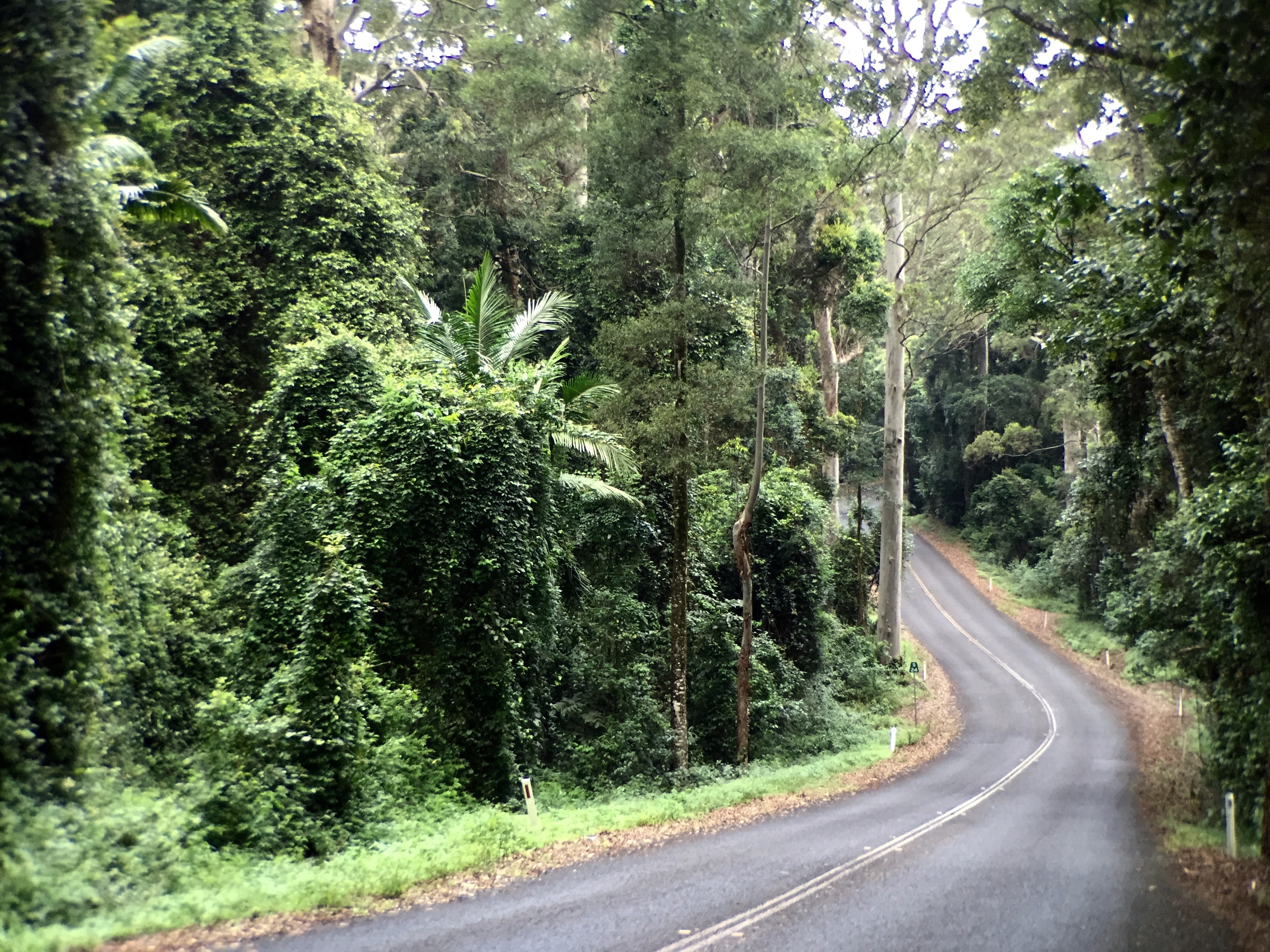
Mount Glorious Road, 2016

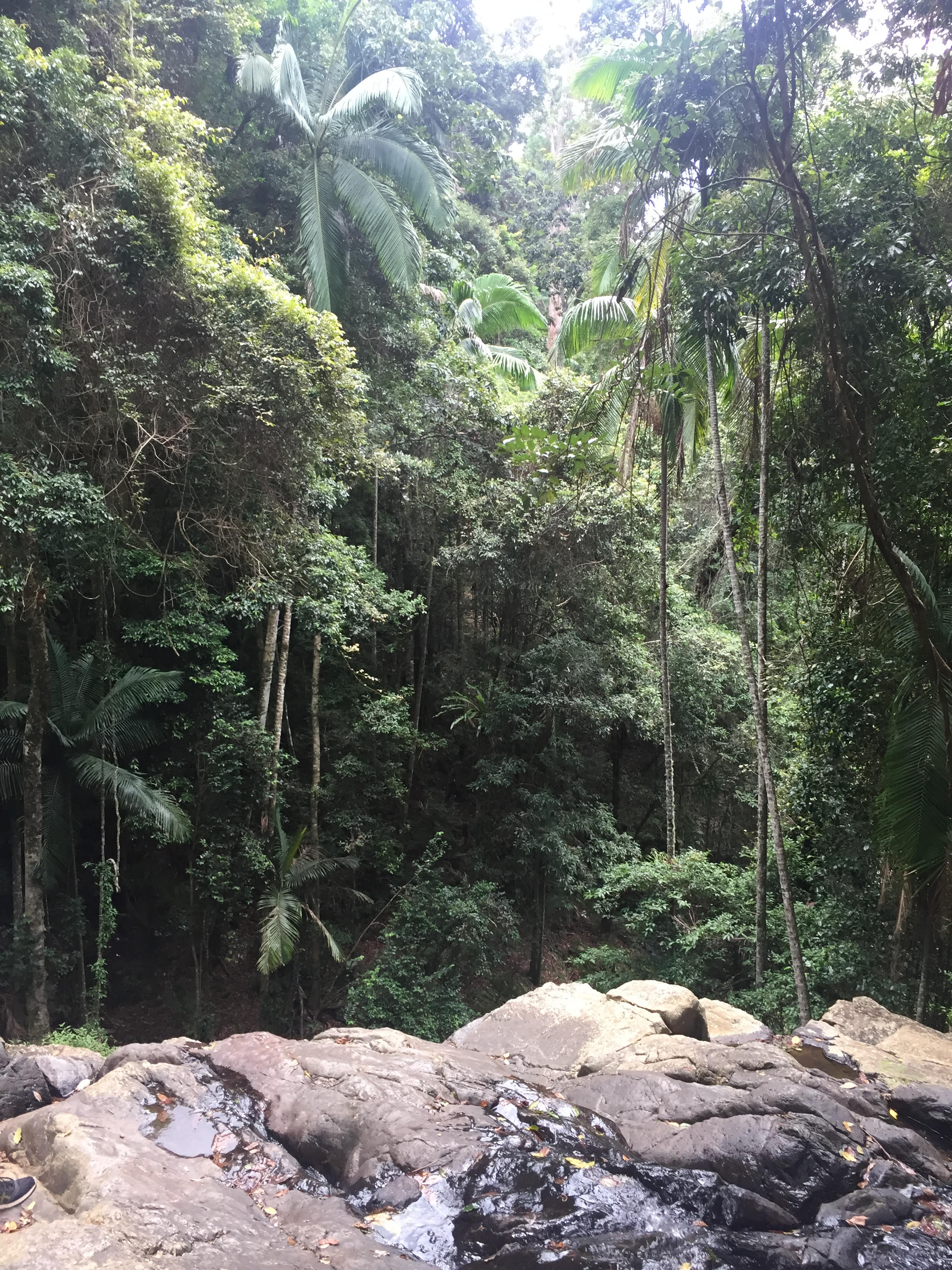
View from Greenes Falls, Mt Glorious

Moist sub-tropical rainforest grows on the highest parts of the range where the rainfall is two-thirds greater than in the foothills, particularly on the rich basaltic soils north of Mt Glorious. Huge strangler figs (Ficus watkinsiana) can be seen emerging through the canopy.

== Fauna ==
More than 240 species of birds have been recorded in the park, including the noisy pitta (Pitta versicolor), southern logrunner (Orthonyx temminckii), paradise riflebird (Ptiloris paradiseus), regent bowerbird (Sericulus chrysocephalus), satin bowerbird (Ptilonorhynchus violaceus), brush-turkey (Alectura lathami), laughing kookaburra (Dacelo novaeguineae), pied currawong (Strepera graculina), red goshawk (Erythrotriorchis radiatus), marbled frogmouth (Podargus ocellatus), bush-hen (Amaurornis olivacea), black-breasted button quail (Turnix melanogaster), white-bellied sea eagle (Haliaeetus leucogaster), comb-crested jacana (Irediparra gallinacea) and cotton pygmy goose (Nettapus coromandelianus).

66 mammal species have been recorded in the park, including the echidna (Tachyglossus aculeatus), platypus (Ornithorhynchus anatinus), red-necked pademelon (Thylogale thetis), short-eared possum (Trichosurus caninus), common ringtail possum (Pseudocheirus peregrinus), northern brown bandicoot (Isoodon macrourus), long-nosed bandicoot (Perameles nasuta), long-nosed potoroo (Potorous tridactylus), insectivorous bats, fruit bats ("flying foxes") (Pteropus spp.), several species of gliding possums and small numbers of koalas (Phascolarctos cinereus) and kangaroos.

There are a variety of reptile species in the park. This includes the tree goanna/lace monitor (Varanus varius), which is a large monitor lizard and the land mullet (Egernia major), which is a large, shiny black skink. 26 species of frogs have been recorded in the park, including the great barred frog (Mixophyes fasciolatus). The most common amphibian in the park is an introduced pest, the cane toad (Rhinella marina).

== See also ==
- Protected areas of Queensland
