= Ghost gum =

Ghost gum may refer to a number of Australian evergreen tree species including:

- Corymbia aparrerinja, a central Australian species
- Corymbia bella, a northern Australian species
- Corymbia blakei, an northeastern Australian species
- Corymbia dallachiana, an eastern Australian species
- Corymbia papuana, a northeastern Australian species
- Corymbia candida, a northwestern Australian species
- Corymbia dendromerinx, a northwestern Australian species
