= Spotted gum =

Spotted gum usually refers to the Australian tree species Corymbia maculata but may also refer to other closely related species within the genus Corymbia as follows:

- Corymbia citriodora (usually referred to as the lemon-scented gum)
- Corymbia henryi (large-leaved spotted gum)
- Corymbia maculata (spotted gum)
- Corymbia mannifera (mountain spotted gum or red spotted gum)
