= Illidgea epigramma =

Scientific classification
- Kingdom: Animalia
- Phylum: Arthropoda
- Clade: Pancrustacea
- Class: Insecta
- Order: Lepidoptera
- Family: Xyloryctidae
- Genus: Illidgea
- Species: I. epigramma

Binomial name
- Illidgea epigramma (Meyrick, 1890)

Synonyms
- Cryptophaga epigramma Meyrick, 1890; Cryptophaga confundens T. P. Lucas, 1902

Species of moth

Illidgea epigramma is a moth in the family Xyloryctidae. It was described by Edward Meyrick in 1890. It is found in Australia, where it has been recorded from the Australian Capital Territory, New South Wales, Queensland and South Australia.

The wingspan is 26–32 mm for males and 30–40 mm for females. The forewings are grey, more or less diffused with slaty-grey (and in some specimens sparingly with red coppery tint), with white scales, and richly and variously marked with rich black bars and lines. There is a rich black band at the base, more or less constant and becoming more definite and constant along the inner margin to one-fourth, a rich band from the middle of the base obliquely toward the costa, thinning out or suffusing with another from one-fourth to before half. There is also a band transversely from three-fifths of the costa to within one-fourth of the inner margin opposite half. Halfway between this line and the base of the wing is an irregular more or less parallel line, in some specimens stopping short, in others running irregularly to the inner margin, and in others one or two other irregular lines still nearer the base of the wing. A conspicuous wavy zigzag band is found from the costa to seven-eights of the inner margin prominently angled outwards before and over the middle, and then sending a line at an angle towards the base of the wing. A rich wide band of black is found along the median fold in some specimens, in others this is absent. There is a suffusion of white beyond the outer transverse line, shaded more or less towards the costa with slaty-grey, in some specimens absent, in others only as a lunar mark over the inner half of the wing. There is also a white zigzag subhindmarginal line becoming lost before the inner margin, and in many specimens altogether absent. The hindwings are fuscous, lighter towards the base.

The larvae feed on Eucalyptus maculata and Eucalyptus saligna. They bore in stem of their host plant.

== Additional works cited ==
- Turner, A. J. (1897). "The Xyloryctidæ of Queensland". Annals of the Queensland Museum. 4: 27.
