= Sour gum =

Sour gum can refer to:

- Black tupelo (Nyssa sylvatica), a medium-sized deciduous tree occasionally referred to as "sourgum".
- Water tupelo, a long-lived tupelo tree occasionally referred to as "sourgum".
- Sour gum, a sour type of chewing gum.

== See also ==
- Gum tree
