= Acacia dichromotricha =

Scientific classification
- Kingdom: Plantae
- Clade: Tracheophytes
- Clade: Angiosperms
- Clade: Eudicots
- Clade: Rosids
- Order: Fabales
- Family: Fabaceae
- Subfamily: Caesalpinioideae
- Clade: Mimosoid clade
- Genus: Acacia
- Species: A. dichromotricha

Binomial name
- Acacia dichromotricha Pedley

Species of legume

Acacia dichromotricha is a species of flowering plant in the family Fabaceae and is endemic to central western Queensland, Australia. It is a tree with furrowed bark, slightly to strongly curved phyllodes, spikes of pale yellow or white flowers and glabrous, crusty pods.

== Description ==
Acacia dichromotricha is a tree that typically grows to a height of 4–10 m (13–33 ft), its main stems often gnarled and fluted, with furrowed bark. Its branchlets have white hairs pressed against the surface, but soon become glabrous, the new shoots with silky lemony hairs at first. The phyllodes are slightly to strongly curved downwards, 70–120 mm (2.8–4.7 in) long and 4–8 mm (0.16–0.31 in) wide, with 14 or 15 veins per millimetre, sometimes with up to three more prominent veins. There is a gland up to 2.5 mm (0.098 in) above the base of the phyllodes. The flowers are borne in interrupted spikes or in short racemes 1–4 mm (0.039–0.157 in) long and are golden yellow. Flowering has been observed in May and June, and the pod valves are narrowly oblong, 60–80 mm (2.4–3.1 in) long, 6–7 mm (0.24–0.28 in) wide, moderately curved and not constricted between the seeds.

== Taxonomy ==
Acacia dichromotricha was first formally described in 2019 by Leslie Pedley in the journal Austrobaileya from specimens collected 15 km (9.3 mi) north of Winton in 1999. The specific epithet (dichromotricha) means 'two-coloured hairs', alluding to the hairs on young branchlets being white and those of the flowers are golden yellow.

== Distribution and habitat ==
This species of wattle grows in reddish soil on lateritic plateaus in open woodland dominated by various wattle species or Corymbia blakei and numerous shrub species of Dodonaea and Eremophila. It occurs in central-western Queensland from near Winton and south to between Quilpie and Windorah.

== Conservation status ==
Acacia dichromotricha is listed as of "least concern" under the Queensland Government Nature Conservation Act 1992.

== See also ==
- List of Acacia species
