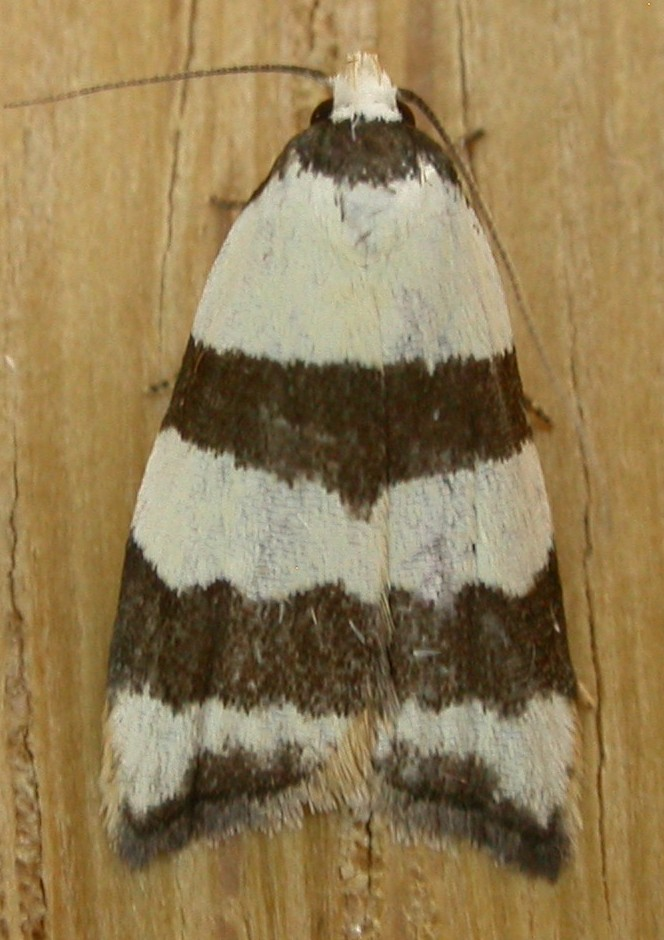

Scientific classification
- Kingdom: Animalia
- Phylum: Arthropoda
- Class: Insecta
- Order: Lepidoptera
- Family: Oecophoridae
- Genus: Zonopetala
- Species: Z. clerota

Binomial name
- Zonopetala clerota Meyrick, 1883

= Zonopetala clerota =

Species of moth

Zonopetala clerota is a moth of the family Oecophoridae. It is found in Australia.

The caterpillar feeds on the leaves of gum trees and the adult moth has a wingspan of 2 cm (0.79 in).
