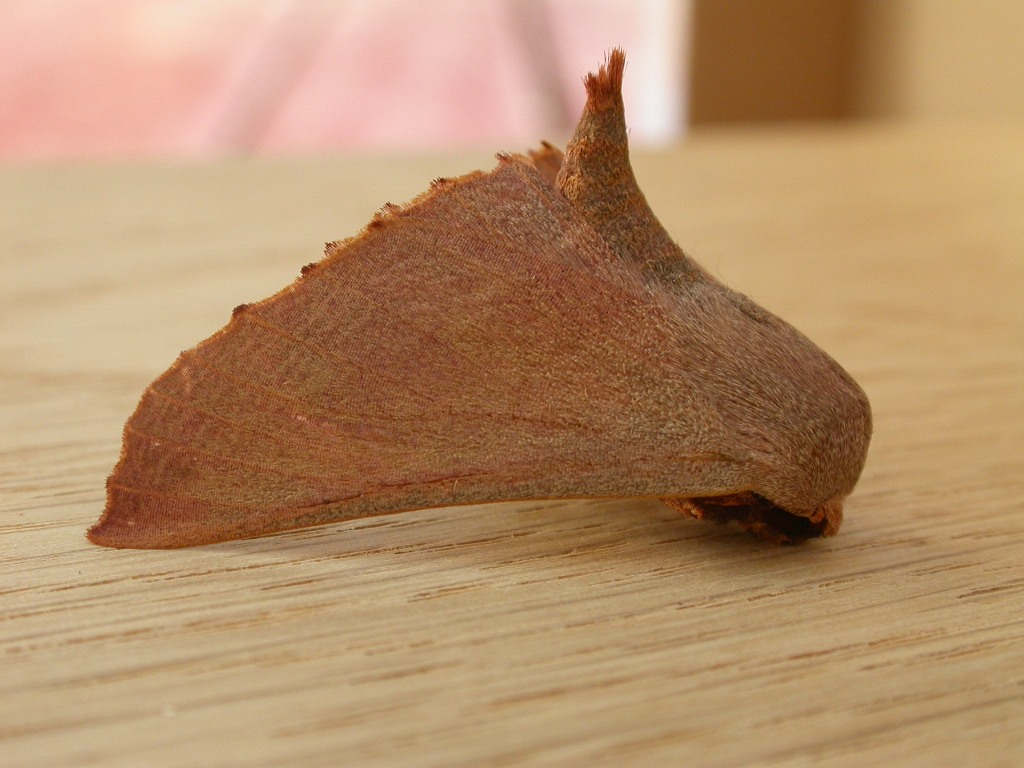

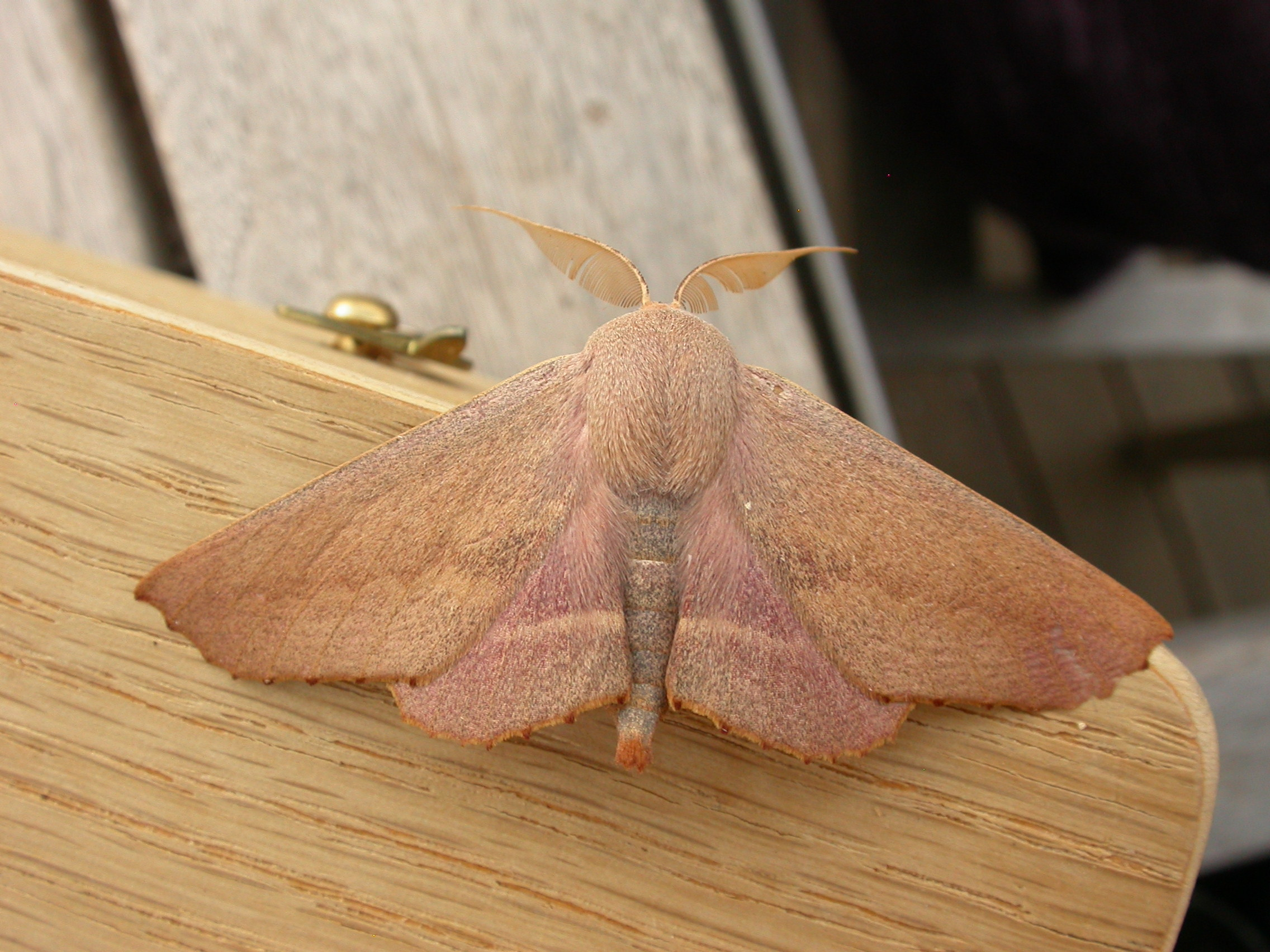

Scientific classification
- Domain: Eukaryota
- Kingdom: Animalia
- Phylum: Arthropoda
- Class: Insecta
- Order: Lepidoptera
- Family: Geometridae
- Genus: Monoctenia
- Species: M. smerintharia

Binomial name
- Monoctenia smerintharia R. Felder & Rogenhofer, 1875

= Monoctenia smerintharia =

Species of moth

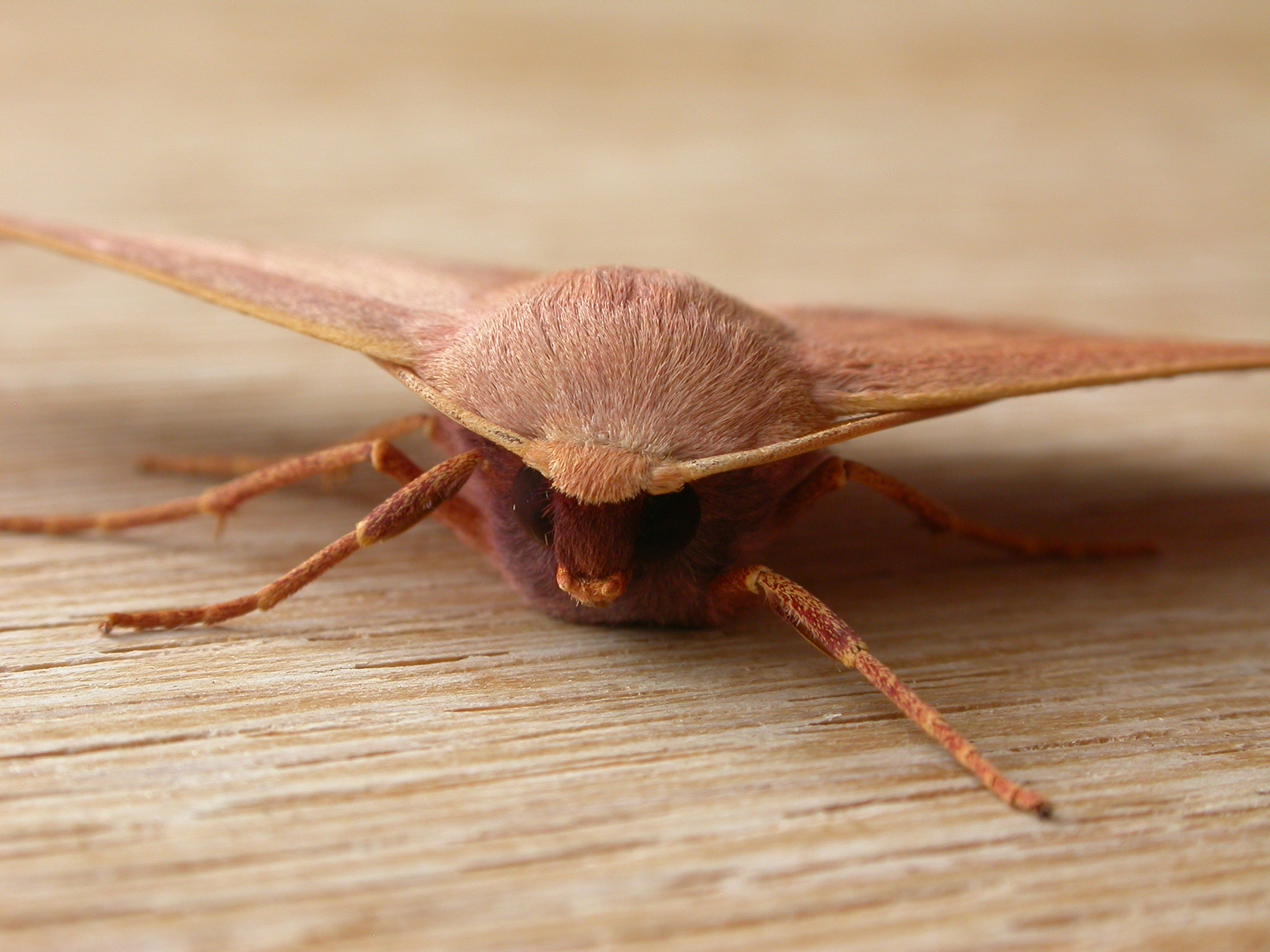

Monoctenia smerintharia, more commonly known as the dark leaf moth, is a moth of the family Geometridae first described by Rudolf Felder and Alois Friedrich Rogenhofer in 1875. It is found in Australia. The larvae feed on the leaves of gum trees.
