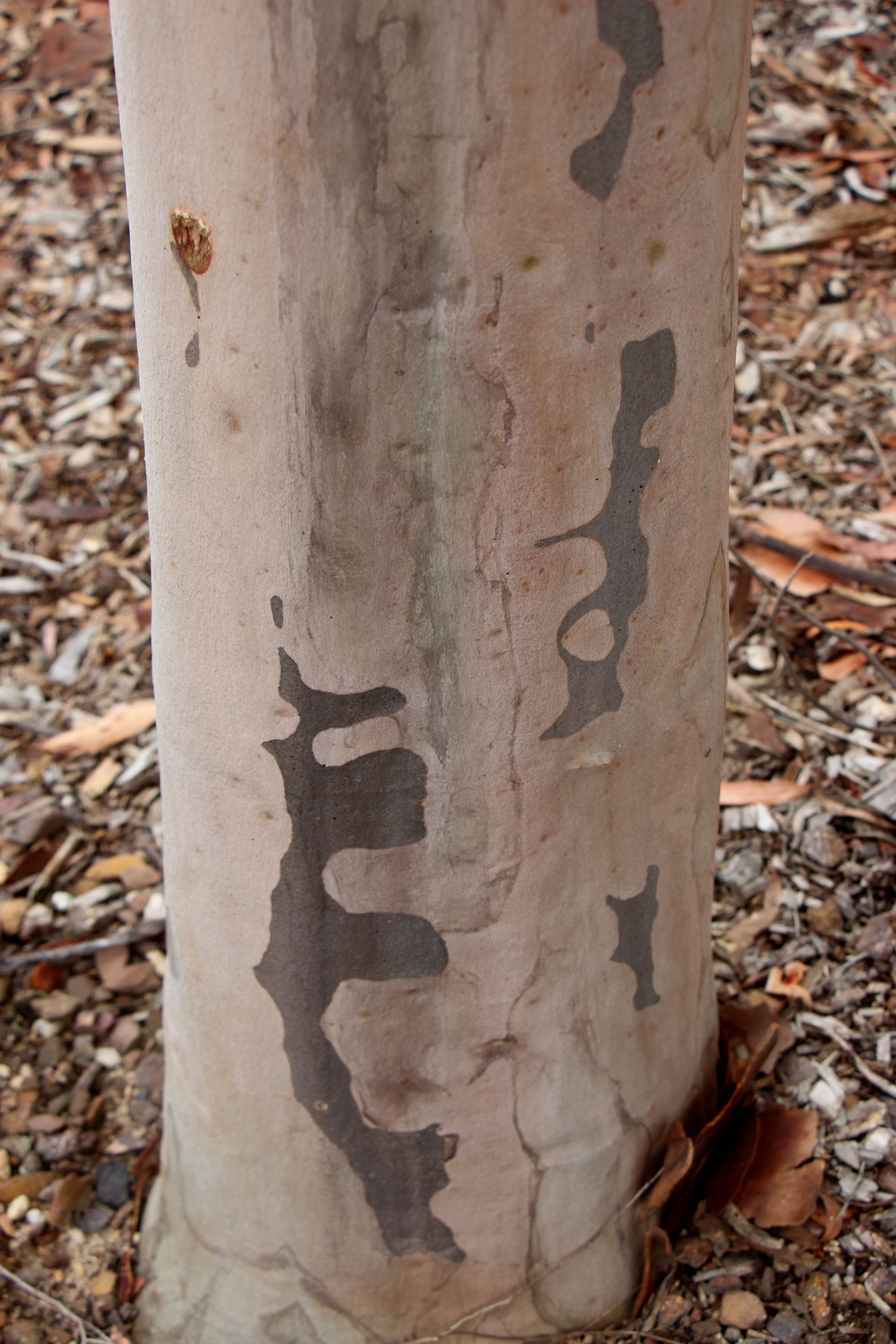

Scientific classification
- Kingdom: Plantae
- Clade: Tracheophytes
- Clade: Angiosperms
- Clade: Eudicots
- Clade: Rosids
- Order: Myrtales
- Family: Myrtaceae
- Genus: Corymbia
- Species: C. variegata

Binomial name
- Corymbia variegata (F.Muell.) K.D.Hill & L.A.S.Johnson

Synonyms
- Eucalyptus variegata F.Muell.

= Corymbia variegata =

Species of tree

Corymbia variegata is a tree found in eastern Australia belonging to the Myrtaceae family. It occurs in northeastern New South Wales from around Coffs Harbour to near Monto and the Carnarvon Range in Queensland. Usually seen in open forest on soils of medium fertility, often in hilly country. A member of the spotted gum complex of trees, it grows up to 50 metres tall.

As of September 2021, Plants of the World Online treats the species as synonymous with Corymbia citriodora.

== See also ==
- Corymbia maculata
- Corymbia henryi
- Corymbia torelliana
