= Illidgea aethalodes =

Scientific classification
- Kingdom: Animalia
- Phylum: Arthropoda
- Class: Insecta
- Order: Lepidoptera
- Family: Xyloryctidae
- Genus: Illidgea
- Species: I. aethalodes

Binomial name
- Illidgea aethalodes Turner, 1902

Species of moth

Illidgea aethalodes is a moth in the family Xyloryctidae. It was described by Alfred Jefferis Turner in 1902. It is found in Australia, where it has been recorded from the Northern Territory and Queensland.

The wingspan is 22–26 mm. The forewings are dark grey mixed with whitish, and with black markings. There is a strong line from the base of the costa, along the basal part of the inner margin, as well as a fine transverse streak from the costa before the middle, not reaching the inner margin. This is preceded by two shorter streaks from the costa, which are connected in the disc with each other and with the basal line. An inwardly oblique streak is found from the costa at three-fourths, rather broad on the costa, narrowing, and reaching to little beyond the middle of the disc. There is also a fine erect streak, succeeded by a white shade, from before the anal angle, bent slightly outwards in the disc, so that it passes well posteriorly to the costal streak. Some fine blackish lines are found on the posterior veins and there is a fine blackish hindmarginal line. The hindwings are grey, in males whitish towards the base, but in females wholly grey.
