= Illidgea =

Scientific classification
- Kingdom: Animalia
- Phylum: Arthropoda
- Class: Insecta
- Order: Lepidoptera
- Family: Xyloryctidae
- Genus: Illidgea; Turner, 1898

Type species
- Cryptophaga epigramma Meyrick, 1890

Moth genus in family Xyloryctidae

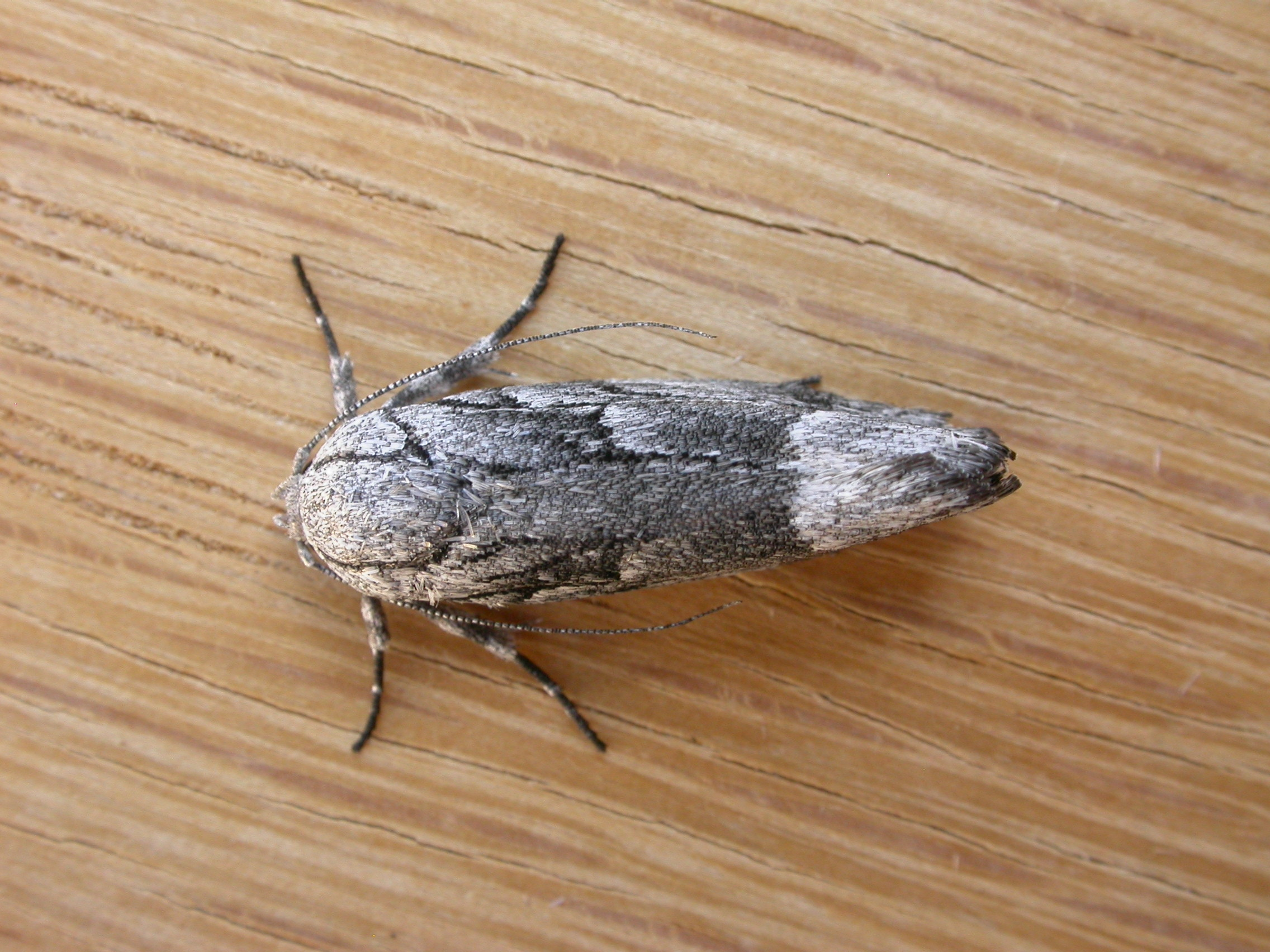
Illidgea, undescribed

Illidgea is a genus of moths of the family Xyloryctidae.

== Species ==
- Illidgea aethalodes Turner, 1902
- Illidgea epigramma (Meyrick, 1890)
