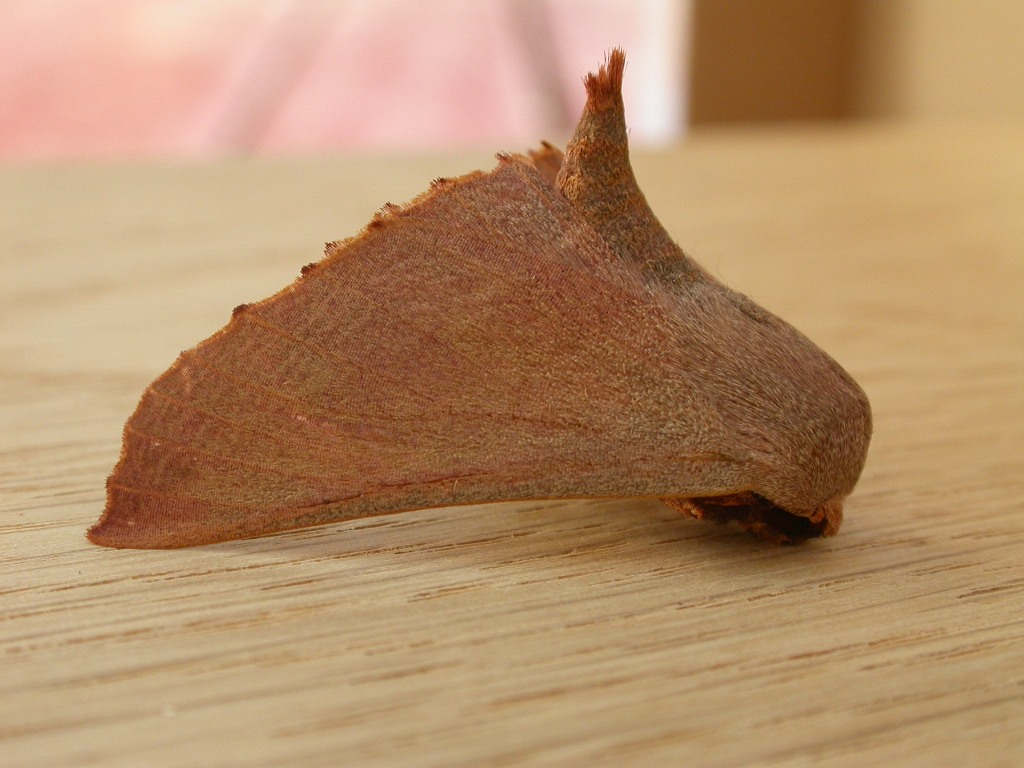
- Monoctenia smerintharia

Scientific classification
- Kingdom: Animalia
- Phylum: Arthropoda
- Class: Insecta
- Order: Lepidoptera
- Family: Geometridae
- Subfamily: Oenochrominae
- Genus: Monoctenia; Guenée, 1857

= Monoctenia =

Genus of moths

Monoctenia is a genus of moths in the family Geometridae erected by Achille Guenée in 1857. All species are found in Australia.

== Species ==
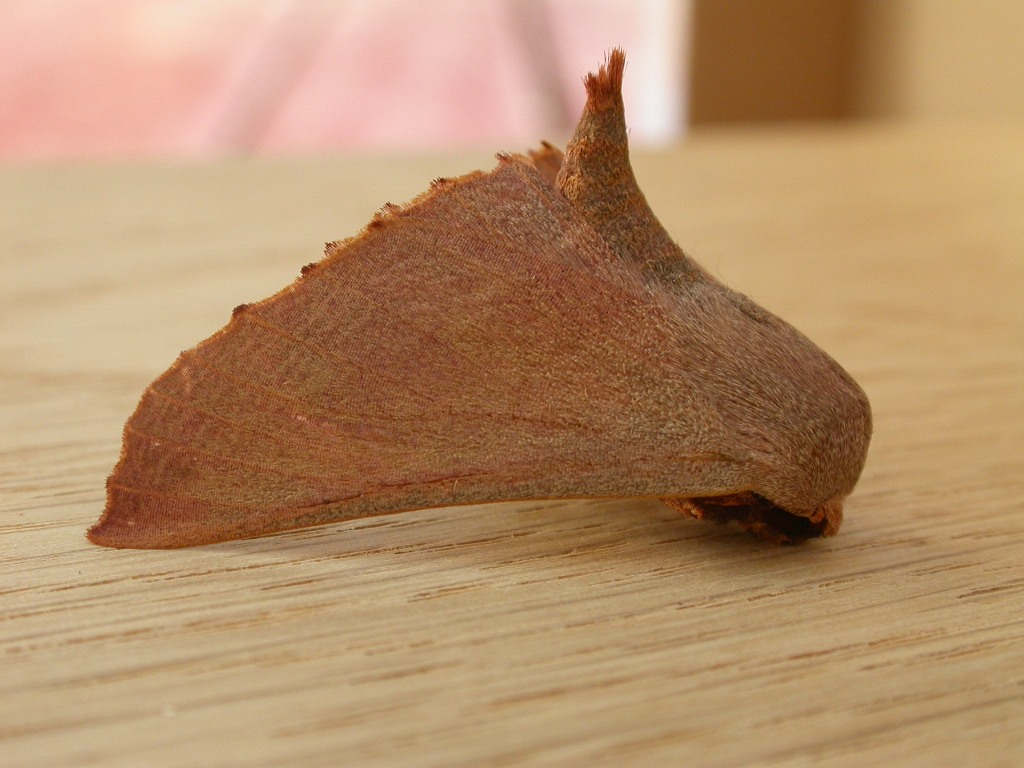
Monoctenia smerintharia

- Monoctenia smerintharia R. Felder & Rogenhofer, 1875
- Monoctenia falernaria Guenée, 1857
