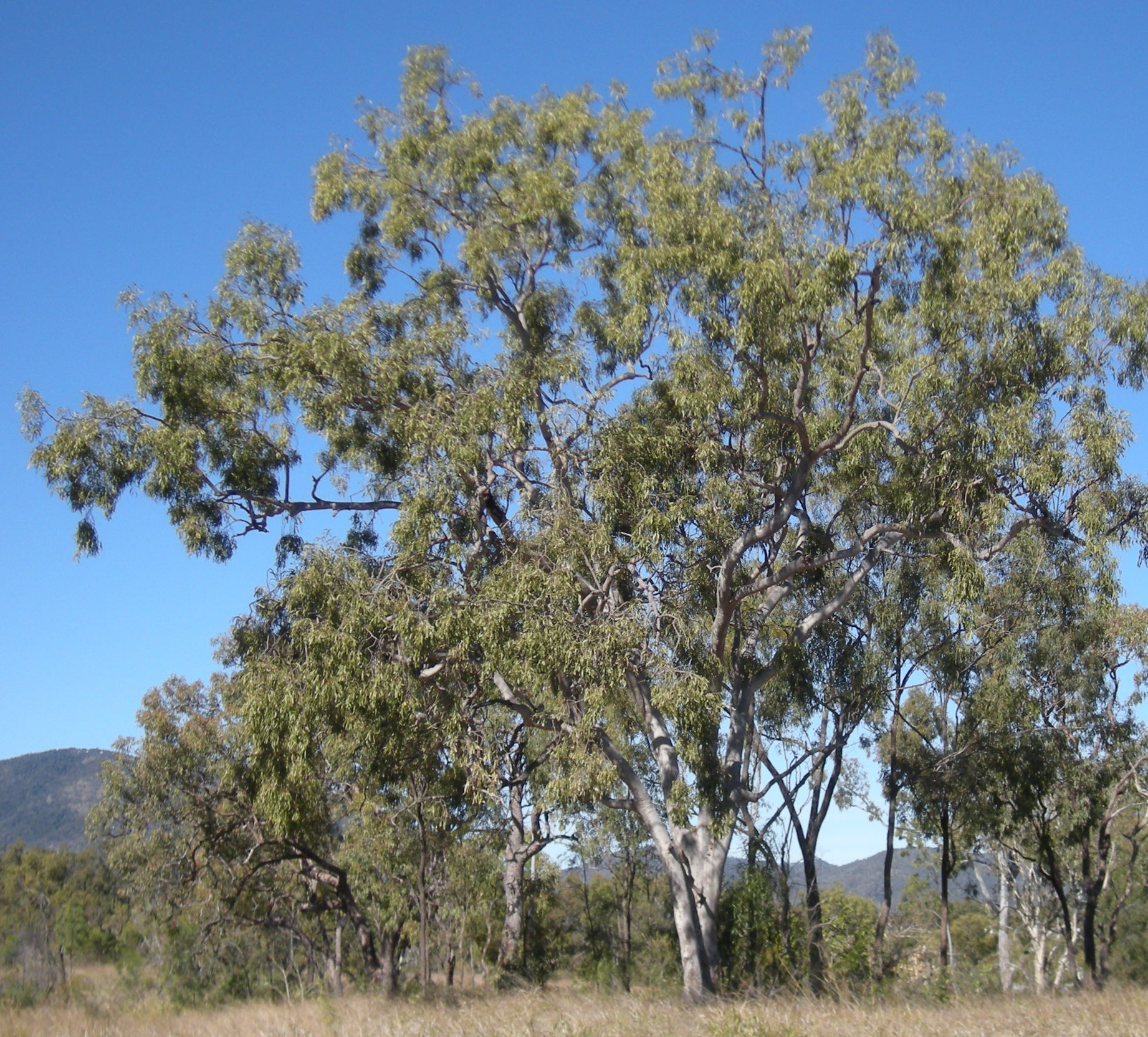
- In coastal Central Queensland

Scientific classification
- Kingdom: Plantae
- Clade: Tracheophytes
- Clade: Angiosperms
- Clade: Eudicots
- Clade: Rosids
- Order: Myrtales
- Family: Myrtaceae
- Genus: Corymbia
- Species: C. dallachiana

Binomial name
- Corymbia dallachiana (Benth.) K.D.Hill & L.A.S.Johnson

Synonyms
- Eucalyptus clavigera var. dallachiana (Benth.) Maiden; Eucalyptus tesselaris var. dallachiana Benth. orth. var.; Eucalyptus tesselaris var. dallachyana Domin orth. var.; Eucalyptus tessellaris var. dallachiana Benth.; Eucalyptus papuana auct. non F.Muell.

= Corymbia dallachiana =

Dallachy's ghost gum

Species of plant

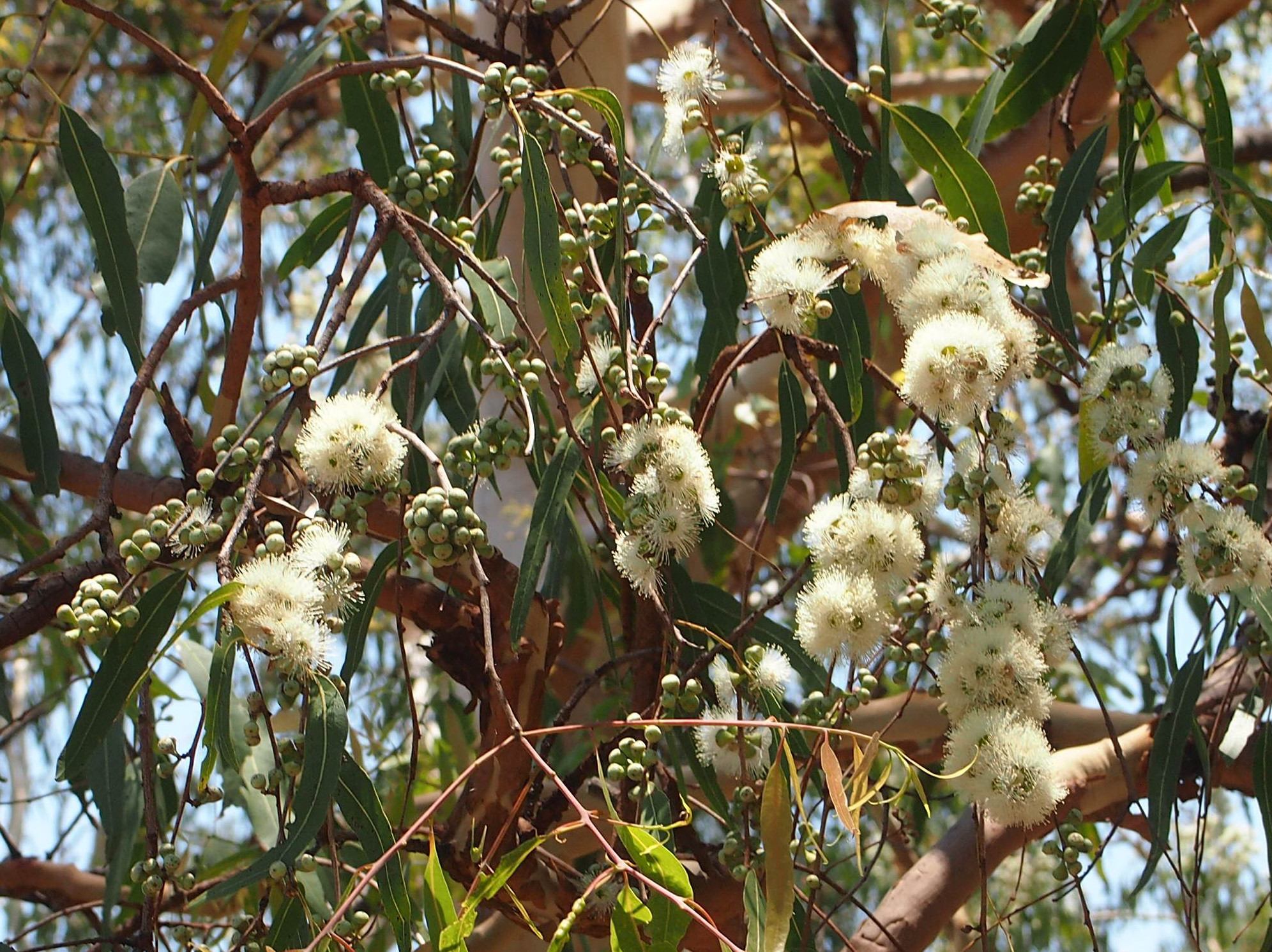
Buds and flowers

Corymbia dallachiana commonly known as Dallachy's ghost gum or Dallachy's gum, is a species of tree that is endemic to Queensland. It has smooth bark, lance-shaped or curved adult leaves, flower buds usually in groups of three, white flowers and cup-shaped, cylindrical or barrel-shaped fruit.

== Description ==
Corymbia dallachiana is a tree that typically grows to a height of 15 m (49 ft), sometimes more, and forms a lignotuber. It has smooth white to cream-coloured and pinkish bark that is shed in thin patches. Sometimes there is a short stocking of rough grey bark at the base of the trunk. Young plants and coppice regrowth have leathery elliptical, later egg-shaped to lance-shaped leaves that are 100–260 mm (3.9–10.2 in) long, 35–150 mm (1.4–5.9 in) wide and petiolate. Adult leaves are the same shade of green on both sides, lance-shaped or curved, 93–270 mm (3.7–10.6 in) long and 9–34 mm (0.35–1.34 in) wide, tapering to a petiole 12–38 mm (0.47–1.50 in) long. The flower buds are arranged in leaf axils on a branched peduncle up to 3 mm (0.12 in) long, each branch of the peduncle usually with three buds on pedicels 1–6 mm (0.04–0.24 in) long. Mature buds are pear-shaped, 5–7 mm (0.20–0.28 in) long and 4–6 mm (0.16–0.24 in) wide with a rounded operculum. Flowering has been observed in November and December and the flowers are white. The fruit is a woody cup-shaped, cylindrical or barrel-shaped capsule 9–13 mm (0.35–0.51 in) long and 7–10 mm (0.28–0.39 in) wide with the valves enclosed in the fruit or at rim level.

== Taxonomy and naming ==
Dallachy's ghost gum was first formally described in 1867 by George Bentham, who gave it the name Eucalyptus tessellaris var. dallachiana and published the description in Flora Australiensis. In 1995 Kenneth Hill and Lawrence Alexander Sidney Johnson raised the variety to species status as Corymbia dallachiana in the journal Telopea. The specific epithet dallachiana honours John Dallachy.

== Distribution and habitat ==
Corymbia dallachiana grows in grassy woodland on plains and on creek levees east of a line from Coen to Jericho and south from Bathurst Bay to Rockhampton and Emerald.

== Conservation status ==
This eucalypt is classified as of "least concern" under the Queensland Government Nature Conservation Act 1992.
