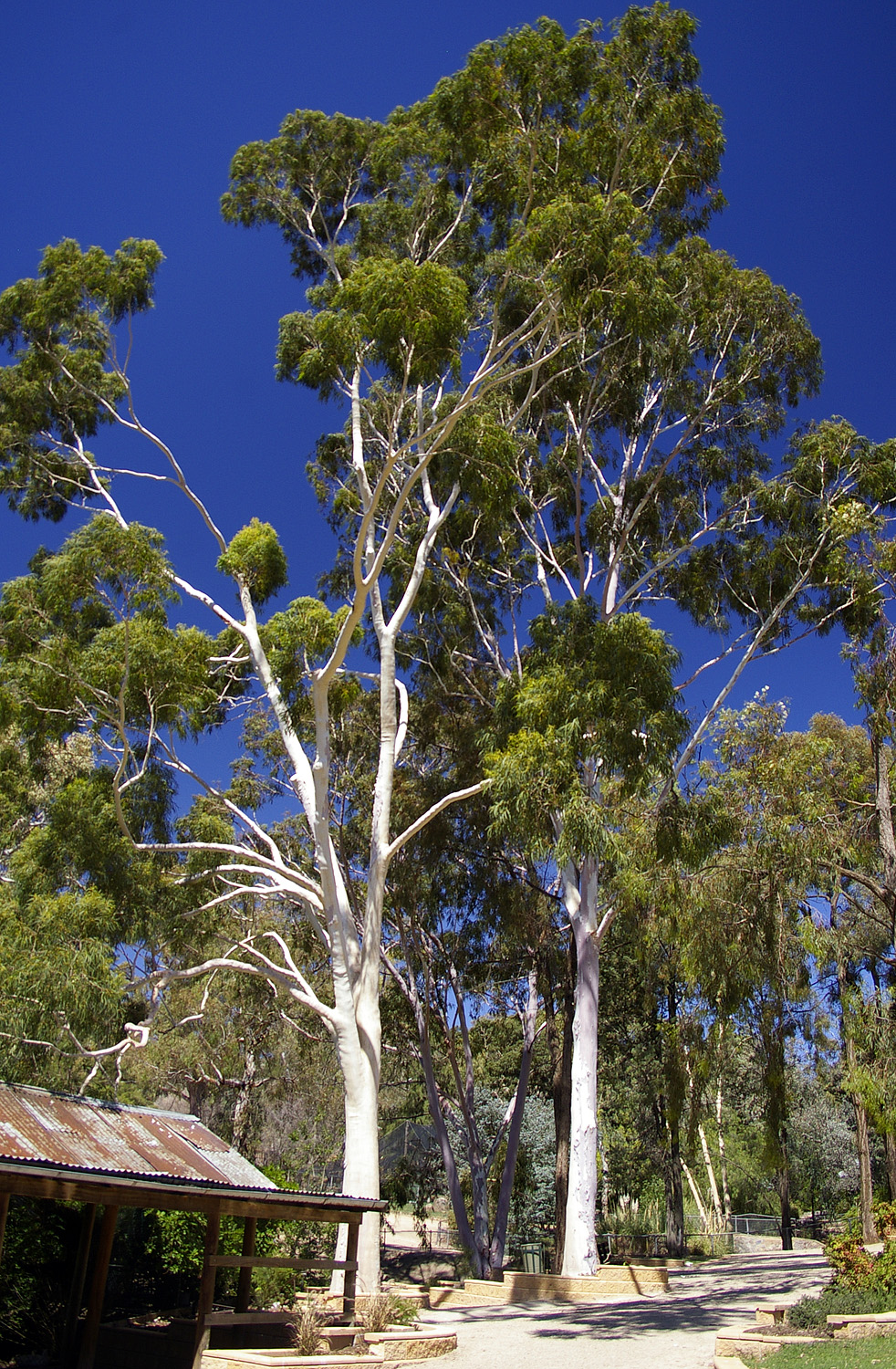
- In Wagga Wagga Botanic Gardens

Conservation status
- Least Concern (IUCN 3.1)

Scientific classification
- Kingdom: Plantae
- Clade: Tracheophytes
- Clade: Angiosperms
- Clade: Eudicots
- Clade: Rosids
- Order: Myrtales
- Family: Myrtaceae
- Genus: Corymbia
- Species: C. citriodora

Binomial name
- Corymbia citriodora (Hook.) K.D. Hill & L.A.S.Johnson

Synonyms
- List: Corymbia citriodora (Hook.) K.D.Hill & L.A.S.Johnson subsp. citriodora; Corymbia citriodora subsp. variegata (F.Muell.) A.R.Bean & M.W.McDonald; Corymbia variegata (F.Muell.) K.D.Hill & L.A.S.Johnson; Eucalyptus citriodora Hook.; Eucalyptus maculata var. citriodora F.M.Bailey nom. illeg.; Eucalyptus maculata var. citriodora Kinney nom. inval., nom. nud.; Eucalyptus maculata var. citriodora (Hook.) F.M.Bailey; Eucalyptus melissiodora Lindl.; Eucalyptus variegata F.Muell.

= Corymbia citriodora =

Lemon-scented gum

Species of plant

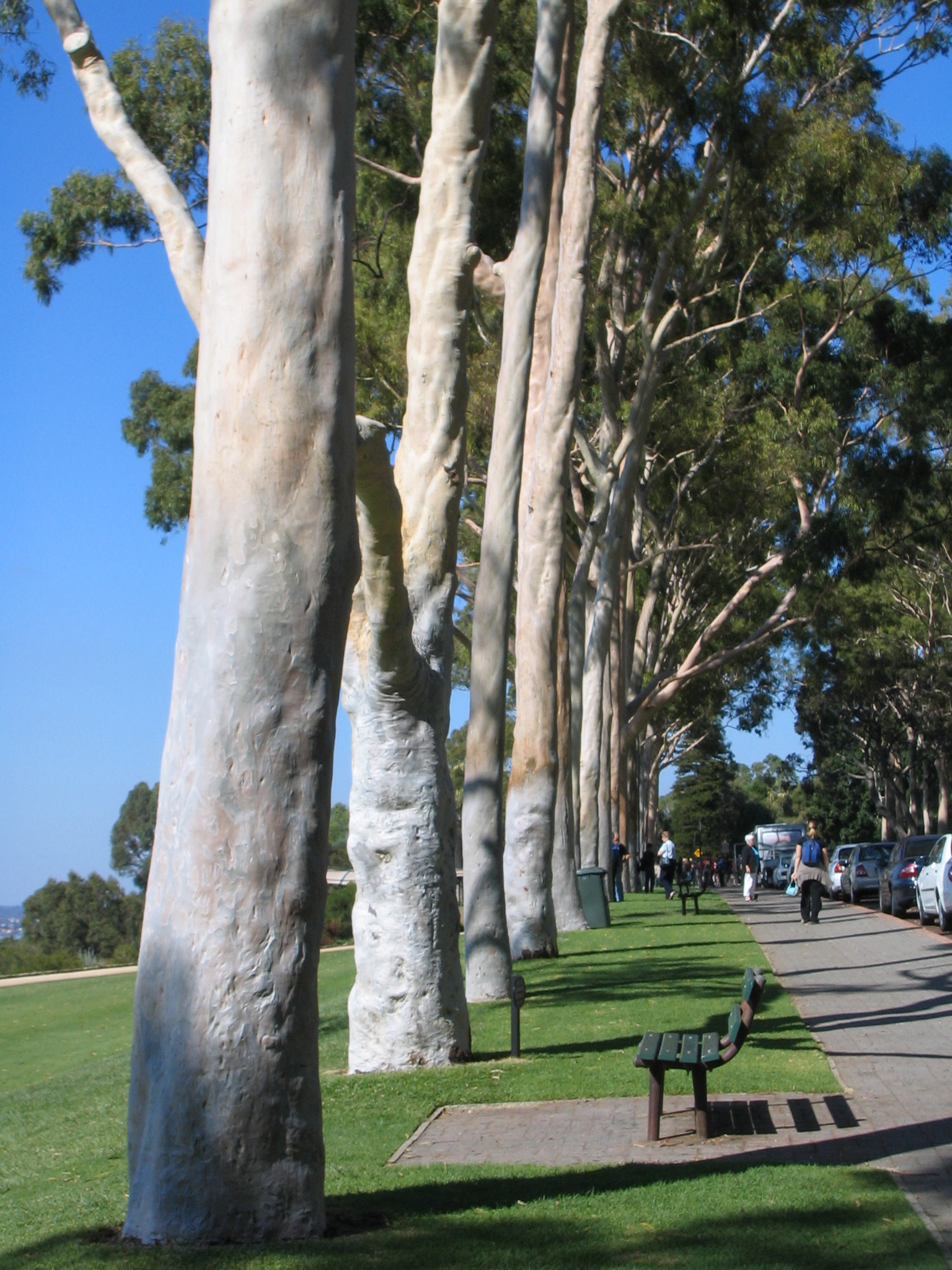
An avenue of lemon-scented gums in Kings Park, Perth, Western Australia

Corymbia citriodora, commonly known as lemon-scented gum and other common names, is a species of tall tree that is endemic to north-eastern Australia. It has smooth white to pink bark, narrow lance-shaped to curved adult leaves, flower buds in groups of three, white flowers and urn-shaped or barrel-shaped fruit.

== Description ==
Corymbia citriodora is a tree that typically grows to a height of 25–40 m (82–131 ft), sometimes to 50 m (160 ft) and forms a lignotuber. It has smooth, pale, uniform or slightly mottled, white to pink or coppery bark that is shed in thin flakes. Young plants and coppice regrowth have egg-shaped to lance-shaped leaves that are 80–210 mm (3.1–8.3 in) long and 32–80 mm (1.3–3.1 in) wide. Adult leaves are the same shade of glossy green on both sides, often lemon-scented when crushed, narrow lance-shaped to curved, 100–230 mm (3.9–9.1 in) long and 6–28 mm (0.24–1.10 in) wide tapering to a petiole 10–25 mm (0.4–1.0 in) long. The flower buds are borne in leaf axils on a branched peduncle 3–10 mm (0.1–0.4 in) long, each branch with three buds on pedicels 1–6 mm (0.04–0.24 in) long. Mature buds are oval to pear-shaped, 6–10 mm (0.24–0.39 in) long and 5–7 mm (0.20–0.28 in) wide with a rounded, conical or slightly beaked operculum. Flowering occurs in most months and the flowers are white. The fruit is a woody urn-shaped or barrel-shaped capsule 8–15 mm (0.31–0.59 in) long and 7–12 mm (0.28–0.47 in) wide with the valves enclosed in the fruit.

== Taxonomy and naming ==
Lemon-scented gum was first formally described in 1848 by William Jackson Hooker, who gave it the name Eucalyptus citriodora in Thomas Mitchell's Journal of an Expedition into the Interior of Tropical Australia. In 1995 Ken Hill and Lawrie Johnson changed the name from Eucalyptus citriodora to Corymbia citriodora. The specific epithet (citriodora) is Latin, meaning 'lemon-scented'.

Lemon-scented gum is also commonly known as citron-scented gum, lemon gum, spotted gum and lemon eucalyptus.

Corymbia citriodora is similar to C. maculata and C. henryi.

Some naturalists and conservationists do not recognise the genus Corymbia and still categorise its species within Eucalyptus.

== Distribution and habitat ==
Corymbia citriodora grows in undulating country in open forest and woodland in several disjunct areas in Queensland and as far south as Coffs Harbour in New South Wales. In Queensland it is found as far north as Lakeland Downs and Cooktown and as far inland as Hughenden and Chinchilla.

Kings Park in Perth has an avenue of this species planted many years ago, but the species has spread to become an environmental weed in the Sydney and Blue Mountains region in New South Wales and in open woodland areas in the south-west of Western Australia.

== Essential oil ==
The essential oil of the lemon-scented gum mainly consists of citronellal (80%), produced largely in Brazil and China. The unrefined oil is used in perfumery, and a refined form of this oil is used in insect repellents, especially against mosquitoes. The refined oil's citronellal content is turned into cis- and trans- isomers of p-menthane-3,8-diol (PMD), a process which occurs naturally as the eucalyptus leaves age. This refined oil, which includes related compounds from the essential corymbia citriodora, is known widely by its registered tradename, "Citrepel" or "Citriodiol", but also by generic names which vary by region: "oil of lemon eucalyptus" or "OLE" (USA); "PMD rich botanic oil" or "PMDRBO" (Europe); "PMD and related oil of lemon eucalyptus compounds" (Canada); Extract of Lemon Eucalyptus (Australia). Pure PMD is synthesized for commercial production from synthetic citronellal. Essential oil refined from the leaves of the tree can contain up to 98% citronella content. The aroma of the essential oil is described as "fresh, rose, citronella, balsamic, floral".

A study comparing mosquito repellents found that products using the oil of lemon eucalyptus were effective at driving mosquitos away from a human hand.

Features of the lemon-scented gum (Corymbia citriodora)

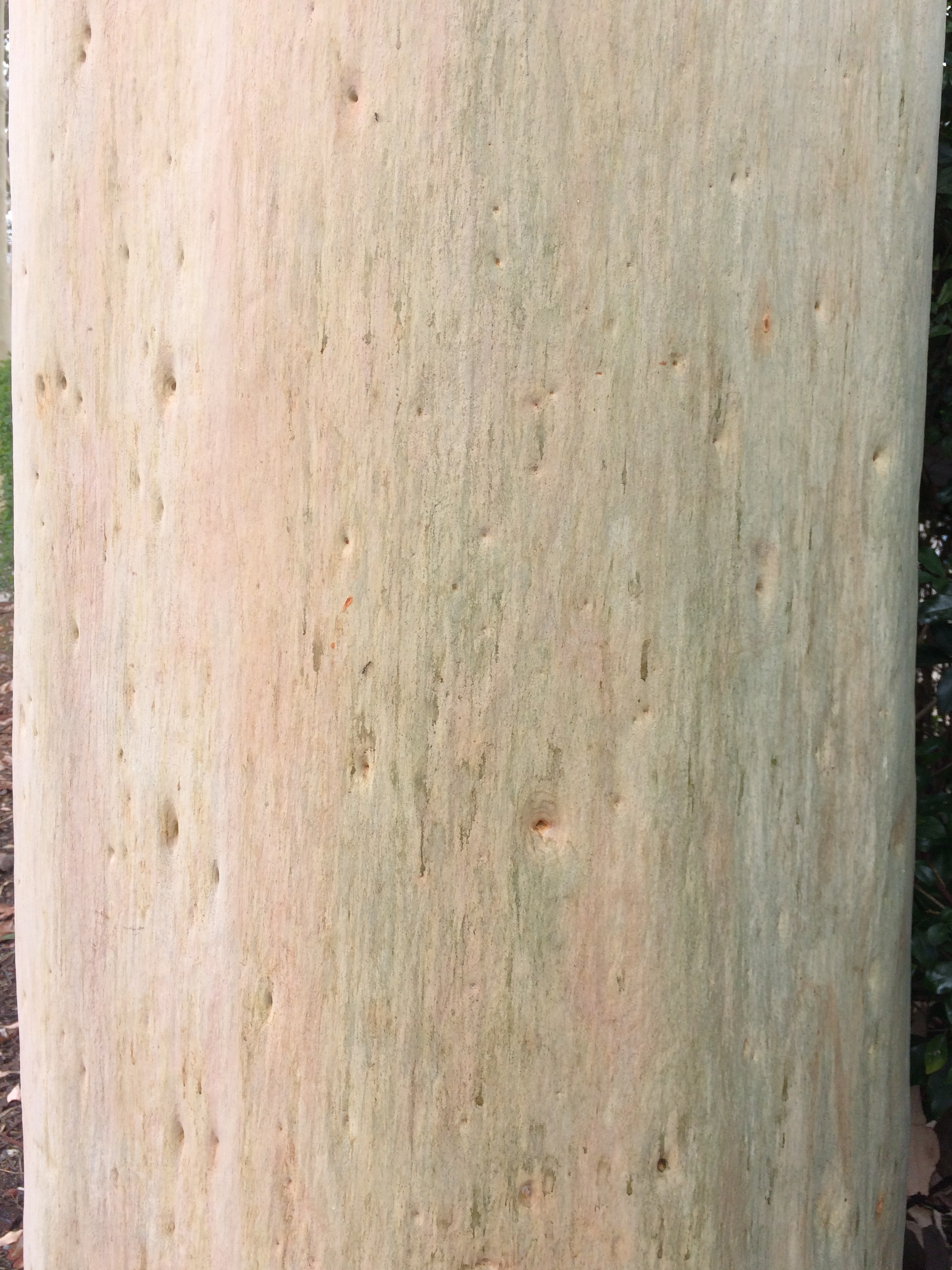
Bark

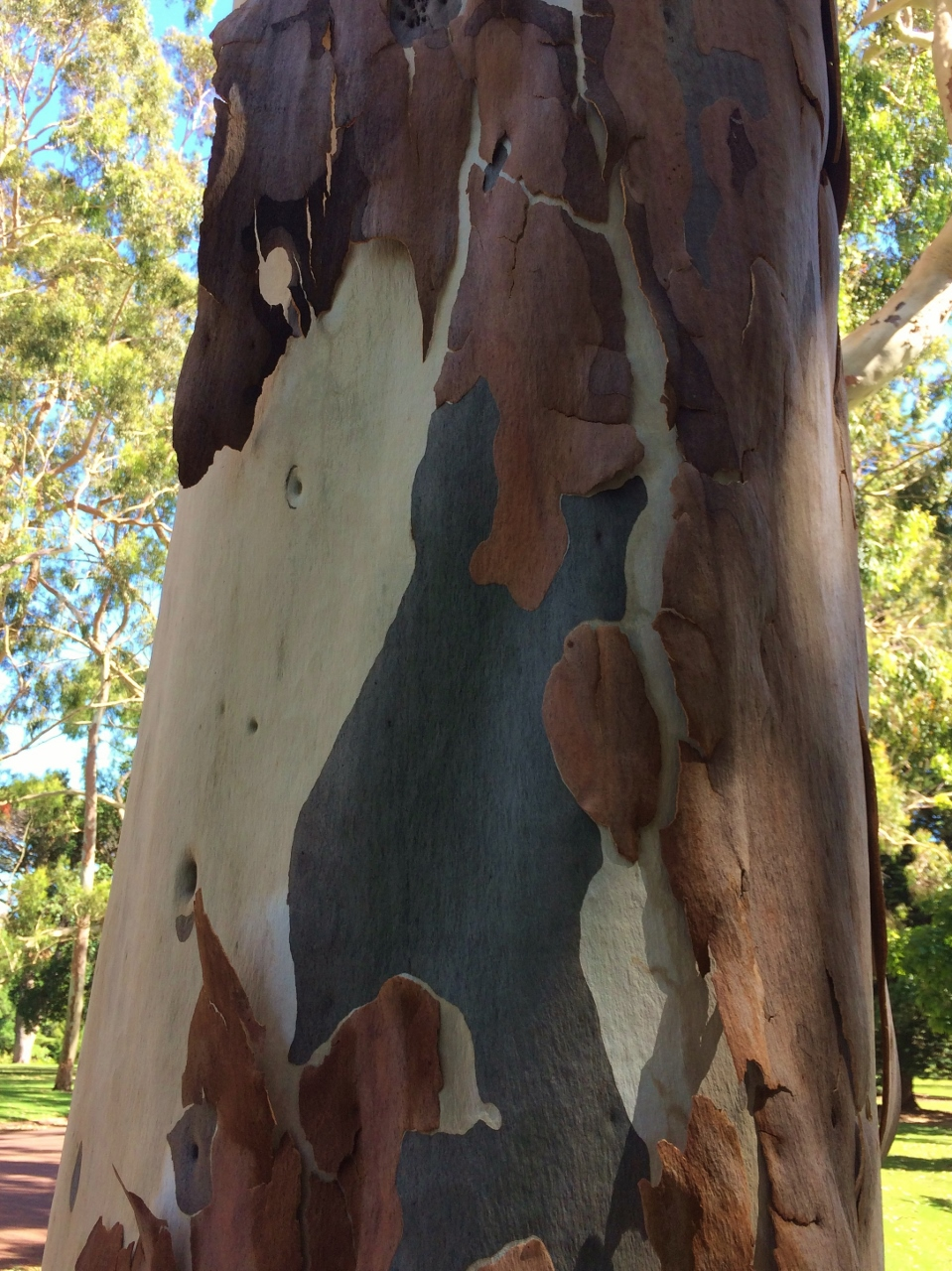
Shedding trunk bark

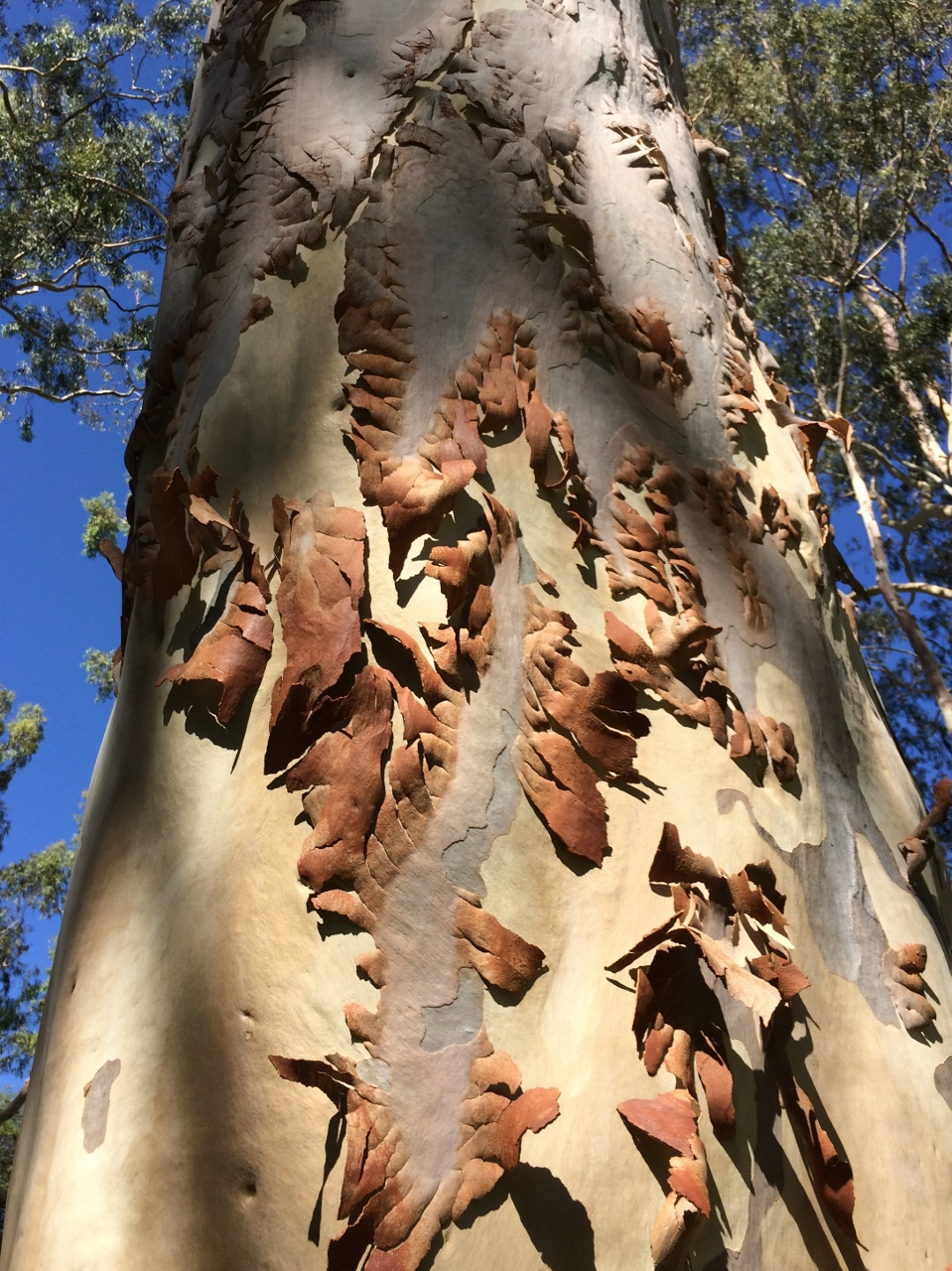
Shedding trunk bark

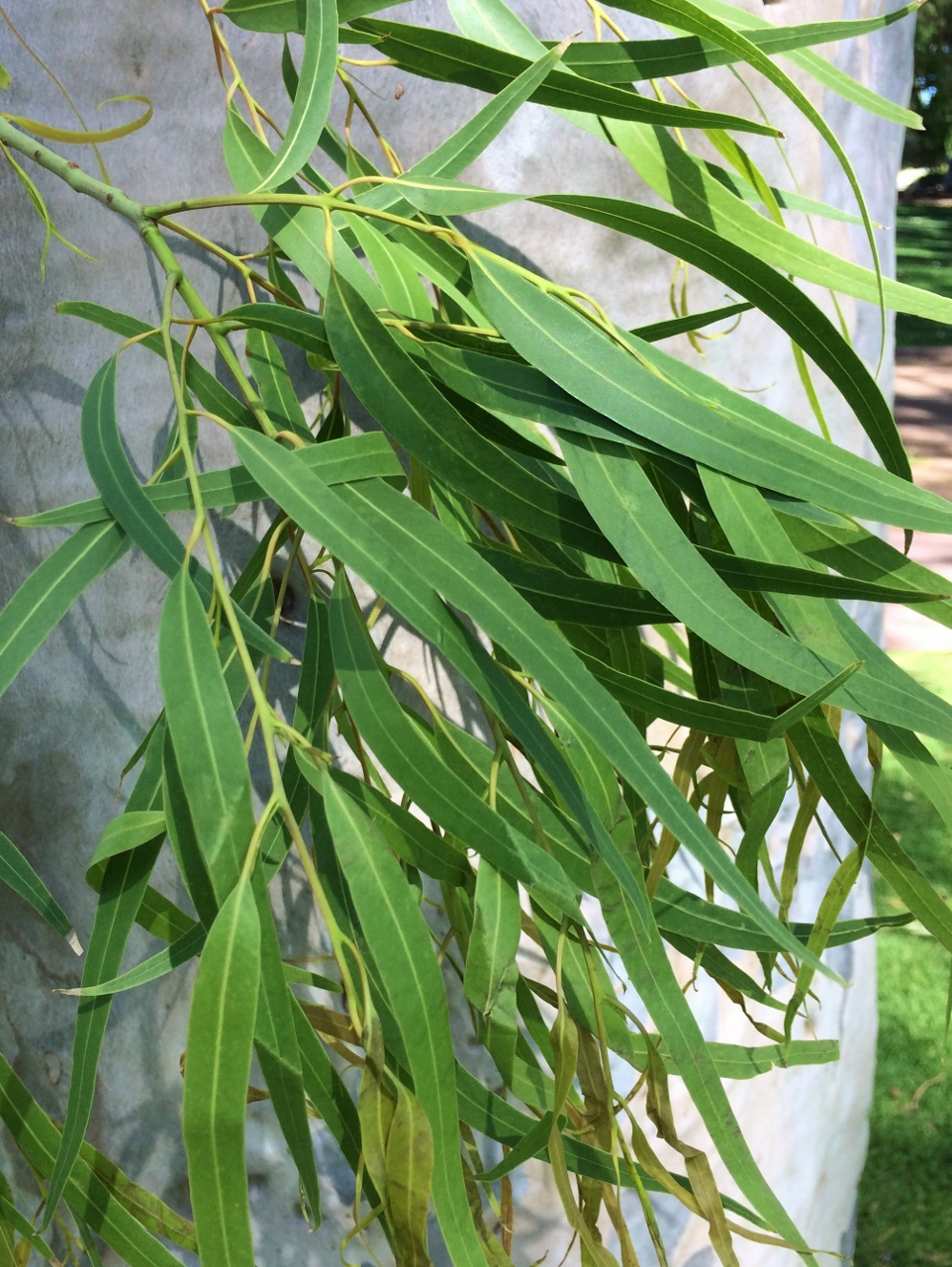
Juvenile leaves

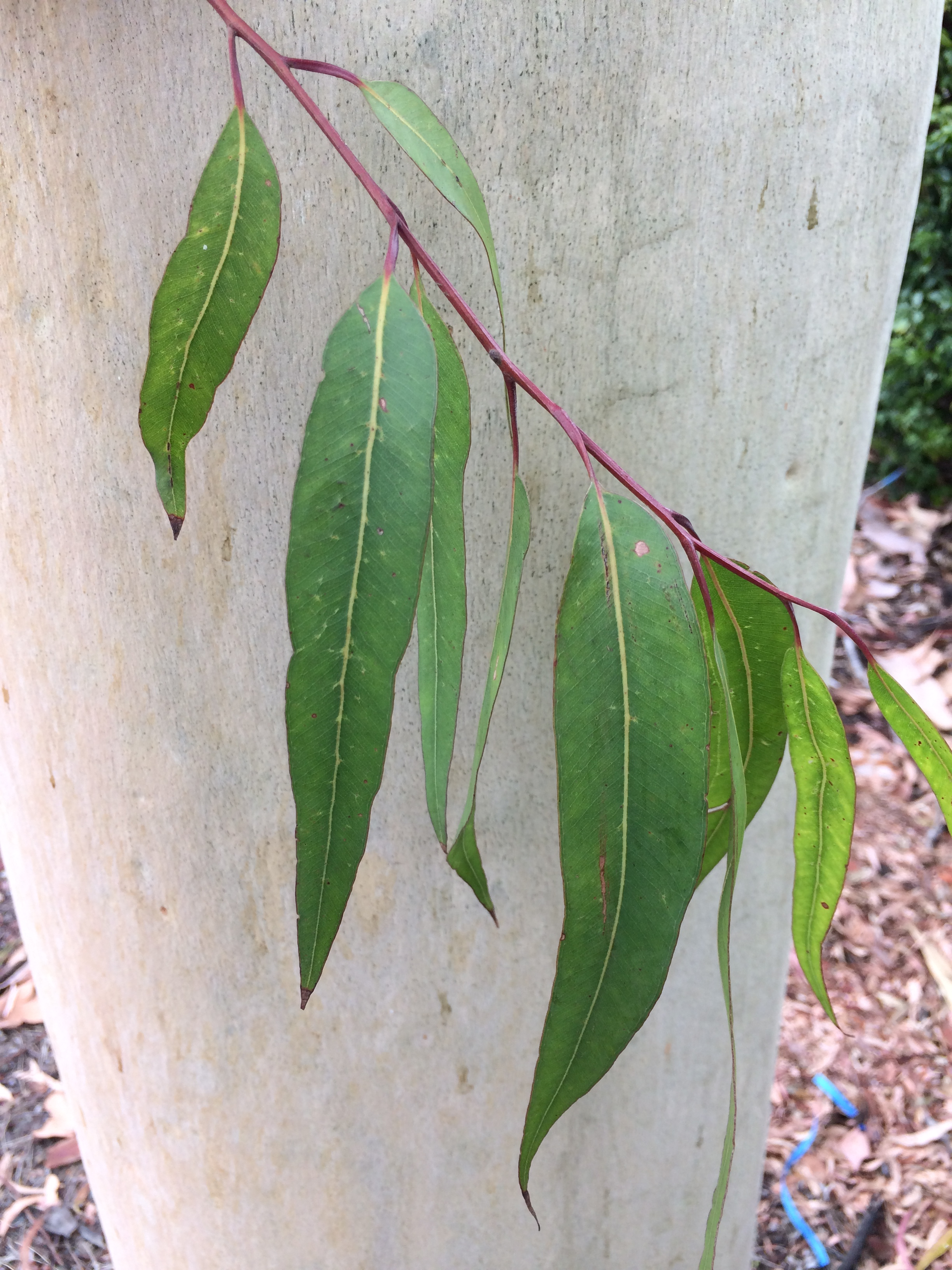
Adult leaves

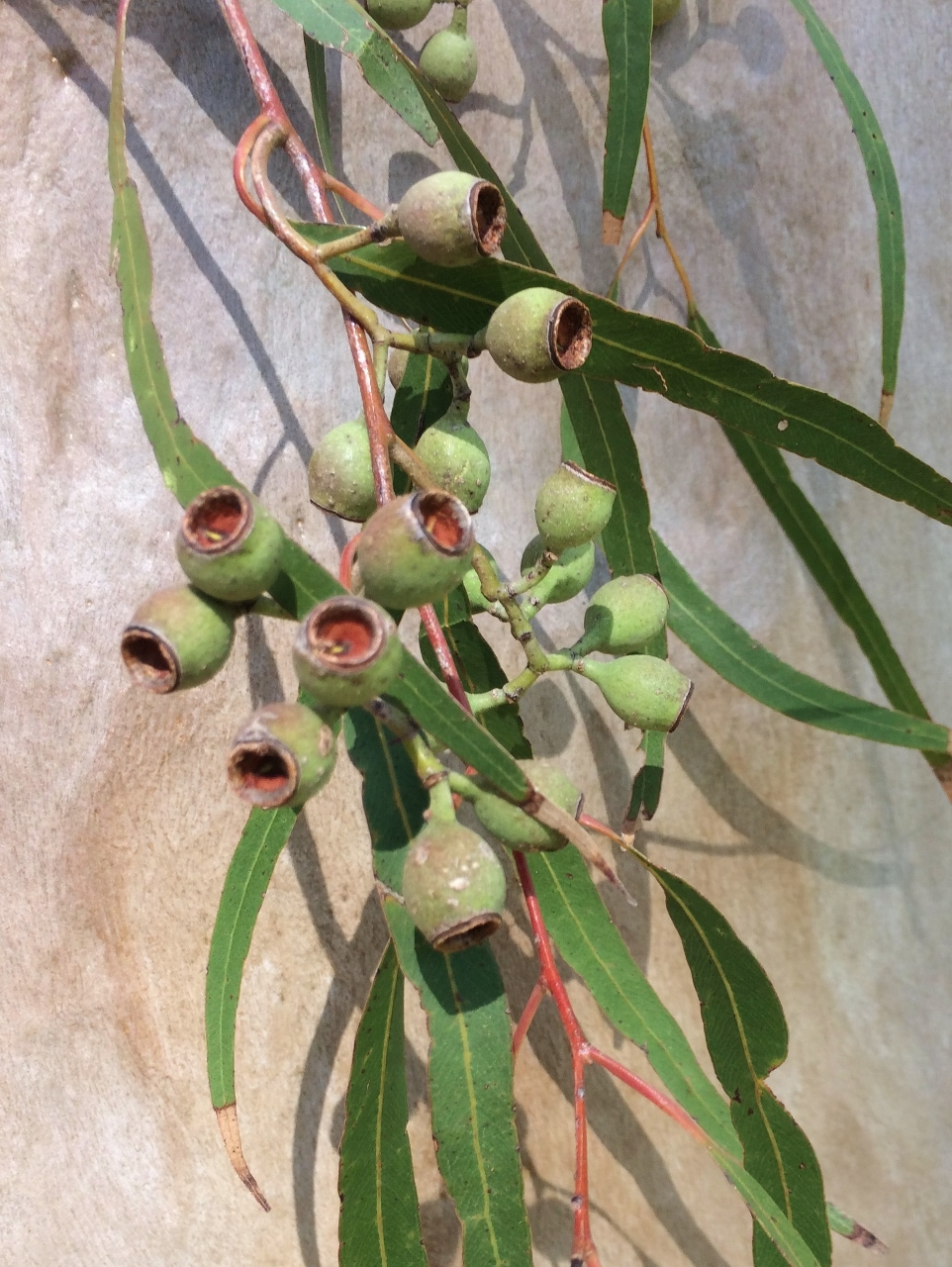
Fruit

== See also ==
- List of Corymbia species
