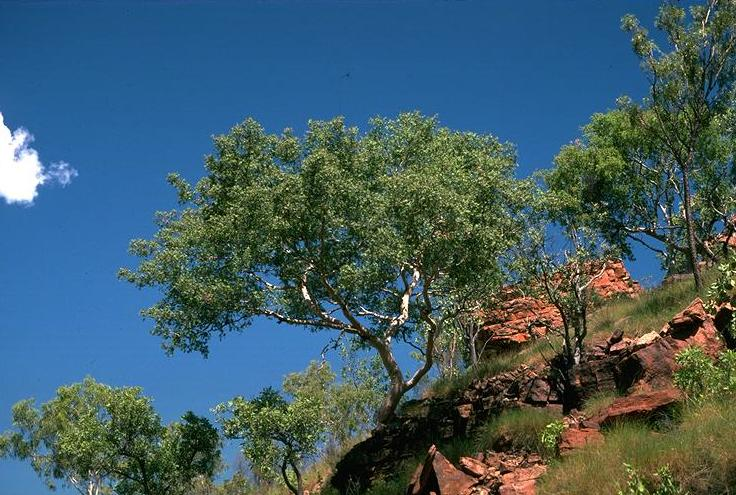

Scientific classification
- Kingdom: Plantae
- Clade: Tracheophytes
- Clade: Angiosperms
- Clade: Eudicots
- Clade: Rosids
- Order: Myrtales
- Family: Myrtaceae
- Genus: Corymbia
- Species: C. aspera

Binomial name
- Corymbia aspera (F.Muell.) K.D.Hill & L.A.S.Johnson

= Corymbia aspera =

Rough-leaved ghost gum

Species of plant

Corymbia aspera, commonly known as rough-leaved ghost gum, rough leaf range gum, is a species of tree that is endemic to northern Australia. It has smooth white bark, sometimes with a short stocking of rough bark near the base, a crown of sessile juvenile, heart-shaped or egg-shaped leaves, flower buds in groups of seven, creamy white flowers and cup-shaped, barrel-shaped or cylindrical fruit.

== Description ==
Corymbia aspera is a tree that typically grows to a height of 4 to 10 metres (13 to 33 ft), sometimes to 15 m (49 ft), and forms a lignotuber. It has smooth white, cream-coloured or grey bark, sometimes with flaky, tessellated bark at the base. The branchlets lack oil glands in the pith. Young plants and coppice regrowth have sessile, heart-shaped to egg-shaped leaves, 20–65 mm (0.79–2.56 in) long and 10–43 mm (0.39–1.69 in) wide arranged in opposite pairs. The crown consists of juvenile leaves that are sessile, the same shade of dull green to greyish on both sides, heart-shaped to egg-shaped, 15–68 mm (0.59–2.68 in) long and 7–35 mm (0.28–1.38 in) wide with the base stem-clasping or rounded. The flower buds are smooth, arranged in leaf axils on a branched peduncle up to 3 mm (0.12 in) long, each branch with seven buds on pedicels 2–7 mm (0.079–0.276 in) long. Mature buds are oval to pear-shaped, 3–5 mm (0.12–0.20 in) long and 3–4 mm (0.12–0.16 in) wide with a shallow, flattened operculum. Flowering occurs from October to December and the flowers are white or creamy white. The fruit is a woody cup-shaped, barrel-shaped or cylindrical capsule 5–8 mm (0.20–0.31 in) long and 4–7 mm (0.16–0.28 in) wide with a descending disc and the three valves enclosed in the fruit. The seeds are reddish brown, flattened to saucer-shaped.

== Taxonomy and naming ==
Rough-leaved ghost gum was first formally described in 1859 by Ferdinand von Mueller in the Journal of the Proceedings of the Linnean Society, Botany and given the name Eucalyptus apsera. In 1995, Ken Hill and Lawrie Johnson changed the name to Corymbia aspera. The specific epithet (aspera) is from the Latin word asper meaning "rough to the touch".

=== Indigenous names and uses ===
The Warumungu people of the Tennant Creek area know this tree as kuripi. When burnt, the ashes are often mixed with chewing tobacco, and sugarbag bees (a sweet delicacy) can often be found in the tree.

== Distribution and habitat ==
Corymbia aspera grows in low, open woodland on hills, ridges and plateaus as well as on floodplains in red sand, alluvium and skeletal soils. Its range extends from the Pilbara and Kimberley regions of Western Australia east through the Roper and McArthur River catchments in the Northern Territory and into Queensland as far east as the Selwyn Range to the south east of Cloncurry.

== See also ==
- List of Corymbia species
