= Gum tree =

Gum tree is the common name of several trees and plants:

- Eucalypteae, particularly:
  - Eucalyptus, which includes the majority of species of gum trees
  - Corymbia, which includes the ghost gums and spotted gums
  - Angophora, which includes Angophora costata Sydney red gum
- Nyssa sylvatica, common names include blackgum, sour gum
- Liquidambar, common names include sweetgum, star gum, gum, redgum
- Tristaniopsis laurina, common names include water gum
- Sapium glandulosum, in the family Euphorbiaceae, common names include gumtree
