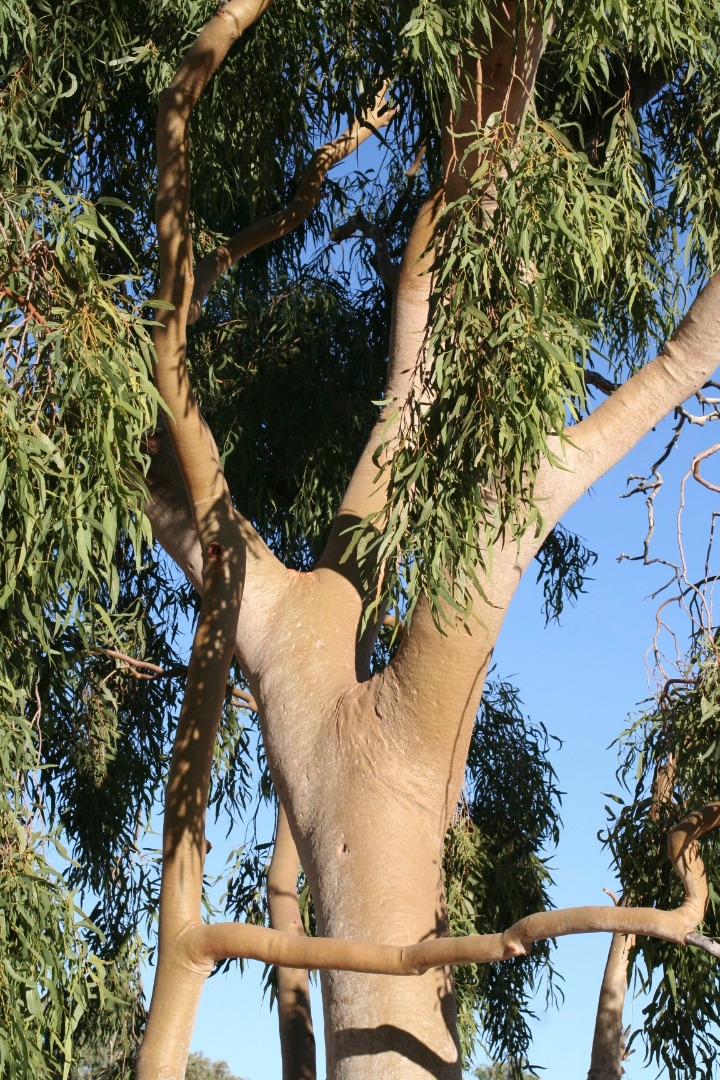

Scientific classification
- Kingdom: Plantae
- Clade: Embryophytes
- Clade: Tracheophytes
- Clade: Spermatophytes
- Clade: Angiosperms
- Clade: Eudicots
- Clade: Rosids
- Order: Myrtales
- Family: Myrtaceae
- Genus: Corymbia
- Species: C. blakei

Binomial name
- Corymbia blakei K.D.Hill & L.A.S.Johnson

Synonyms
- Corymbia blakei K.D.Hill & L.A.S.Johnson subsp. blakei; Corymbia blakei subsp. rasilis K.D.Hill & L.A.S.Johnson; Corymbia inobvia K.D.Hill & L.A.S.Johnson; Eucalyptus blakei (K.D.Hill & L.A.S.Johnson) Brooker; Eucalyptus gilbertensis auct. non (Maiden & Blakely) S.T.Blake: Chippendale, G.M.

= Corymbia blakei =

Species of plant

Corymbia blakei, commonly known as ghost gum, is a species of tree that is endemic to Queensland. It has smooth bark, sometimes with a stocking of rough bark on older specimens, linear to narrow lance-shaped adult leaves, flower buds usually in groups of three, creamy white flowers and barrel-shaped, cup-shaped or cylindrical fruit.

== Description ==
Corymbia blakei is a tree that typically grows to a height of 10 metres (33 ft) and forms a lignotuber. It has smooth, powdery white to creamy grey bark, with a short stocking of rough, tessellated, dark grey bark at the base of older specimens. Young plants and coppice regrowth have heart-shaped, egg-shaped or elliptical leaves that are 20–60 mm (0.79–2.36 in) long and 10–30 mm (0.39–1.18 in) wide. Adult leaves are the same shade of green on both sides, linear, narrow lance-shaped or curved, 40–130 mm (1.6–5.1 in) long and 3–18 mm (0.12–0.71 in) wide, tapering to a petiole 3–17 mm (0.12–0.67 in) long. The flower buds are arranged in leaf axils on a branched peduncle up to 2 mm (0.079 in) long, each branch usually with three buds on pedicels 1–4 mm (0.039–0.157 in) long. Mature buds are pear-shaped, 4–5 mm (0.16–0.20 in) long and 3–4 mm (0.12–0.16 in) wide with a rounded operculum. Flowering has been recorded in December and the flowers are creamy white. The fruit is a woody barrel-shaped, cup-shaped or cylindrical capsule 6–10 mm (0.24–0.39 in) long and 5–9 mm (0.20–0.35 in) wide with the valves enclosed in the fruit.

== Taxonomy and naming ==
Corymbia blakei was first formally described in 1995 by Ken Hill and Lawrie Johnson from specimens collected by Stanley Thatcher Blake in 1936. The specific epithet (blakei) honours the collector of the type specimens.

== Distribution and habitat ==
This ghost gum is endemic to an area in arid South West and Central West Queensland, extending from the Cory Range south west of Winton to the upper Paroo and Bulloo River area between Charleville and Quilpie.

== Conservation status ==
This eucalypt (as C. blakei subsp. blakei) is classified as of "least concern" under the Queensland Government Nature Conservation Act 1992.

== See also ==
- List of Corymbia species
