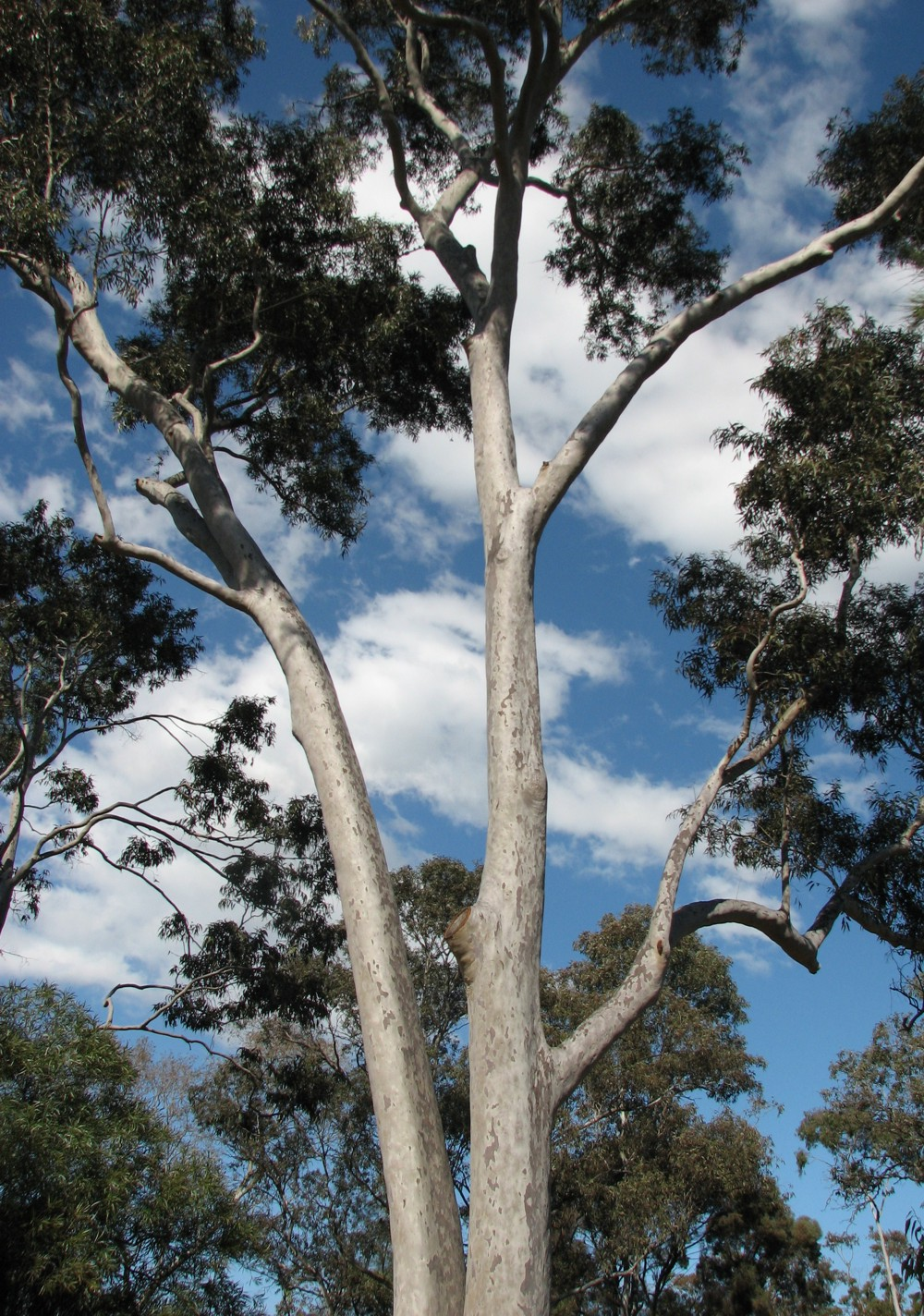
- Cultivated specimen in Burnley Gardens

Conservation status
- Least Concern (IUCN 3.1)

Scientific classification
- Kingdom: Plantae
- Clade: Tracheophytes
- Clade: Angiosperms
- Clade: Eudicots
- Clade: Rosids
- Order: Myrtales
- Family: Myrtaceae
- Genus: Corymbia
- Species: C. maculata

Binomial name
- Corymbia maculata (Hook.) K.D. Hill & L.A.S.Johnson

Synonyms
- Eucalyptus maculata Hook.; Eucalyptus maculata Hook. var. maculata

= Corymbia maculata =

Spotted gum

Species of plant

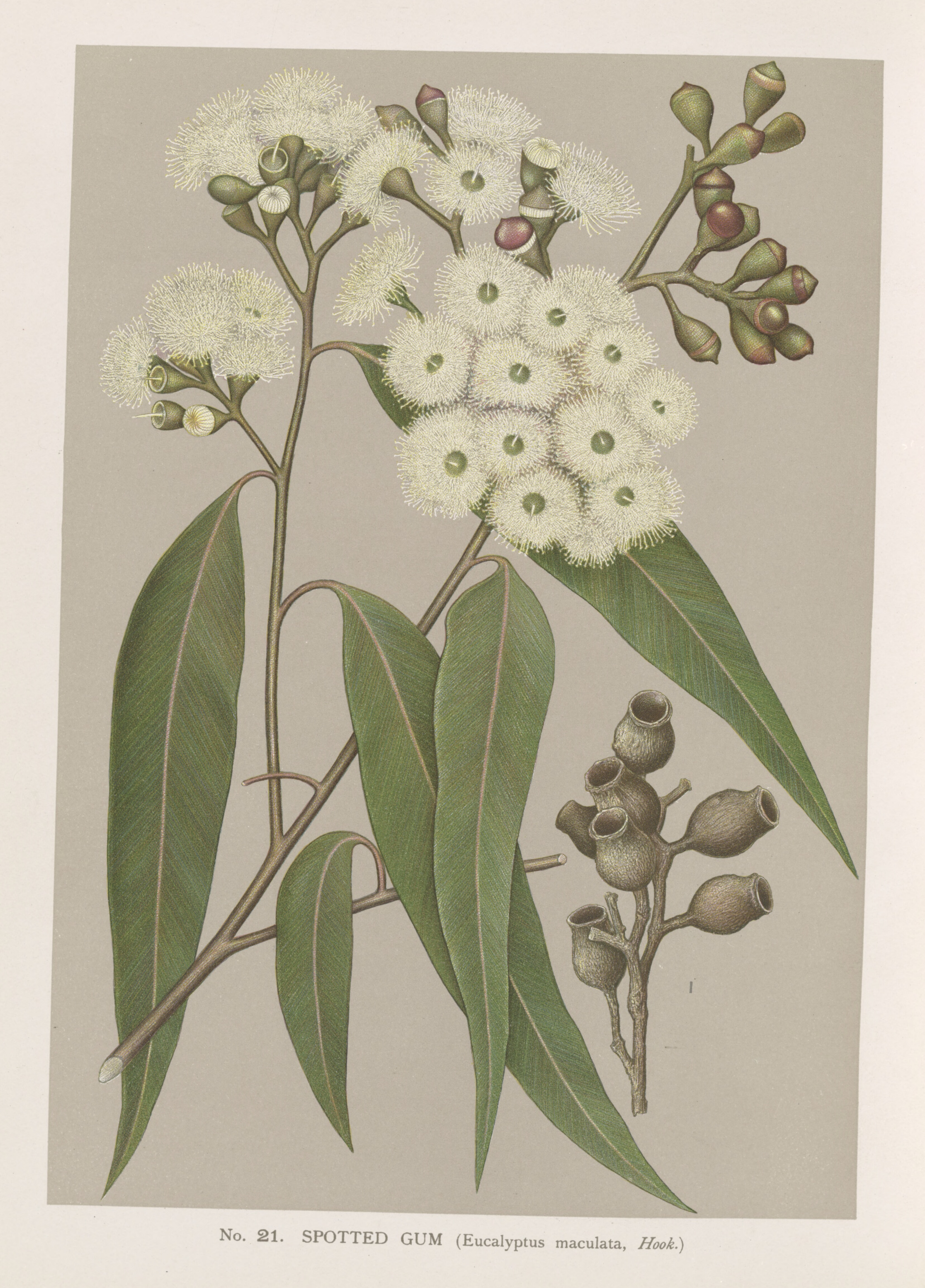
Illustration by Edward Minchen from Joseph Maiden's book, The Flowering Plants and Ferns of New South Wales

Corymbia maculata, commonly known as spotted gum, is a species of medium-sized to tall tree that is endemic to eastern Australia. It has smooth, mottled bark, lance-shaped to curved adult leaves, flower buds usually in groups of three, white flowers and urn-shaped or barrel-shaped fruit.

== Description ==
Corymbia maculata is a tree that typically grows to a height of 45–60 m (148–197 ft) and forms a lignotuber. It has smooth mottled pinkish grey or bluish grey, often dimpled bark that is shed in small, irregular flakes. Young plants and coppice regrowth have leaves that are glossy green, broadly egg-shaped to lance-shaped, 70–190 mm (2.8–7.5 in) long and 30–75 mm (1.2–3.0 in) wide and petiolate. Adult leaves are the same shade of green on both sides, lance-shaped or curved, 80–210 mm (3.1–8.3 in) long and 12–30 mm (0.5–1.2 in) wide, tapering to a petiole 10–25 mm (0.4–1.0 in) long. The flower buds are arranged in leaf axils on a branched peduncle 3–20 mm (0.12–0.79 in) long, each branch of the peduncle with three, rarely seven, buds on pedicels 1–8 mm (0.04–0.31 in) long. Mature buds are oval to pear-shaped, 8–10 mm (0.31–0.39 in) long and 6–8 mm (0.24–0.31 in) wide with a hemispherical, conical or beaked operculum that is shorter than the floral cup. Flowering occurs from March to September and the flowers are white. The fruit is a woody oval, barrel-shaped or slightly urn-shaped capsule 9–14 mm (0.35–0.55 in) long and 8–13 mm (0.31–0.51 in) wide with the valves enclosed in the fruit.

Corymbia citriodora and C. henryi are similar to C. maculata but have a more northerly distribution extending into Queensland. The adult leaves of C. citriodora are slightly narrower and those of C. henryii wider than those of C. maculata.

== Taxonomy and naming ==
Spotted gum was first formally described in 1844 by William Jackson Hooker in his book Icones Plantarum, and given the name Eucalyptus maculata. In 1995, Ken Hill and Lawrie Johnson changed the name to Corymbia maculata. The specific name maculata is derived from the Latin maculatus, meaning 'spotted', referring to the spotted pattern on the bark.

== Distribution ==
Corymbia maculata is a widespread species in open forest from near Bega and north along the coast of New South Wales to near Taree. There is a disjunct population near Orbost in Victoria. It often forms dense, pure stands in forest and often grows on moderately infertile soil. The species is naturalised in Western Australia and South Australia, and in areas of New South Wales and Victoria outside its natural range.

== Ecology ==
The flowers of this species attract honeyeaters.

== Uses ==
=== Use in horticulture ===
Spotted gum is often used for planting in parks and as a street tree; however, its mature size makes it unsuitable for most home gardens.

=== Timber ===
The timber of spotted gum is strong, and exploited in a range of construction uses. It is used in flooring although the pale sapwood is susceptible to Lyctus borer unless treated.

== See also ==
- List of Corymbia species
