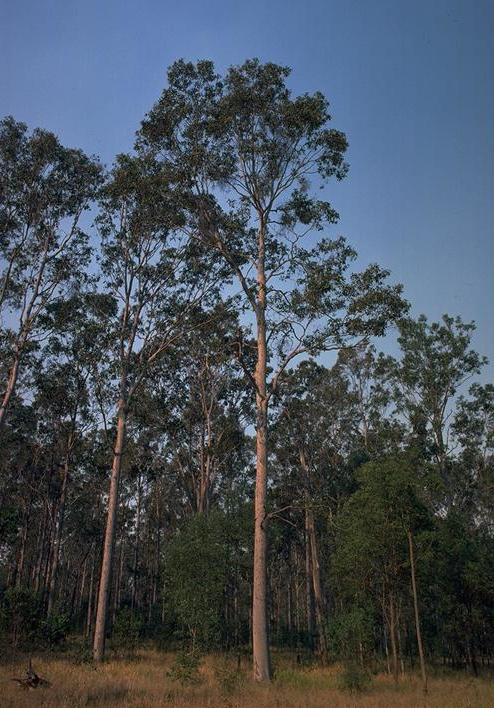
- Near Grafton

Scientific classification
- Kingdom: Plantae
- Clade: Tracheophytes
- Clade: Angiosperms
- Clade: Eudicots
- Clade: Rosids
- Order: Myrtales
- Family: Myrtaceae
- Genus: Corymbia
- Species: C. henryi

Binomial name
- Corymbia henryi (S.T.Blake) K.D.Hill & L.A.S.Johnson

Synonyms
- Eucalyptus henryi S.T.Blake

= Corymbia henryi =

Large-leaved spotted gum

Species of plant

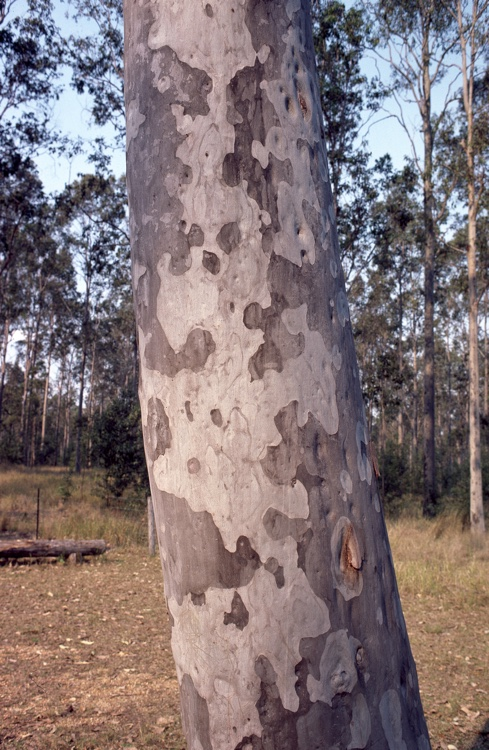
Bark

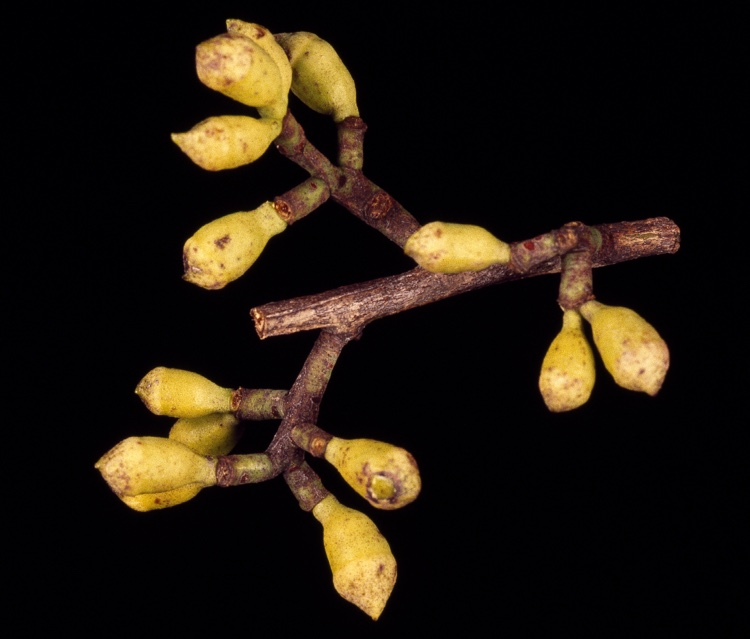
Flower buds

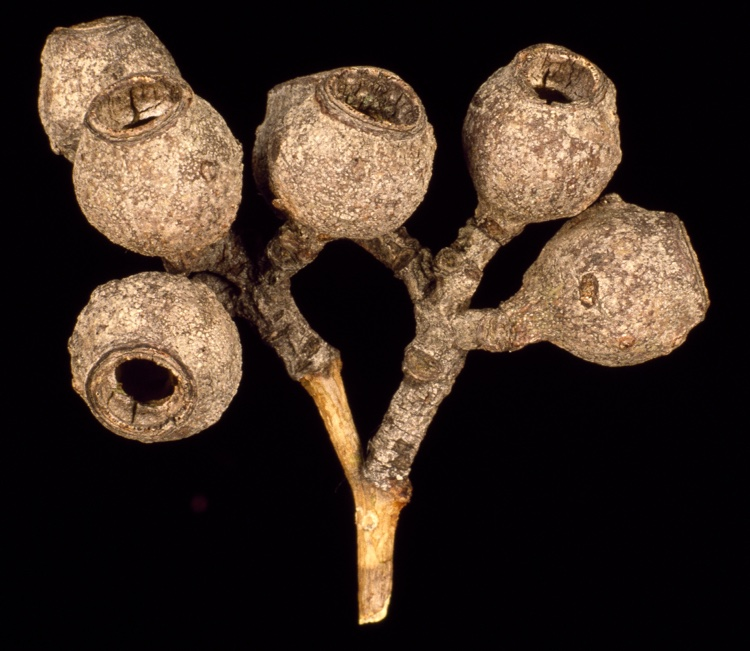
Fruit

Corymbia henryi, commonly known as large-leaved spotted gum, is a species of small to medium-sized tree that is endemic to north-eastern Australia. It has smooth, mottled bark, lance-shaped adult leaves, flower buds in groups of three, white or lemon yellow flowers and barrel-shaped to urn-shaped fruit.

== Description ==
Corymbia henryi is a tree that typically grows to a height of 25–30 m (82–98 ft) and forms a lignotuber. It has smooth, mottled grey, cream-coloured and pink bark. Young plants and coppice regrowth have broadly egg-shaped to lance-shaped leaves that are 80–250 mm (3.1–9.8 in) long and 40–100 mm (1.6–3.9 in) wide. Adult leaves are the same shade of glossy green on both sides, lance-shaped, 110–280 mm (4.3–11.0 in) long and 22–45 mm (0.9–1.8 in) wide, tapering to a petiole 15–30 mm (0.6–1.2 in) long. The flower buds are arranged on the ends of branchlets on a branched peduncle 5–10 mm (0.2–0.4 in) long, each branch of the peduncle with three buds on pedicels 2–7 mm (0.08–0.28 in) long. Mature buds are oval to pear-shaped, 12–13 mm (0.47–0.51 in) long and 6–8 mm (0.24–0.31 in) wide with a conical, beaked operculum. Flowering has been observed in January, April and November and the flowers are white or lemon-yellow. The fruit is a woody barrel-shaped to urn-shaped capsule 9–15 mm (0.35–0.59 in) long and 9–16 mm (0.35–0.63 in) wide with the valves inclosed in the fruit.

This species is similar to some forms of C. citriodora but lacks the lemon-scented oils of that species and has larger leaves, flower buds and fruit.

== Taxonomy and naming ==
Large-leaved spotted gum was first formally described in 1977 by Stanley Thatcher Blake in the journal Austrobaileya and given the name Eucalyptus henryi. Blake collected the type specimens near Stafford in 1956. In 1995, Ken Hill and Lawrie Johnson changed the name to Corymbia henryi. The specific epithet (henryi) honours "Mr. N. Henry of the Queensland Department of Forestry".

== Distribution and habitat ==
Corymbia henryi grows in forest, usually on more or less level country from near Brisbane and Toowoomba in Queensland to near Glenreagh in New South Wales.
