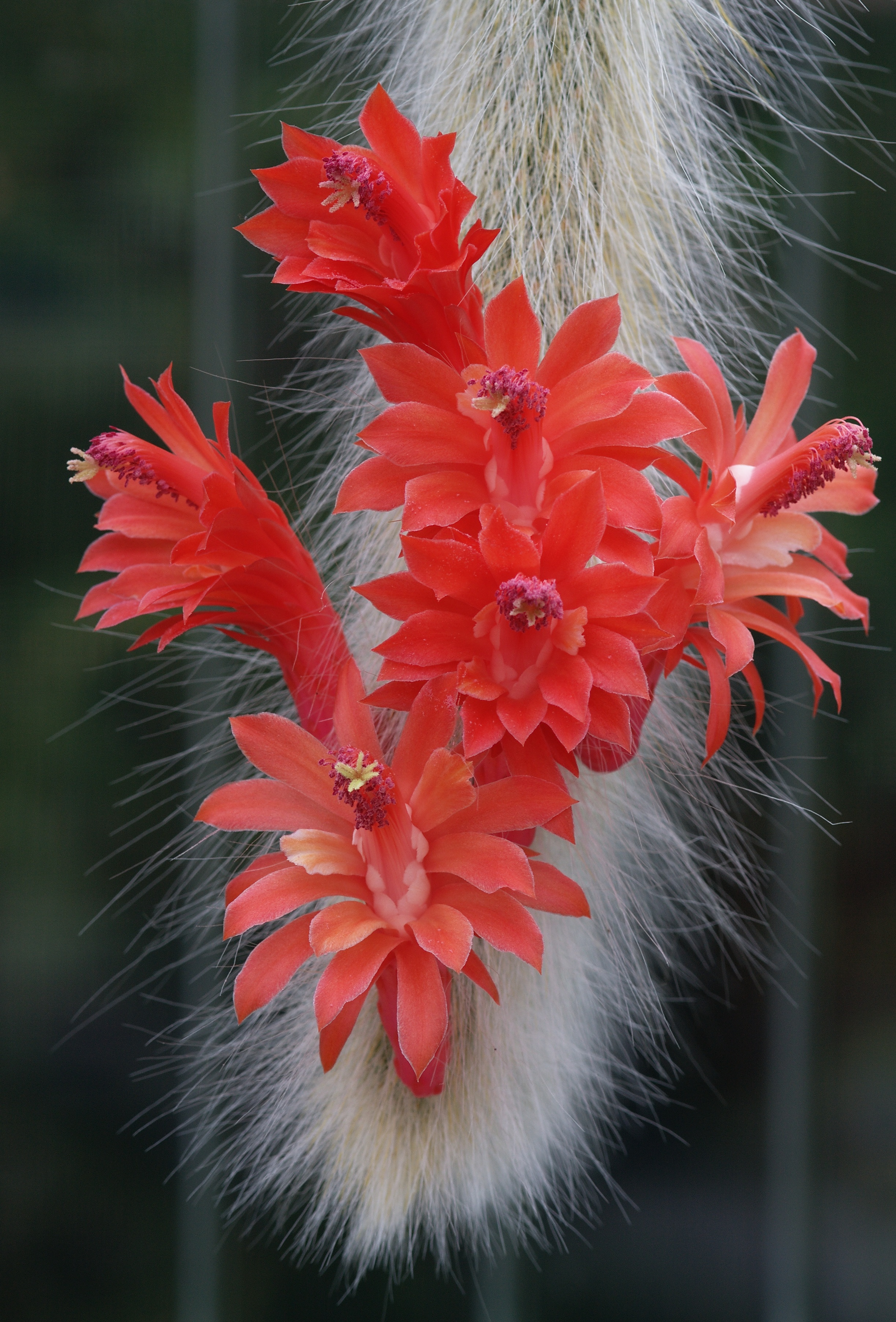

Conservation status
- Endangered (IUCN 3.1)

Scientific classification
- Kingdom: Plantae
- Clade: Tracheophytes
- Clade: Angiosperms
- Clade: Eudicots
- Order: Caryophyllales
- Family: Cactaceae
- Subfamily: Cactoideae
- Genus: Cleistocactus
- Species: C. colademononis

Binomial name
- Cleistocactus colademononis (Diers & Krahn) Mottram

Synonyms
- Bolivicereus colademononis (Diers & Krahn) Lodé; Bolivicereus simius-cauda Lodé; Borzicactus colademononis (Diers & Krahn) Lodé; Cleistocactus winteri subsp. colademono D.R.Hunt; Hildewintera colademononis Diers & Krahn; Winterocereus colademononis (Diers & Krahn) Metzing & R.Kiesling

= Cleistocactus colademononis =

Species of cactus

Cleistocactus colademononis is a succulent of the family Cactaceae. It has gained the Royal Horticultural Society's Award of Garden Merit. It is native to Bolivia. It is sometimes considered to be a subspecies of the golden rat-tail cactus Cleistocactus winteri, Cleistocactus winteri subsp. colademono.

== Description ==
Cleistocactus colademononis grows hanging and branches at the base, reaching up to 2.5 meters in length. Its light green stems are 3 to 7 centimeters in diameter and feature 14 to 20 low ribs. Areoles are spaced 3 to 6 millimeters apart and produce 0 to 4, sometimes up to 8, downward-pointing, bristle-like, yellowish spines, along with 20 to 50 hair-like, white spines that are 4 to 8 centimeters long (up to 12 cm). The hair-like spines regenerate over time. The flowers are zygomorphic, measuring 7 to 8 centimeters long, and are a vibrant red. They emerge almost horizontally from the areoles. The fruit is spherical, reddish, and 8 to 12 millimeters in diameter. When dried, it splits lengthwise. The seeds are black, slightly curved, and measure 1.1 to 1.4 millimeters long.

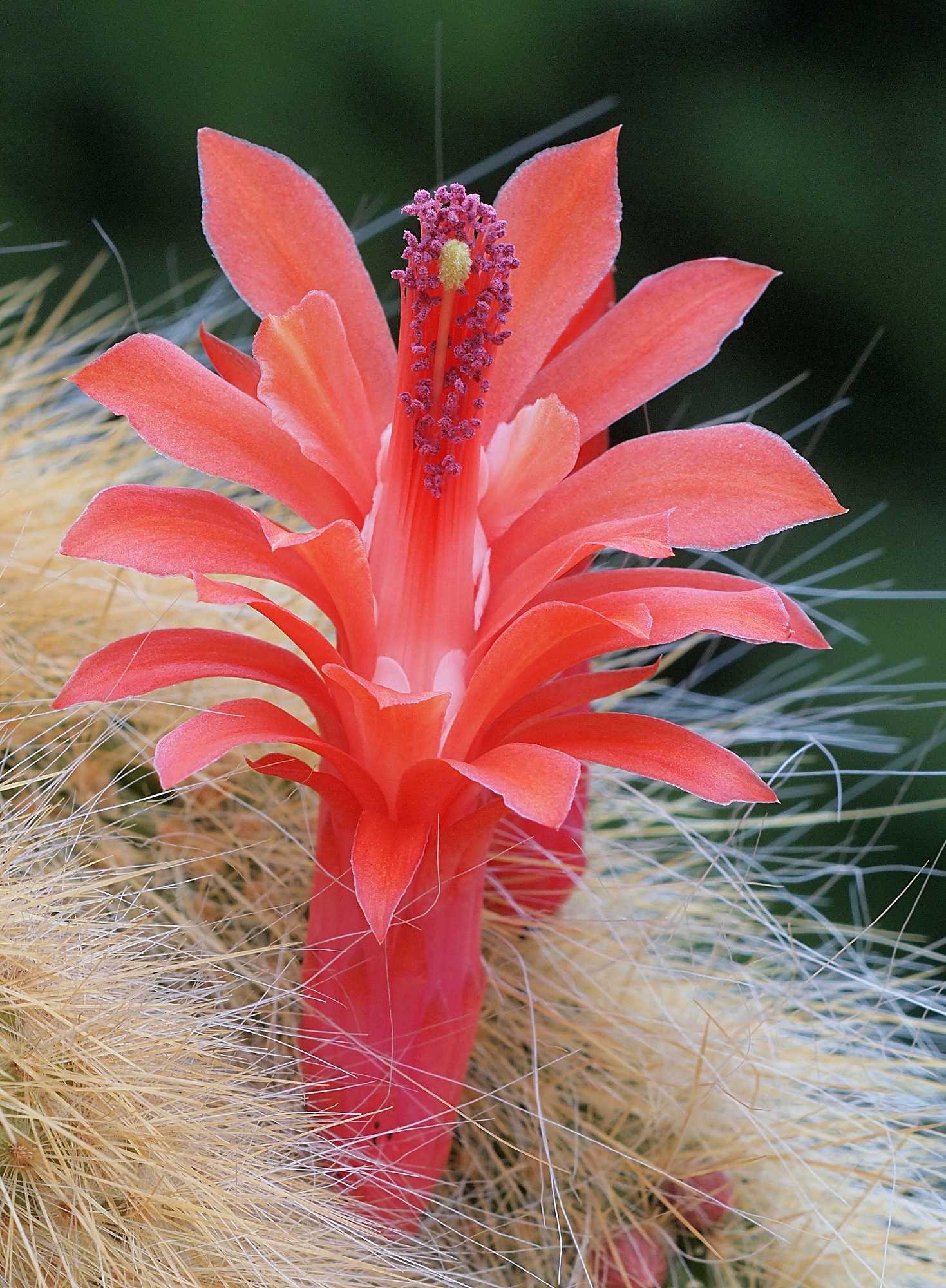
Flower

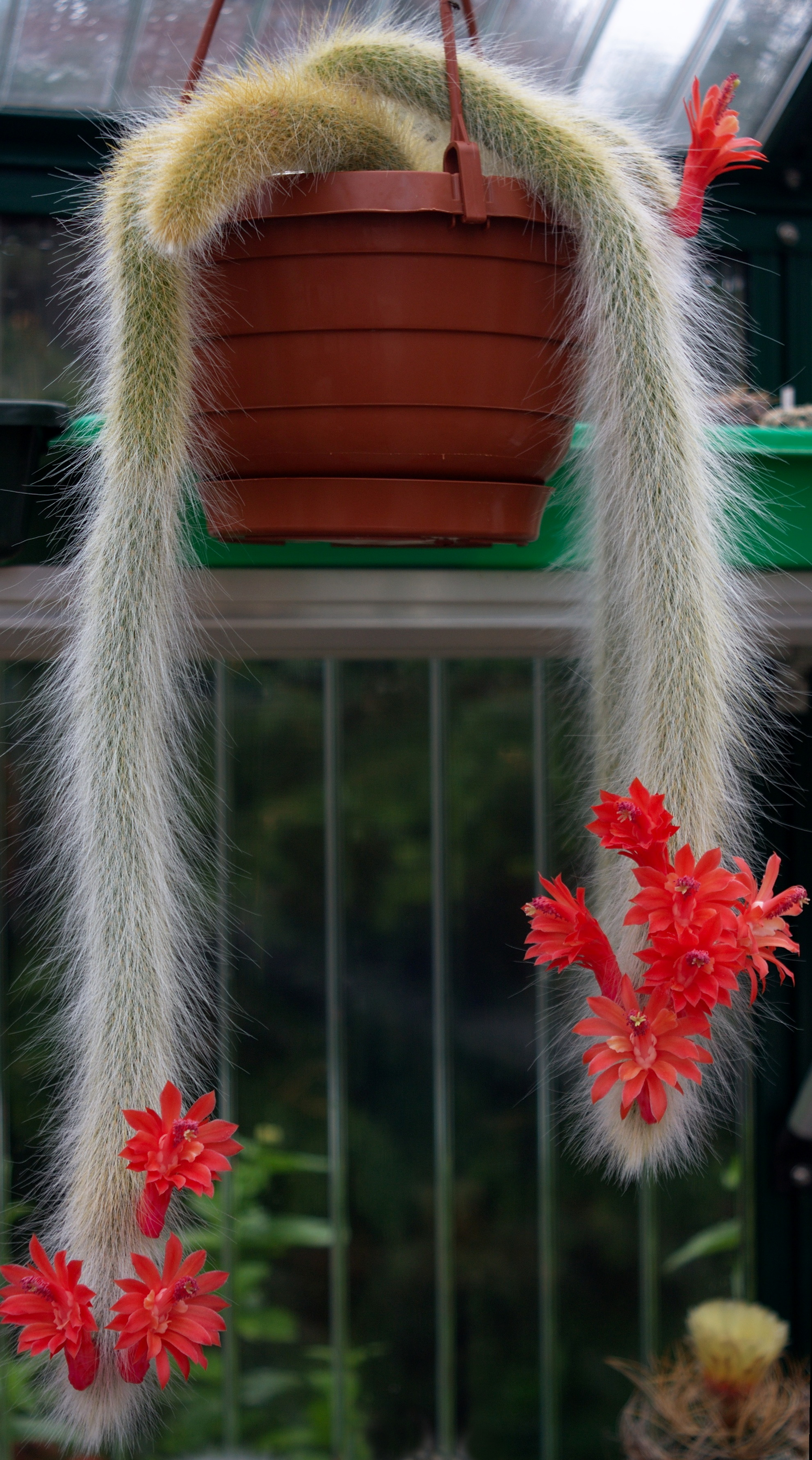
Plant

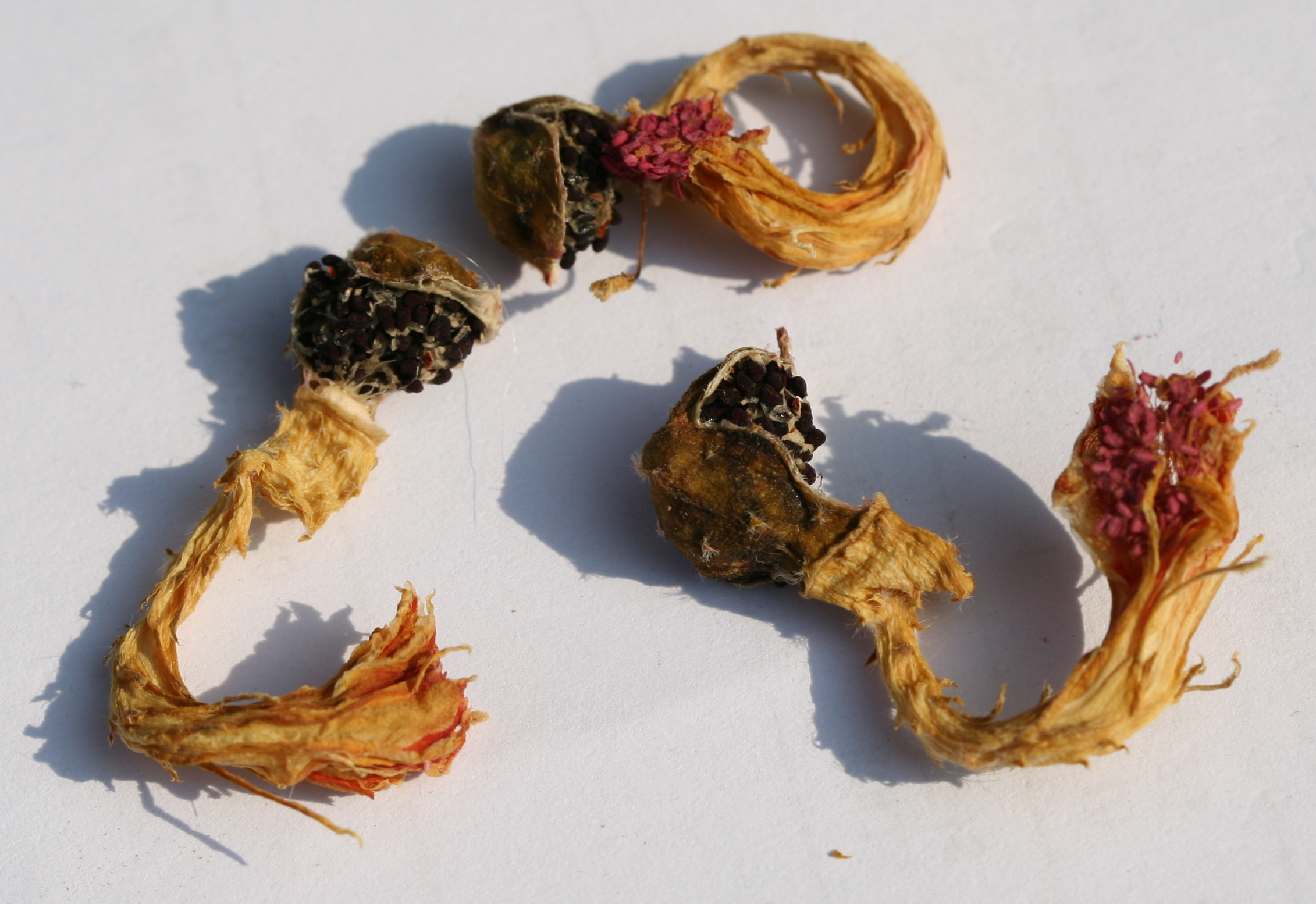
Dried fruits and seeds

== Distribution ==
Cleistocactus colademononis is endemic to Bolivia, specifically in the Santa Cruz department, province of Florida, about 30 kilometers east of Samaipata, on Cerro el Fraile mountain. It grows at altitudes below 1500 meters, on humid, steep rock faces where it hangs.

== Taxonomy ==
The species was first described as Hildewintera colademononis in 2003 by Lothar Diers and Wolfgang Krahn. Its name means "monkey's tail," referencing its hairy, tail-like appearance. In 2006, botanist Roy Mottram reclassified it into the genus Cleistocactus.
