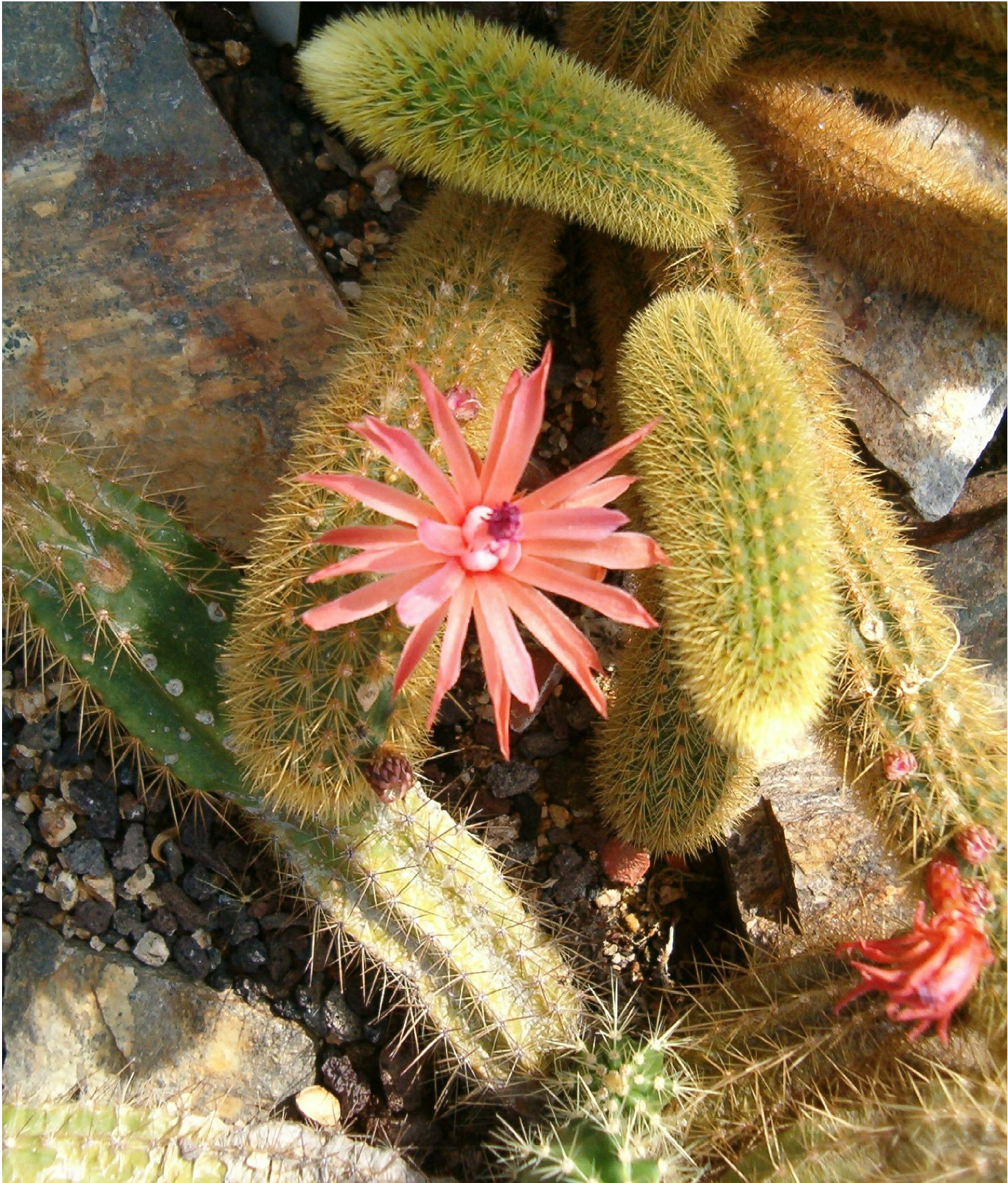

Conservation status
- Endangered (IUCN 3.1)

Scientific classification
- Kingdom: Plantae
- Clade: Tracheophytes
- Clade: Angiosperms
- Clade: Eudicots
- Order: Caryophyllales
- Family: Cactaceae
- Subfamily: Cactoideae
- Genus: Cleistocactus
- Species: C. winteri

Binomial name
- Cleistocactus winteri D.Hunt

Synonyms
- Borzicactus aureispinus (F.Ritter) G.D.Rowley; Cleistocactus aureispinus (F.Ritter) D.R.Hunt; Hildewintera aureispina (F.Ritter) F.Ritter ex G.D.Rowley; Winteria aureispina F.Ritter; Winterocereus aureispinus (F.Ritter) Backeb.

= Cleistocactus winteri =

Golden rat tail

Species of cactus

Cleistocactus winteri is a succulent of the family Cactaceae. Its common name is the golden rat tail. Cleistocactus colademononis, which has gained the Royal Horticultural Society's Award of Garden Merit, is sometimes considered to be a subspecies, Cleistocactus winteri subsp. colademono.

== Description ==
This plant is a columnar cactus that forms huge tangled mounds of fairly rapid growth hanging or creeping, green shoots, up to 90 centimetres (35 in) high with stems 2 to 2.5 centimetres (3/4 to 1 in) in diameter and 16 to 17 ribs, with 50 spines 0.4 to 1 centimetre (1/8 to 3/8 in) long. The brown areoles on it are close together. It has many short bristly golden spines that are flexible, thin and straight and literally cover the surface of the stems. The approximately 20 stronger central spines are 5 to 10 millimeters long. The plant requires water during the summer and to be kept dry in the winter. It reproduces by seeds and cuttings.

It has salmon-pink flowers in spring and summer that are 4 to 6 centimetres (1 1/2 to 2 1/4 in) long and 5 centimetres (2 in) in diameter. Depending on the position of the shoots, the flowers are bent upwards to outwards to upright. The bracts are orange-red. The outer ones are radiating to slightly reflexed, the inner ones distinctly shorter and erect. Its flowers survive for a few days before transitioning to fruit for a short period of time which are 1 centimetre (3/8 in) long. The stamens and style protrude from the flower. The barrel-shaped, green to reddish-green fruits are 7 to 10 millimeters long and reach the same diameter.

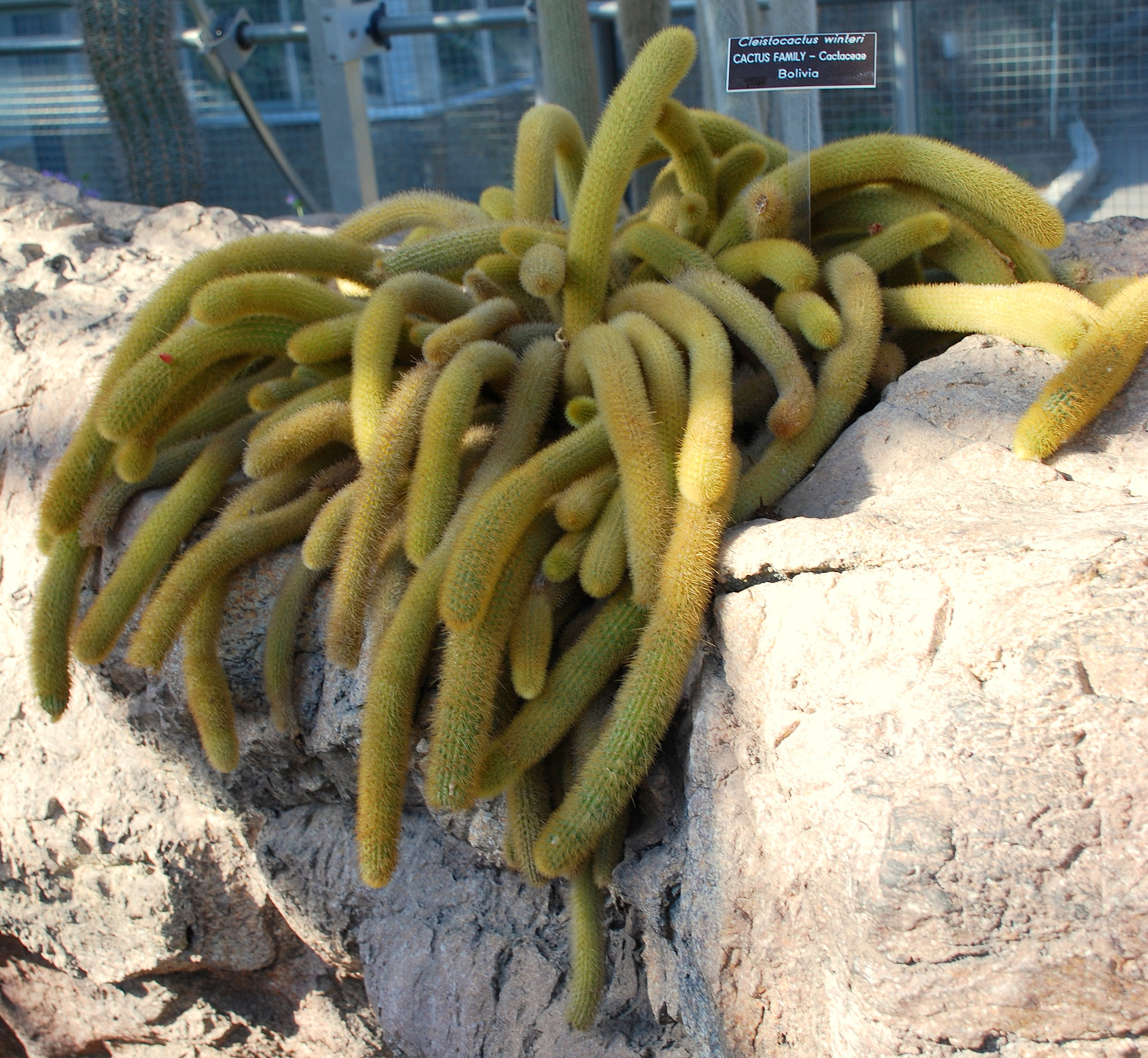
form

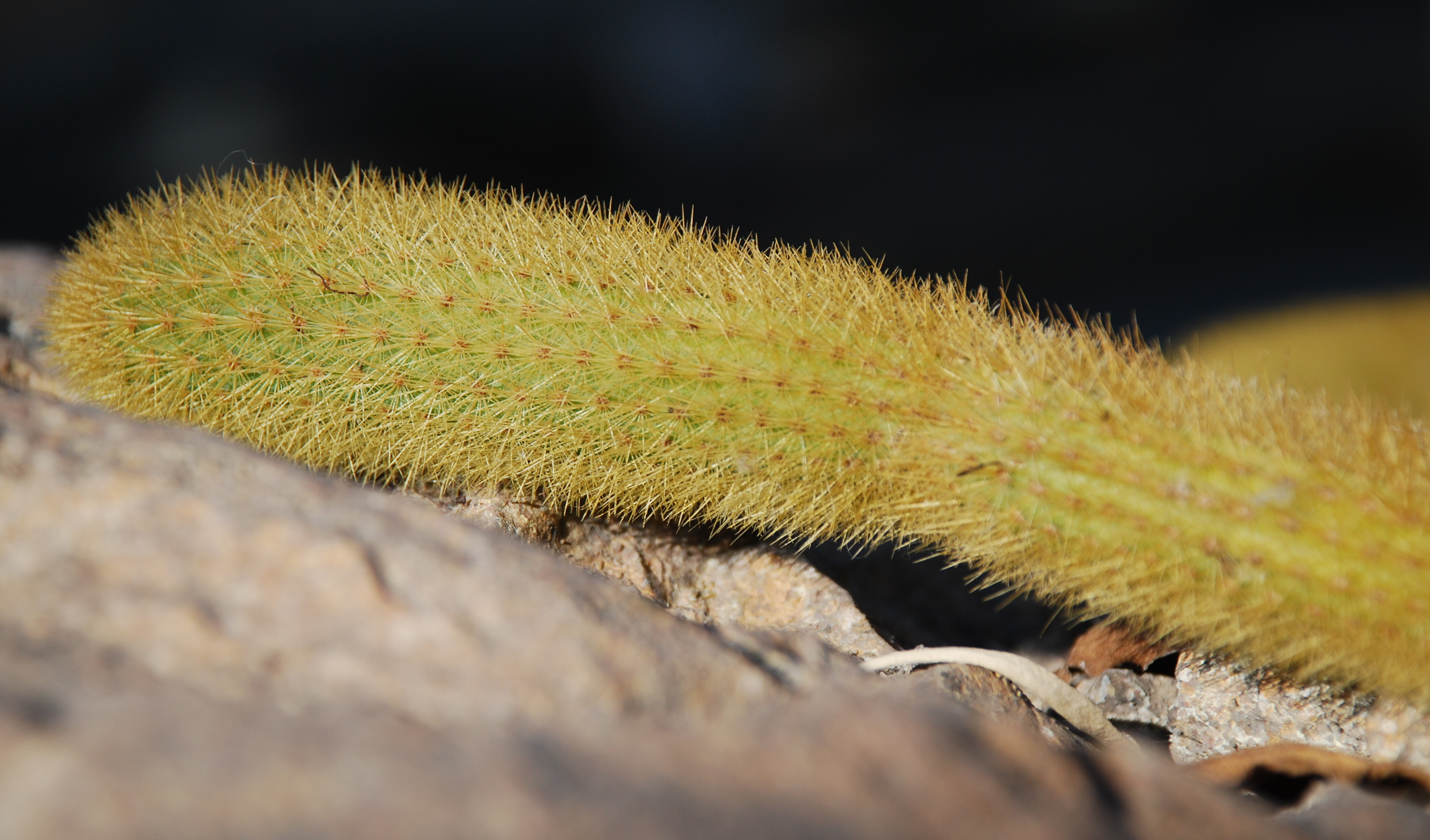
close-up

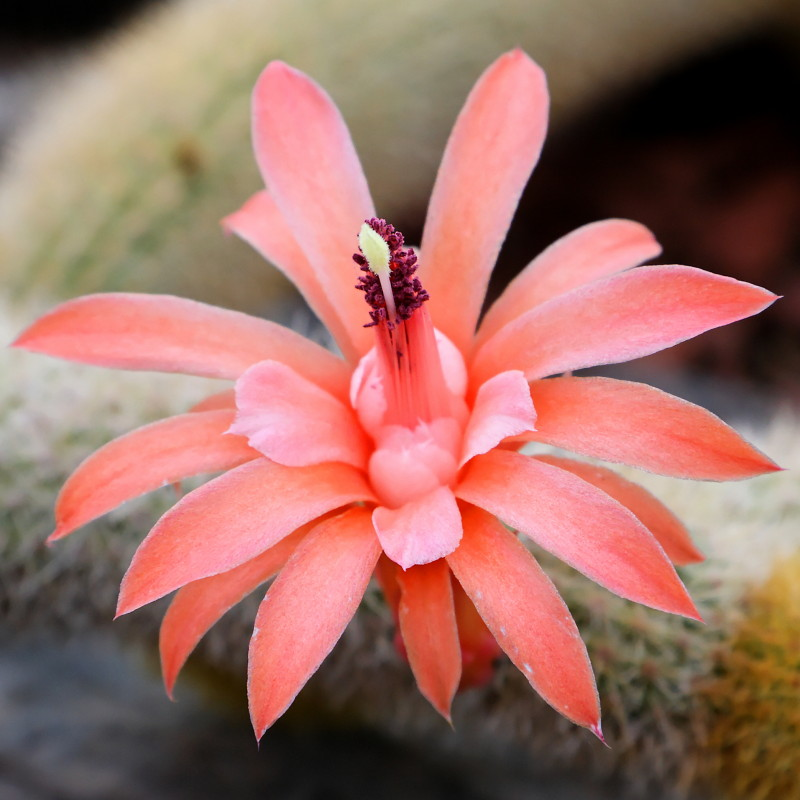
Flower

== Distribution ==
Cleistocactus winteri is distributed in the Bolivian department of Santa Cruz in the province of Florida at altitudes of about 1400 to 1500 meters where it hangs on rocks.

== Taxonomy ==
The first description as Winteria aureispina was in 1962 by Friedrich Ritter. David Richard Hunt placed the species in the genus Cleistocactus in 1988. A new name was necessary because the name Cleistocactus aureispinus Frič (1928) already existed. Nomenclature synonyms are Winterocereus aureispinus (F.Ritter) Backeb. (1966), Hildewintera aureispina (F.Ritter) F.Ritter (1968), Loxanthocereus aureispinus (F.Ritter) F.Buxbaum (1974), Borzicactus aureispinus (F.Ritter) G.D.Rowley (1975) and Cleistocactus aureispinus (F. Ritter) D.R.Hunt (1987, nom. illegal).
