= List of Dendrobium species =

The following is a list of Dendrobium species accepted by the Plants of the World Online at December 2024.

== A ==
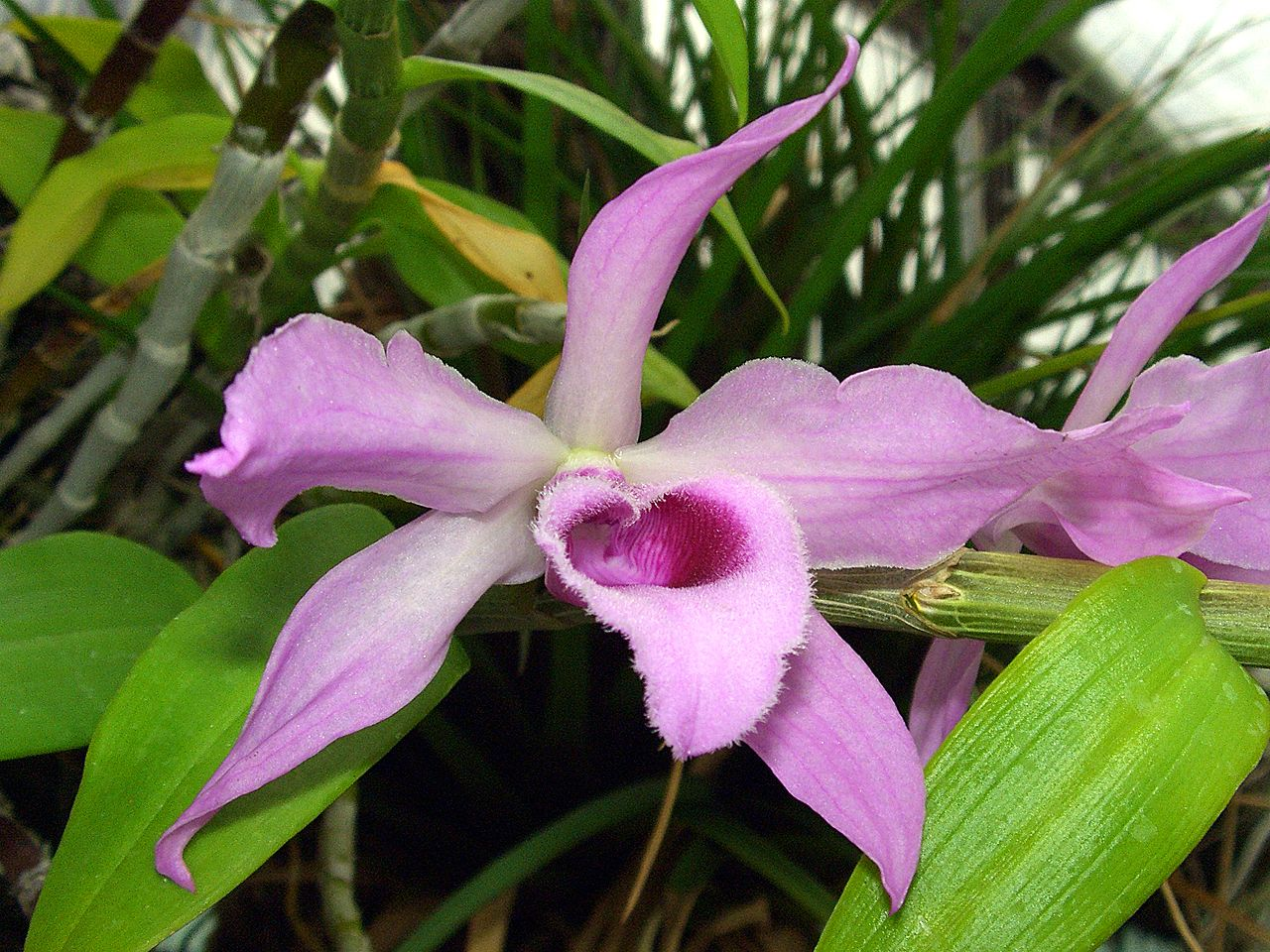
Dendrobium anosmum the unscented dendrobium

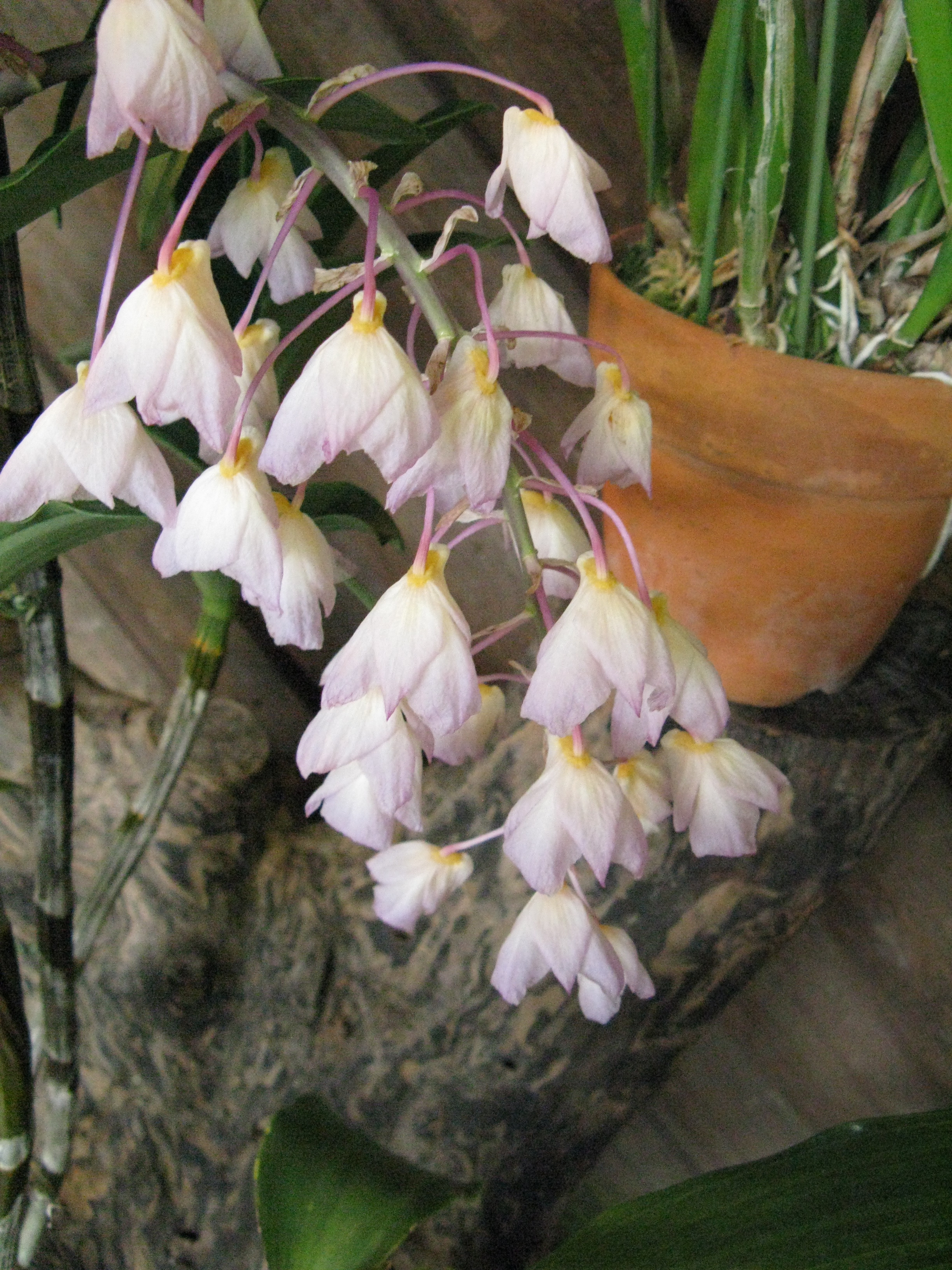
Dendrobium amabile

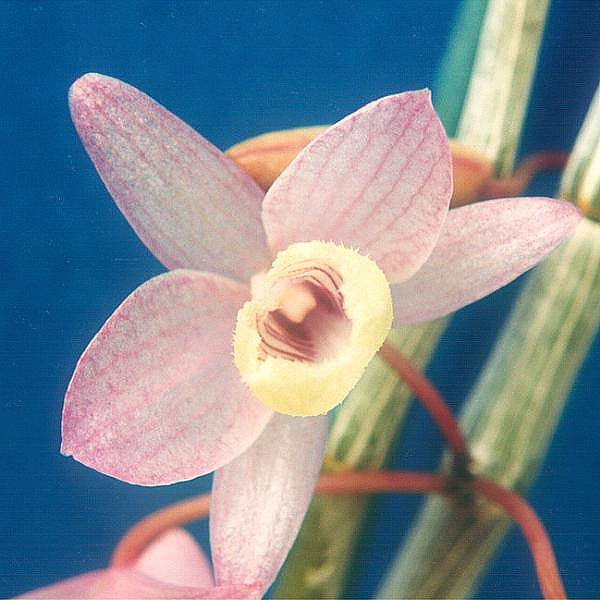
Dendrobium aphyllum the hooded orchid

- Dendrobium aberrans Schltr.
- Dendrobium acaciifolium J.J.Sm.
- Dendrobium acanthophippiiflorum J.J.Sm.
- Dendrobium acerosum Lindl.
- Dendrobium aciculare Lindl.
- Dendrobium acinaciforme Roxb.
- Dendrobium aclinia Rchb.f.
- Dendrobium acuiferum Ormerod
- Dendrobium acuminatissimum (Blume) Lindl.
- Dendrobium acutifolium Ridl.
- Dendrobium acutilingue Schuit. & Peter B.Adams
- Dendrobium acutilobum Schltr.
- Dendrobium acutimentum J.J.Sm.
- Dendrobium acutisepalum J.J.Sm.
- Dendrobium adae F.M.Bailey – slender cane orchid
- Dendrobium adamsii A.D.Hawkes
- Dendrobium aduncilobum J.J.Sm.
- Dendrobium aduncum Lindl.
- Dendrobium aemulum R.Br. – ironbark feather orchid
- Dendrobium affine (Decne.) Steud. – white butterfly orchid
- Dendrobium agamense J.J.Sm.
- Dendrobium agrostophylloides Schltr.
- Dendrobium agrostophyllum F.Muell. – buttercup orchid
- Dendrobium agusanense Ames
- Dendrobium ainiae Rusea & Besi
- Dendrobium ajoebii J.J.Sm.
- Dendrobium alabense J.J.Wood
- Dendrobium alaticaulinum P.Royen
- Dendrobium albayense Ames
- Dendrobium albiflorum Ridl.
- Dendrobium albopurpureum (Seidenf.) Schuit. & Peter B.Adams
- Dendrobium albosanguineum Lindl. & Paxton
- Dendrobium alderwereltianum J.J.Sm.
- Dendrobium alexandrae Schltr.
- Dendrobium aliciae Ames & Quisumb.
- Dendrobium aloifolium (Blume) Rchb.f.
- Dendrobium alticola Schltr.
- Dendrobium amabile (Lour.) O'Brien
- Dendrobium amboinense Hook.
- Dendrobium amethystoglossum Rchb.f.
- Dendrobium amiceanum M.Pignal & Laud.
- Dendrobium amiengense Ormerod
- Dendrobium amoenum Wall. ex Lindl.
- Dendrobium amphigenyum Ridl.
- Dendrobium amplum Lindl.
- Dendrobium anamalayanum Chandrab., V.Chandras. & N.C.Nair
- Dendrobium anceps Sw.
- Dendrobium ancipitum (P.O'Byrne & J.J.Verm.) Schuit. & Peter B.Adams
- Dendrobium × andersonianum F.M.Bailey
- Dendrobium andreemillarae T.M.Reeve
- Dendrobium angiense J.J.Sm.
- Dendrobium angraecifolium Schltr.
- Dendrobium angulatum Lindl.
- Dendrobium angusticaule P.J.Spence
- Dendrobium angustiflorum J.J.Sm.
- Dendrobium angustifolium (Blume) Lindl.
- Dendrobium angustipetalum J.J.Sm.
- Dendrobium angustispathum J.J.Sm.
- Dendrobium angustitepalum (W.K.Harris & M.A.Clem.) Schuit. & de Vogel
- Dendrobium anilii P.M.Salim., J.Mathew & Szlach.
- Dendrobium anisobulbon Schuit. & Peter B.Adams
- Dendrobium annae J.J.Sm.
- Dendrobium annamense Rolfe
- Dendrobium annemarieae Cabactulan, Cootes, M.Leon & Pimentel
- Dendrobium annulatum Juswara, Schuit. & J.Champ.
- Dendrobium annuligerum Rchb.f.
- Dendrobium anosmum Lindl.
- Dendrobium antennatum Lindl. – green antelope orchid
- Dendrobium anthrene Ridl.
- Dendrobium apertum Schltr.
- Dendrobium aphanochilum Kraenzl.
- Dendrobium aphrodite Rchb.f.
- Dendrobium apiculiferum J.J.Sm.
- Dendrobium appendicula Schltr.
- Dendrobium appendiculatum (Blume) Lindl.
- Dendrobium aprinoides J.J.Sm.
- Dendrobium aprinum J.J.Sm.
- Dendrobium aqueum Lindl.
- Dendrobium arachnoideum Schltr.
- Dendrobium araneola Schltr.
- Dendrobium aratriferum J.J.Sm.
- Dendrobium arawanum Ormerod
- Dendrobium archipelagense Howcroft & W.N.Takeuchi
- Dendrobium arcuatum J.J.Sm.
- Dendrobium arfakense J.J.Sm.
- Dendrobium aridum J.J.Sm.
- Dendrobium aristiferum J.J.Sm.
- Dendrobium arjunoense (J.J.Wood & J.B.Comber) Schuit. & Peter B.Adams
- Dendrobium armeniacum P.J.Cribb
- Dendrobium armitiae F.M.Bailey
- Dendrobium aromaticum J.J.Sm.
- Dendrobium arthrobulbum Kraenzl.
- Dendrobium arunachalense C.Deori, S.K.Sarma, Phukan & A.A.Mao
- Dendrobium asahanense Ormerod & Juswara
- Dendrobium asperatum Schltr.
- Dendrobium asphale Rchb.f.
- Dendrobium assamicum S.Chowdhury
- Dendrobium atavus J.J.Sm.
- Dendrobium atjehense J.J.Sm.
- Dendrobium atroviolaceum Rolfe
- Dendrobium attenuatum Lindl.
- Dendrobium aurantiflammeum J.J.Wood
- Dendrobium aurantiiflavum P.Royen
- Dendrobium aurantiiroseum P.Royen ex T.M.Reeve
- Dendrobium × aurantiivinosum P.Royen
- Dendrobium aurantitepetalum de Vogel
- Dendrobium aureilobum J.J.Sm.
- Dendrobium auricolor J.J.Sm.
- Dendrobium auriculatum Ames & Quisumb.
- Dendrobium aurifex Thoerle, Schuit. & Turkel
- Dendrobium austrocaledonicum Schltr.
- Dendrobium awormangae Ormerod
- Dendrobium axillare Schltr.
- Dendrobium ayubii J.B.Comber & J.J.Wood
- Dendrobium azureum Schuit.

== B ==
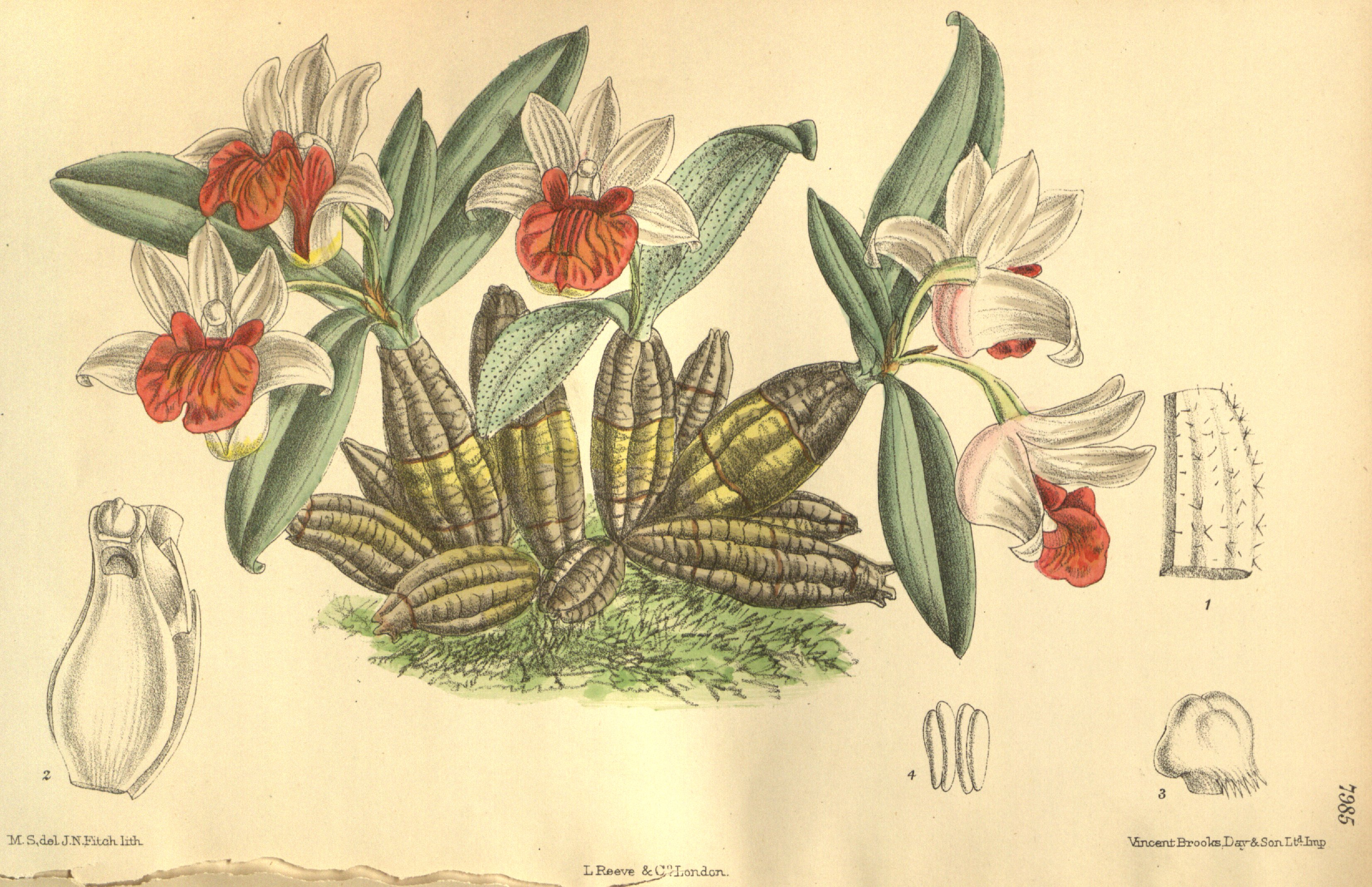
Dendrobium bellatulum

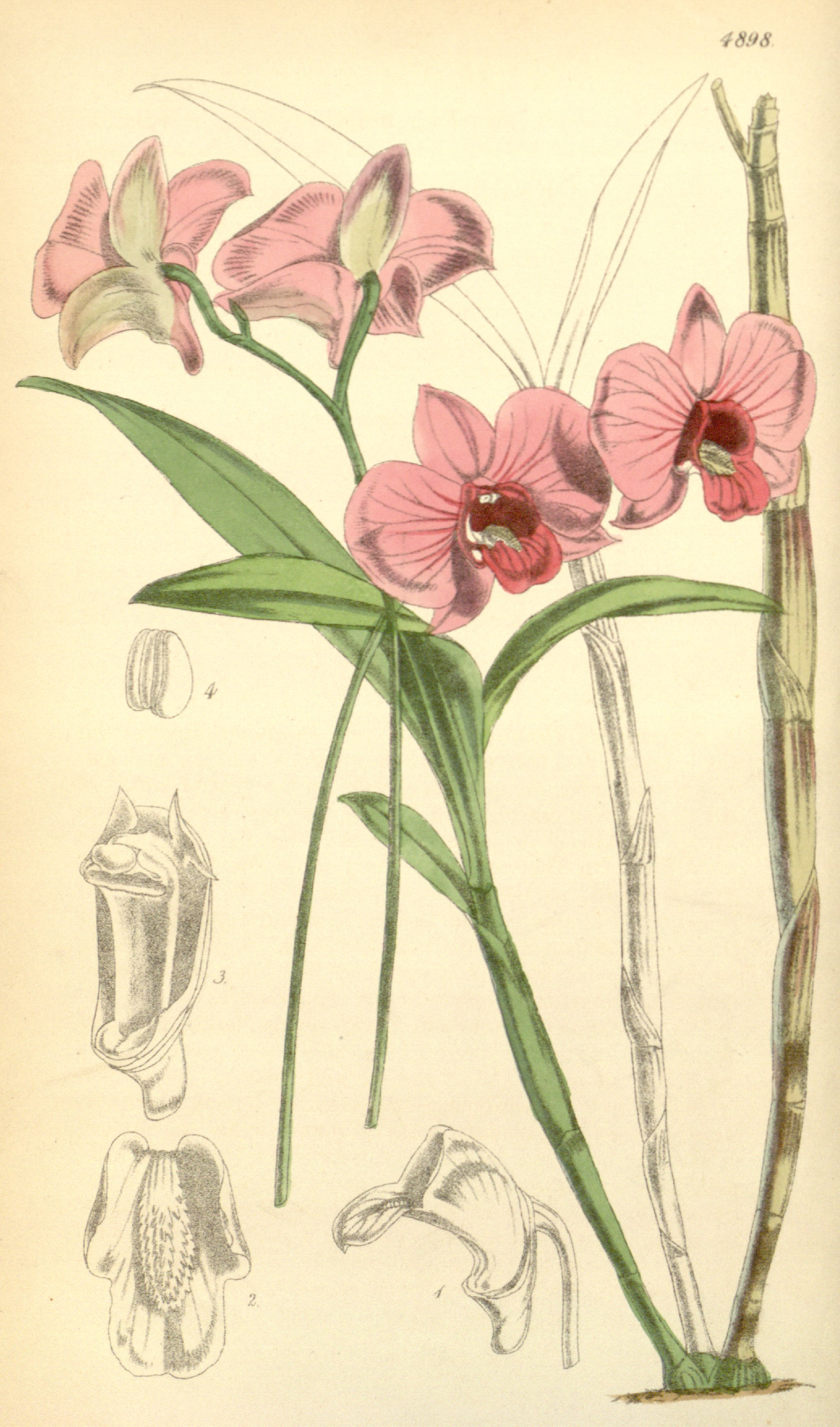
Dendrobium bigibbum

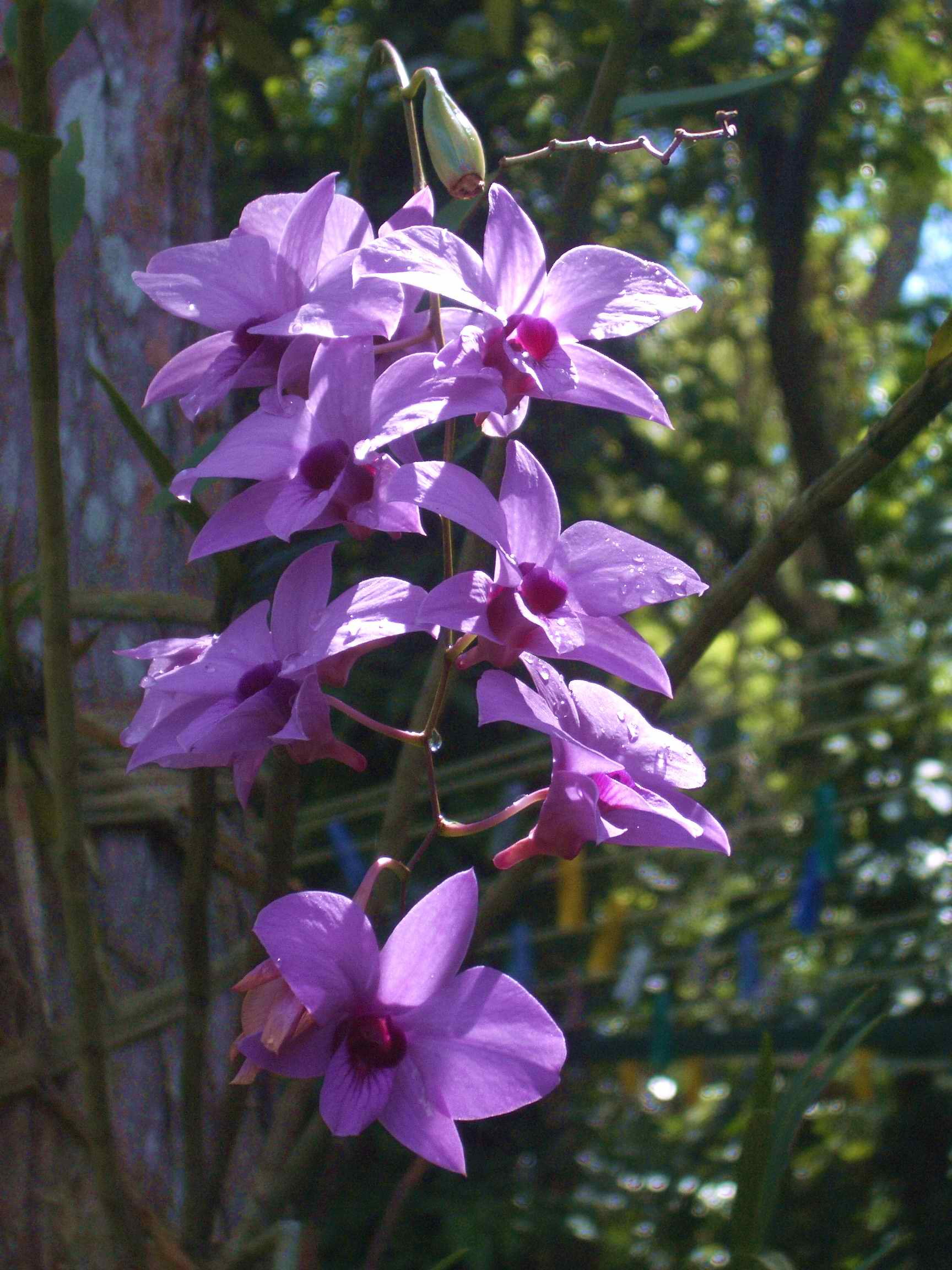
Dendrobium bigibbum

- Dendrobium baeuerlenii F.Muell. & Kraenzl.
- Dendrobium baileyi F.Muell. – blotched gemini orchid
- Dendrobium balimense Ormorod
- Dendrobium bakoense J.J.Wood
- Dendrobium balzerianum Fessel & Lückel
- Dendrobium bambusiforme Schltr.
- Dendrobium bambusinum Ridl.
- Dendrobium bandaense Schltr.
- Dendrobium bandii Cavestro
- Dendrobium banghamii Ames & C.Schweinf.
- Dendrobium bannaense Y.Q.Tian & Y.B.Huang
- Dendrobium baoernianum P.O'Byrne, P.T.Ong & J.J.Wood
- Dendrobium barbatulum Schltr.
- Dendrobium barbatum Breda
- Dendrobium barioense J.J.Wood
- Dendrobium basifixum de Vogel
- Dendrobium basilanense Ames
- Dendrobium beamanianum J.J.Wood & A.L.Lamb
- Dendrobium begaudii (Cavestro) Schuit. & Peter B.Adams
- Dendrobium beleense Ormerod
- Dendrobium bellatulum Rolfe
- Dendrobium bensoniae Rchb.f. – Benson's dendrobium
- Dendrobium bialatum J.J.Sm.
- Dendrobium bicameratum Lindl.
- Dendrobium bicarinatum Ames & C.Schweinf.
- Dendrobium bicaudatum Reinw. ex Lindl.
- Dendrobium bicolense Lubag-Arquiza
- Dendrobium biconvexum (D.L.Jones & M.A.Clem.) J.M.H.Shaw – Mount Windsor rock orchid,
- Dendrobium bicostatum J.J.Sm.
- Dendrobium bicristatum Ormerod
- Dendrobium bidentiferum J.J.Sm.
- Dendrobium bifalce Lindl. – native bee orchid
- Dendrobium biflorum (G.Forst.) Sw.
- Dendrobium bifurcatum T.Yukawa
- Dendrobium bigibbum Lindl.
  - Dendrobium bigibbum var. bigibbum – mauve butterfly orchid
  - Dendrobium bigibbum var. compactum (C.T.White) Peter B.Adams
  - Dendrobium bigibbum var. schroederianum (Rchb.f. ex W.Watson) Peter B.Adams
  - Dendrobium bigibbum var. superbum (Rchb.f. – Cooktown orchid
- Dendrobium bihamulatum J.J.Sm.
- Dendrobium bilobulatum Seidenf.
- Dendrobium bilobum Lindl.
- Dendrobium biloculare J.J.Sm.
- Dendrobium bismarckiense Schltr.
- Dendrobium blanche-amesiae A.D.Hawkes & A.H.Heller
- Dendrobium blaoense Schuit. & Peter B.Adams
- Dendrobium blumei Lindl.
- Dendrobium bobolei Ormerod
- Dendrobium boosii Coates & W.Suarez
- Dendrobium boridiense Ormerod
- Dendrobium bostrychodes Rchb.f.
- Dendrobium bowmanii Benth. – straggly pencil orchid
- Dendrobium brachycalyptra Schltr.
- Dendrobium brachycentrum Ridl.
- Dendrobium brachypus (Endl.) Rchb.f. – Norfolk Island orchid
- Dendrobium bracteosum Rchb.f.
- Dendrobium braianense Gagnep.
- Dendrobium brassii T.M.Reeve & P.Woods
- Dendrobium brevibulbum J.J.Sm.
- Dendrobium brevicaudum D.L.Jones & M.A.Clem. – Mount Finnigan pencil orchid,
- Dendrobium brevicaule Rolfe
  - Dendrobium brevicaule subsp. brevicaule
  - Dendrobium brevicaule subsp. calcarium (J.J.Sm.) T.M.Reeve & P.Woods
  - Dendrobium brevicaule ssp. pentagonum (Kraenzl.) T.M.Reeve & P.Woods
- Dendrobium brevicolle J.J.Sm.
- Dendrobium brevilabium Schltr.
- Dendrobium brevimentum Seidenf.
- Dendrobium brevipetalum de Vogel
- Dendrobium brillianum Ormerod & Cavestro
- Dendrobium brinkmanii Ormerod
- Dendrobium brunnescens Schltr.
- Dendrobium brymerianum Rchb.f.
- Dendrobium buffumiae A.D.Hawkes
- Dendrobium buinense Ormerod
- Dendrobium bukidnonense Ames & Quisumb.
- Dendrobium bulbophylloides Schltr.
- Dendrobium bullenianum Rchb.f.
- Dendrobium burkeanum Ormerod
- Dendrobium bursigerum Lindl.
- Dendrobium busuangense Ames
- Dendrobium butchcamposii Cootes, M.Leon & R.Boos
- Dendrobium butinii M.Pignal & Munzinger

== C ==
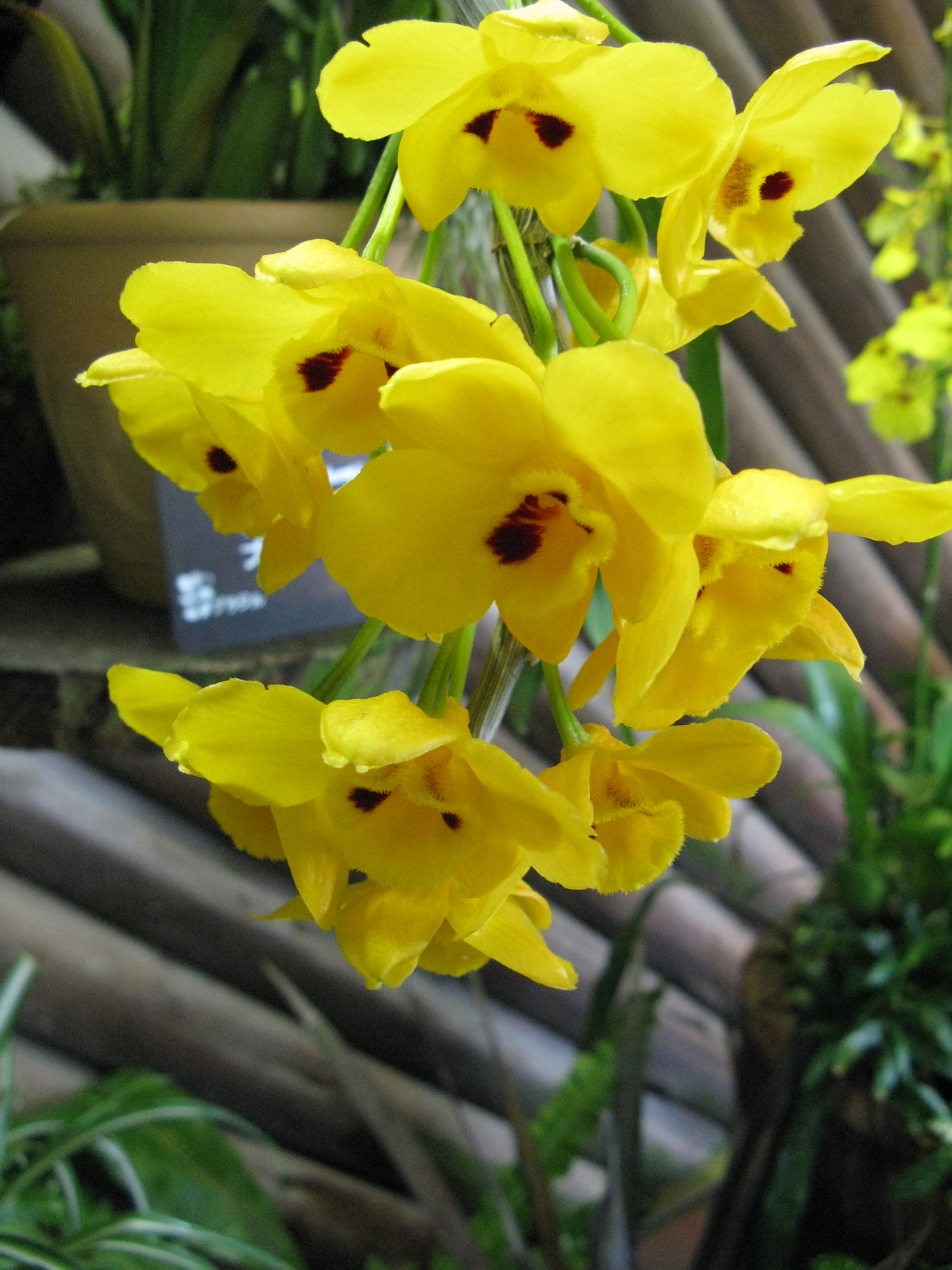
Dendrobium chrysanthum

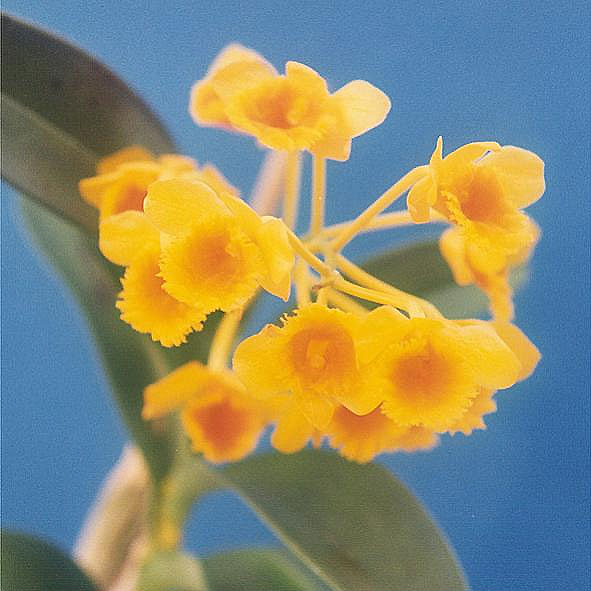
Dendrobium chrysotoxum

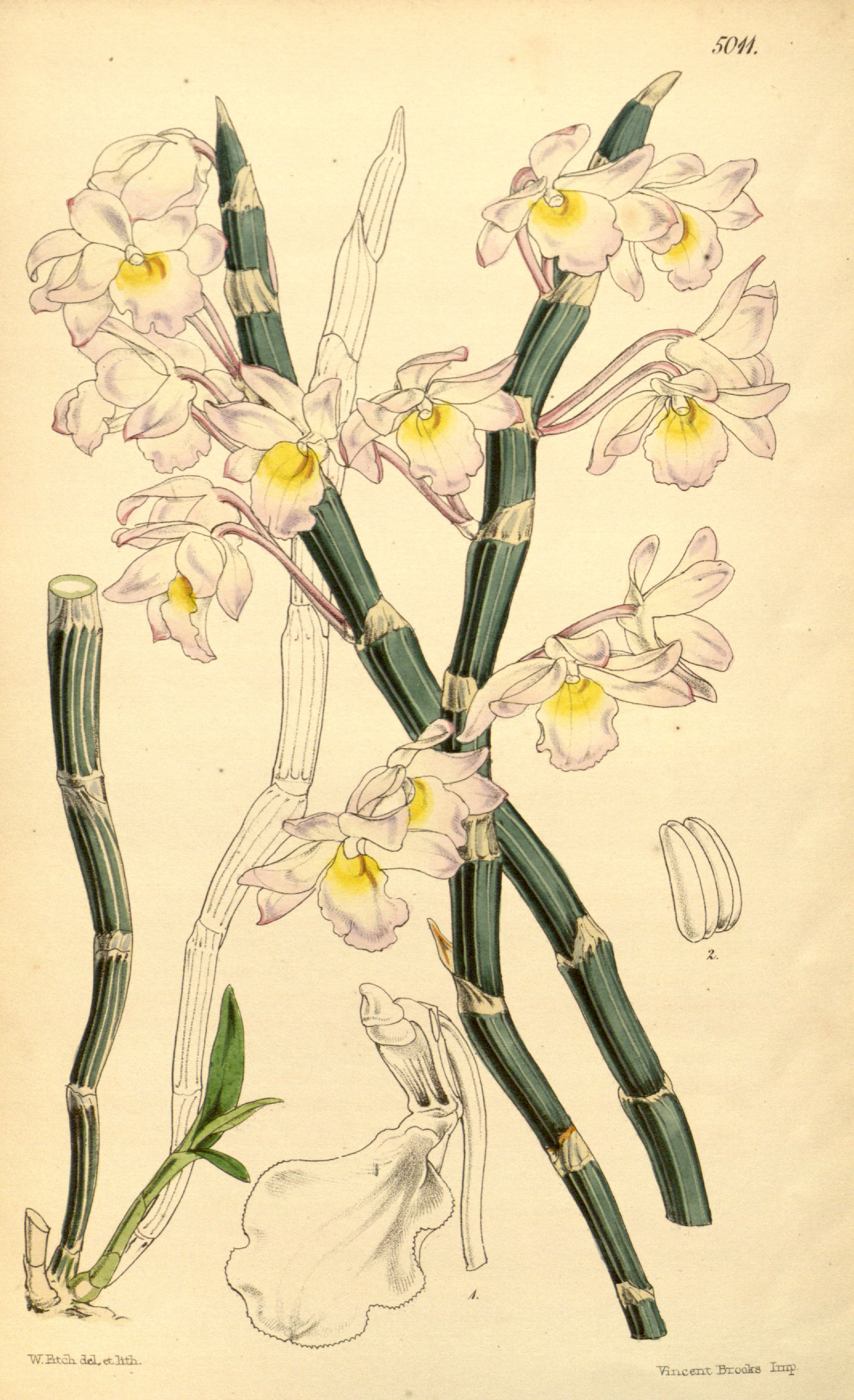
Dendrobium crepidatum

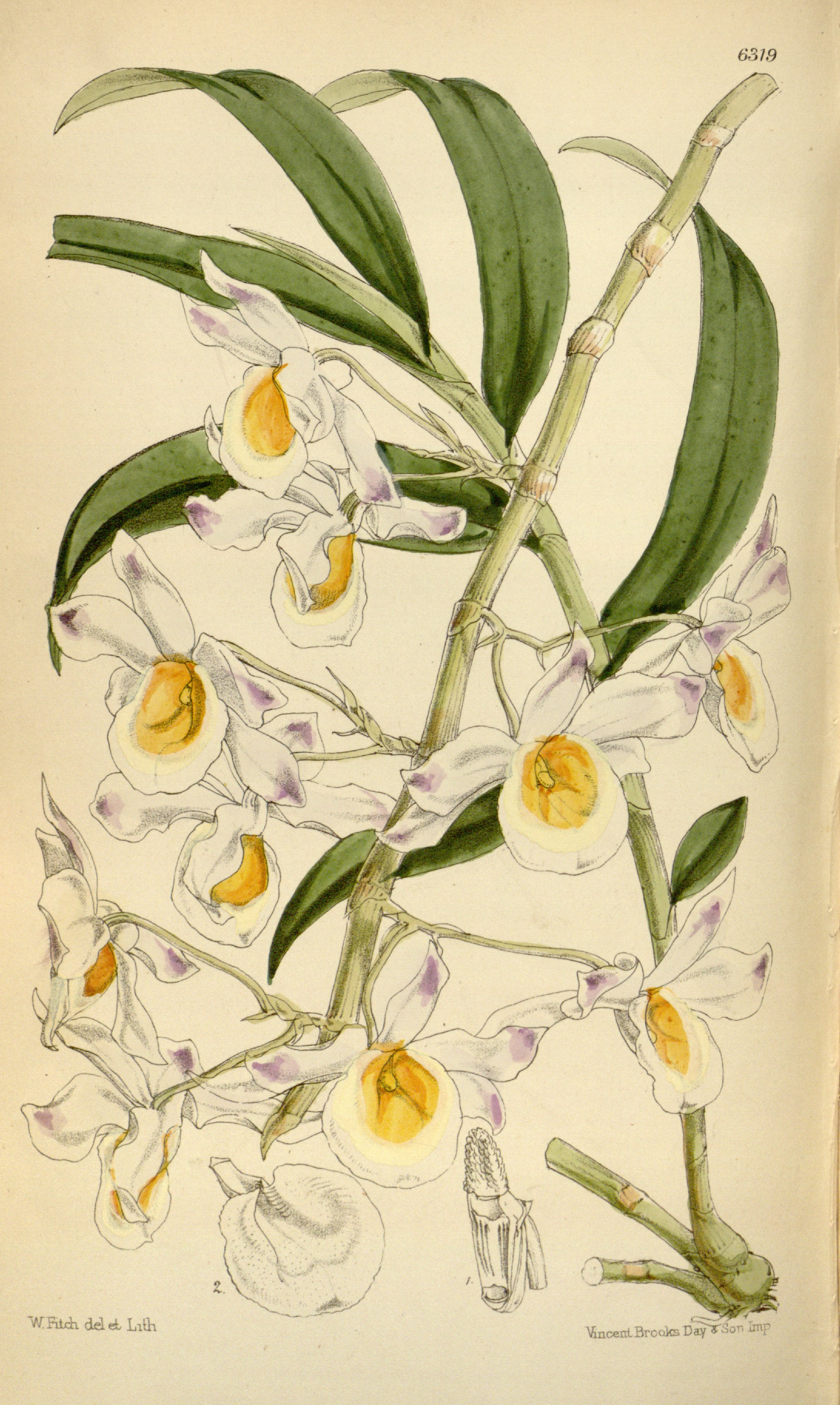
Dendrobium crystallinum

- Dendrobium cabadharense Ames
- Dendrobium cacuminis Gagnep.
- Dendrobium cadetia J.J.Sm.
- Dendrobium cadetiiflorum J.J.Sm.
- Dendrobium cadetioides Schltr.
- Dendrobium caladenia Ormerod
- Dendrobium calcaratimentum P.O'Byrne
- Dendrobium calcaratum A.Rich.
  - Dendrobium calcaratum subsp. calcaratum
  - Dendrobium calcaratum subsp. papillatum Dauncey
- Dendrobium calcariferum Carr
- Dendrobium calceolum Roxb.
- Dendrobium calcicola P.O'Byrne & P.T.Ong
- Dendrobium calicopis Ridl.
- Dendrobium caliculi-mentum R.S.Rogers
- Dendrobium callitrophilum B.Gray & D.L.Jones – thin feather orchid
- Dendrobium calocephalum (Z.H.Tsi & S.C.Chem) Schuit. & Peter B.Adams
- Dendrobium calophyllum Rchb.f.
- Dendrobium calopogon Rchb.f.
- Dendrobium calyptratum J.J.Sm.
- Dendrobium camaridiorum Rchb.f.
- Dendrobium campbellii P.J.Cribb & B.A.Lewis
- Dendrobium canaliculatum R.Br.
  - Dendrobium canaliculatum var. canaliculatum – brown tea tree orchid
  - Dendrobium canaliculatum var. foelschei (F.Muell.) Rupp & T.E.Hunt – thin tea tree orchid
- Dendrobium cancroides T.E.Hunt – crab orchid
- Dendrobium candidissimum Cavestro & J.Champ.
- Dendrobium candoonense Ames
- Dendrobium capillipes Rchb.f.
- Dendrobium capitellatoides J.J.Sm.
- Dendrobium capituliflorum Rolfe
- Dendrobium capra J.J.Sm.
- Dendrobium carinatum (L.) Willd.
- Dendrobium cariniferum Rchb.f.
- Dendrobium carinulatidiscum J.J.Sm.
- Dendrobium carmindae M.Leon
- Dendrobium carnicarinum Kores
- Dendrobium carolinense Schltr.
- Dendrobium carrii Rupp & C.T.White – furrowed moon orchid
- Dendrobium carronii Lavarack & P.J.Cribb – pink tea tree orchid
- Dendrobium caryicola Guillaumin.
- Dendrobium casuarinae Schltr.
- Dendrobium catillare Rchb.f.
- Dendrobium caudiculatum (M.A.Clem. & D.L.Jones) Schuit. & de Vogel
- Dendrobium cavipes J.J.Sm.
- Dendrobium celebense J.J.Sm.
- Dendrobium centrale J.J.Sm.
- Dendrobium centrosepalum Schuit., Juswara & Droissart
- Dendrobium ceraceum Schltr.
- Dendrobium ceratostyloides J.J.Sm.
- Dendrobium ceraula Rchb.f.
- Dendrobium cerinum Rchb.f.
- Dendrobium cervicaliferum J.J.Sm.
- Dendrobium chalmersii F.Muell.
- Dendrobium chamaephytum Schltr.
- Dendrobium chameleon Ames
- Dendrobium chapaense Aver.
- Dendrobium chewiorum J.J.Wood & A.L.Lamb
- Dendrobium chiangdaoense Promm., Kidyoo, Buddh. & Suddee
- Dendrobium chiengmaiense Schuit. & Peter B.Adams
- Dendrobium chionanthum Schltr.
- Dendrobium chittimae Seidenf.
- Dendrobium chloranthum Schuit. & Peter B.Adams
- Dendrobium chordiforme Kraenzl.
- Dendrobium christyanum Rchb.f.
- Dendrobium chrysanthum Wall. ex Lindl.
- Dendrobium chryseum Rolfe
- Dendrobium chrysobulbon Schltr.
- Dendrobium chrysocrepis C.S.P.Parish & Rchb.f. ex Hook.f.
- Dendrobium chrysographatum Ames
- Dendrobium chrysopterum Schuit. & de Vogel
- Dendrobium chrysosema Schltr.
- Dendrobium chrysotainium Schltr.
- Dendrobium chrysotoxum Lindl.
- Dendrobium chrysotropis Schltr.
- Dendrobium ciliatilabellum Seidenf.
- Dendrobium cinnabarinum Rchb.f.
  - Dendrobium cinnabarinum var. angustitepalum Carr
  - Dendrobium cinnabarinum var. cinnabarinum
- Dendrobium clausum Schltr.
- Dendrobium clavator Ridl.
- Dendrobium clavuligerum J.J.Sm.
- Dendrobium cleistanthum de Vogel, E.Winkel & Vugt
- Dendrobium cleistogamum Schltr.
- Dendrobium clemensiae Ames
- Dendrobium clementsii (D.L.Jones) J.M.H.Shaw – Cape York crimp orchid
- Dendrobium closterium Rchb.f.
  - Dendrobium closterium var. closterium
  - Dendrobium closterium var. jocosum (Rchb.f.) N.Hallé
- Dendrobium cobra Ormerod
- Dendrobium cochleatum J.J.Sm.
- Dendrobium cochliodes Schltr.
- Dendrobium codonosepalum J.J.Sm.
- Dendrobium coelandria Kraenzl.
- Dendrobium coeloglossum Schltr.
- Dendrobium collinsii (Lavarack) Schuit. & Peter B.Adams – McIlwraith burr orchid
- Dendrobium comatum (Blume) Lindl.
- Dendrobium compactum Rolfe ex Hemsl.
- Dendrobium compressibulbum Schuit. & Peter B.Adams
- Dendrobium compressicaule J.J.Sm.
- Dendrobium compressimentum J.J.Sm.
- Dendrobium compressistylum J.J.Sm.
- Dendrobium compressum Lindl.
- Dendrobium conanthum Schltr.
- Dendrobium concavum J.J.Sm.
- Dendrobium concolor (Z.H.Tsa & S.C.Chen) Schuit. & Peter B.Adams
- Dendrobium confinale Kerr
- Dendrobium confluens J.J.Sm.
- Dendrobium confundens Kraenzl.
- Dendrobium conicum J.J.Sm.
- Dendrobium connatum (Blume) Lindl.
  - Dendrobium connatum var. connatum
  - Dendrobium connatum var. distachyon (Lindl.) P.O'Byrne
- Dendrobium conspicuum Bakh.f.
- Dendrobium constrictum J.J.Sm.
- Dendrobium contextum Schuit. & de Vogel ex J.M.H.Shaw
- Dendrobium convexipes J.J.Sm.
- Dendrobium convexum (Blume) Lindl. – piggyback orchid
- Dendrobium convolutum Rolfe
- Dendrobium corallorhizon J.J.Sm.
- Dendrobium coriaceum (D.L.Jones & M.A.Clem.) J.M.H.Shaw – inland rock orchid
- Dendrobium correllianum A.D.Hawkes & A.H.Heller
- Dendrobium corrugatilobum J.J.Sm.
- Dendrobium corticicola Schltr.
- Dendrobium corydaliflorum J.J.Wood
- Dendrobium courtauldii Summerh. ex J.J.Wood
- Dendrobium cowenii P.O'Byrne & J.J.Verm.
- Dendrobium crabro Ridl.
- Dendrobium crassicaule Schltr.
- Dendrobium crassiflorum J.J.Sm.
- Dendrobium crassifolium Schltr.
- Dendrobium crassilabium P.J.Spence
- Dendrobium crassimarginatum L.O.Williams
- Dendrobium crassinervium J.J.Sm.
- Dendrobium crassulum (Schltr.) J.J.Sm.
- Dendrobium crenatifolium J.J.Sm.
- Dendrobium crenatilabre J.J.Sm.
- Dendrobium crenatilobum (P.O'Byrne & J.J.Verm.) Schuit. & Peter B.Adams
- Dendrobium crenicristatum Ridl.
- Dendrobium crenulatum J.J.Sm.
- Dendrobium crepidatum Lindl. & Paxton
- Dendrobium crispatum (G.Forst.) Sw.
- Dendrobium crispilinguum P.J.Cribb
- Dendrobium crispum Dalzell
- Dendrobium crocatum Hook.f.
- Dendrobium croceocentrum J.J.Sm.
- Dendrobium cromwellense de Vogel
- Dendrobium crucilabre J.J.Sm.
- Dendrobium cruentum Rchb.f.
- Dendrobium crumenatum Sw. – pigeon orchid
- Dendrobium cruttwellii T.M.Reeve
- Dendrobium crystallinum Rchb.f.
- Dendrobium cuculliferum J.J.Sm.
- Dendrobium cucullitepalum J.J.Sm.
- Dendrobium cucumerinum MacLeay ex Lindl. – cucumber orchid
- Dendrobium cultrifolium Schltr.
- Dendrobium cumulatum Lindl.
- Dendrobium cuneatum Schltr.
- Dendrobium cuneilabium (Schltr.) J.J.Sm.
- Dendrobium cuneilabrum J.J.Sm.
- Dendrobium cunninghamii Lindl.
- Dendrobium curviflorum Rolfe
- Dendrobium curvimentum J.J.Sm.
- Dendrobium curvisepalum Ridl.
- Dendrobium curvum Ridl.
- Dendrobium cuspidatum Lindl.
- Dendrobium cuthbertsonii F.Muell.
- Dendrobium cyanocentrum Schltr.
- Dendrobium cyanopterum Kraenzl.
- Dendrobium cyatopoides J.J.Sm.
- Dendrobium cyclobulbon Schltr.
- Dendrobium cyclolobum Schltr.
- Dendrobium cyclopense J.J.Sm.
- Dendrobium cylindricum J.J.Sm.
- Dendrobium cymatoleguum Schltr.
- Dendrobium cymbicallum P.O'Byrne & J.J.Wood
- Dendrobium cymbidioides (Blume) Lindl.
- Dendrobium cymbiforme Rolfe
- Dendrobium cymboglossum J.J.Wood & A.L.Lamb
- Dendrobium cymbulipes J.J.Sm.
- Dendrobium cyrilianum P.O'Byrne, Gokusing & J.J.Wood
- Dendrobium cyrtolobum Schltr.
- Dendrobium cyrtosepalum Schltr.
- Dendrobium cyrusianum P.O'Byrne, Gosuking & J.J.Wood

== D ==
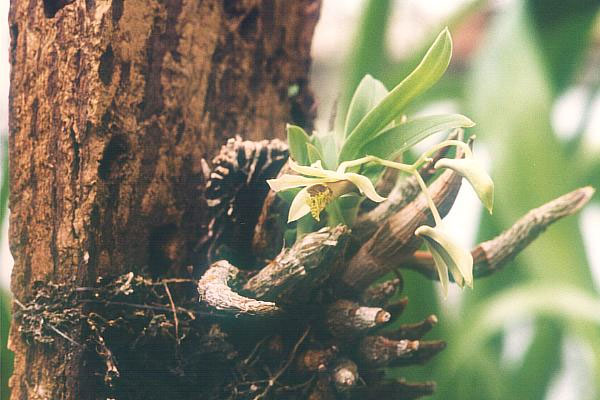
Dendrobium delacourii

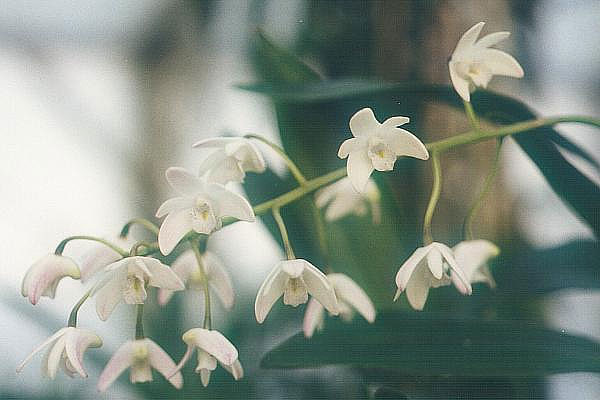
Dendrobium × delicatum, a natural hybrid between D. kingianum and D. tarberi

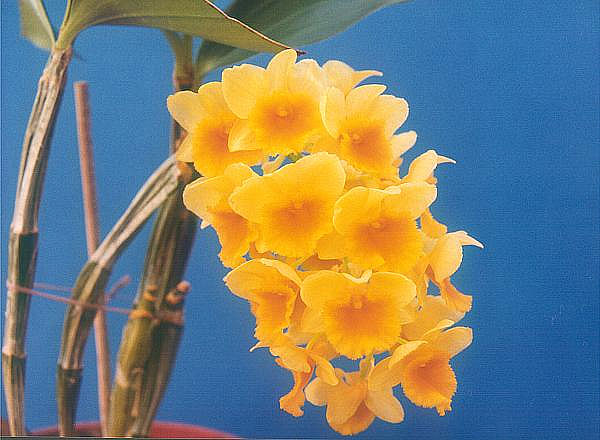
Dendrobium densiflorum

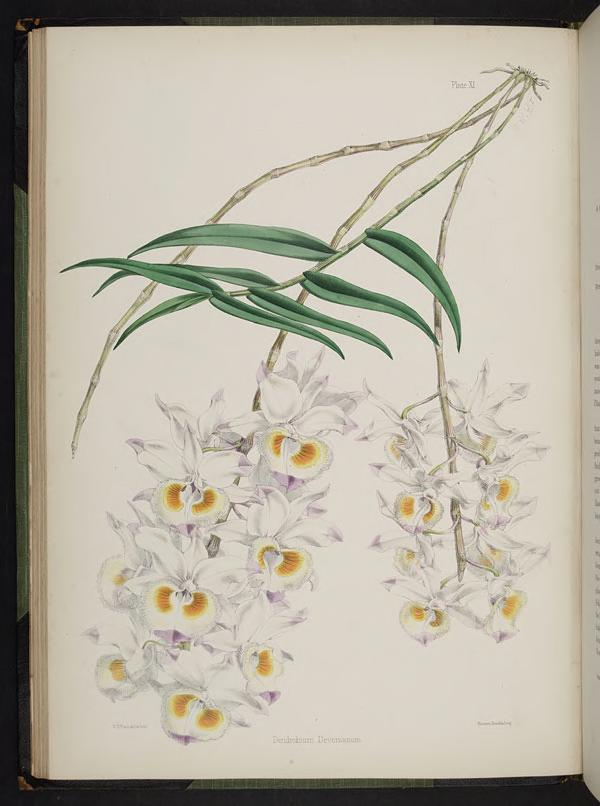
Dendrobium devonianum

- Dendrobium dactyliferum Rchb.f.
- Dendrobium dactylodes Rchb.f.
- Dendrobium daenikerianum Kraenzl.
- Dendrobium dahlemense Schltr.
- Dendrobium daimandaui J.J.Wood
- Dendrobium dalatense Gagnep.
- Dendrobium dangioanum M.Pignal
- Dendrobium danipense Ormerod
- Dendrobium dantaniense Guillaumin
- Dendrobium darjeelingensis Pradhan
- Dendrobium davaoense Lubag-Arquiza
- Dendrobium dearei Rchb.f.
- Dendrobium debile Schltr.
- Dendrobium decoratum (M.A.Clem. & Cootes) Schuit. & Peter B.Adams
- Dendrobium decumbens Schltr.
  - Dendrobium decumbens var. decumbens
  - Dendrobium decumbens var. stenophyllum Schltr.
- Dendrobium dedeksantosoi Metusala
- Dendrobium deflexilobum J.J.Wood & A.L.Lamb
- Dendrobium dekockii J.J.Sm.
- Dendrobium delacourii Guillaumin
- Dendrobium deleonii Cabactulam, Cootes & R.B.Pimentel
- Dendrobium deltatum Seidenf.
- Dendrobium dempoense J.J.Sm.
- Dendrobium dendrocolla J.J.Sm.
- Dendrobium dendrocolloides J.J.Sm.
- Dendrobium denigratum J.J.Sm.
- Dendrobium denneanum Kerr
- Dendrobium densiflorum Lindl. – pineapple orchid
- Dendrobium dentatum Seidenf.
- Dendrobium denudans D.Don
- Dendrobium deplanchei Rchb.f.
- Dendrobium derekcabactulanii Cootes, Pimentel & M.Leon
- Dendrobium derryi Ridl.
- Dendrobium devogelii J.J.Wood
- Dendrobium devonianum Paxton
- Dendrobium devosianum J.J.Sm.
- Dendrobium dianiae P.O'Byrne & Wood
- Dendrobium diaphanum Schltr.
- Dendrobium diceras Schltr.
- Dendrobium dichaeoides Schltr.
- Dendrobium dichroma Schltr.
- Dendrobium dichrotropis Schltr.
- Dendrobium dicuphum F.Muell.
- Dendrobium dielsianum Schltr.
- Dendrobium diffusum L.O.Williams
- Dendrobium dilatatocolle J.J.Sm.
- Dendrobium dimorphum J.J.Sm.
- Dendrobium diodon Rchb.f.
  - Dendrobium diodon ssp. diodon
  - Dendrobium diodon ssp. kodayarensis Gopalan & A.N.Henry
- Dendrobium dionaeoides J.J.Sm.
- Dendrobium discerptum J.J.Sm.
- Dendrobium discolor Lindl. – antler orchids
  - Dendrobium discolor var. broomfieldii (Fitzg.) A.D.Hawkes – canary orchid
  - Dendrobium discolor subsp. discolor – golden antler orchid
  - Dendrobium discolor var. fimbrilabium (Rchb.f.) Dockrill
  - Dendrobium discolor var. fuscum (Fitzg.) Dockrill – brown antler orchid
  - Dendrobium discolor subsp. incurvata Liddle & P.I.Forst.
- Dendrobium disoides Schltr.
- Dendrobium dissitifolium Ridl.
- Dendrobium distichum (C.Presl.) Rchb.f.
- Dendrobium ditschiense J.J.Sm.
- Dendrobium dixanthum Rchb.f.
- Dendrobium dixonianum Rolfe ex Downie
- Dendrobium djamuense Schltr.
- Dendrobium dockrillii Ormerod
- Dendrobium doloissumbinii J.J.Wood
- Dendrobium × donnesiae Mast.
- Dendrobium doormanii J.J.Sm.
- Dendrobium doormantopense Ormerod
- Dendrobium draconis Rchb.f.
- Dendrobium dulce J.J.Sm.
- Dendrobium dupense de Vogel
- Dendrobium durum J.J.Sm.

== E ==
- Dendrobium eboracense Kraenzl.
- Dendrobium echinocarpum (Schltr.) J.J.Sm.
- Dendrobium ecolle J.J.Sm.
- Dendrobium efogiense Ormerod
- Dendrobium eksanianum P.J.Spence
- Dendrobium elatum Schltr.
- Dendrobium elineae (Calaramo, Naive, Cootes & J.C.Martyr) Naive & Calaramo
- Dendrobium elliottianum P.O'Byrne
- Dendrobium ellipsophyllum Tang & F.T.Wang
- Dendrobium elongaticolle Schltr.
  - Dendrobium elongatum var elongatum
  - Dendrobium elongatum var orientale J.J.Sm.
- Dendrobium emarginatum J.W.Moore
- Dendrobium endertii J.J.Sm.
- Dendrobium engae T.M.Reeve
- Dendrobium enigmaticum Ormerod
- Dendrobium ephemerum (J.J.Sm.) J.J.Sm.
- Dendrobium epiphyticum (D.L.Jones & M.A.Clem.) J.M.H.Shaw – Illawarra rock orchid
- Dendrobium equitans Kraenzl.
- Dendrobium erectifolium J.J.Sm.
- Dendrobium erectilobum P.J.Spence
- Dendrobium erectopatens J.J.Sm.
- Dendrobium erectum Schltr.
- Dendrobium eriiflorum Griff.
- Dendrobium eriopexis Schltr.
- Dendrobium erostelle Seidenf.
- Dendrobium erosum (Blume) Lindl.
- Dendrobium erubescens Schltr.
- Dendrobium erythraeum Schuit. & de Vogel
- Dendrobium erythropogon Rchb.f.
- Dendrobium erythrosema (P.O'Byrne & J.J.Verm.) Schuit. & Peter B.Adams
- Dendrobium escritorii Ames
- Dendrobium eserre Seidenf.
- Dendrobium esuriens Rchb.f.
- Dendrobium eumelinum Schltr.
- Dendrobium eurorum Ames
- Dendrobium euryanthum Schltr.
- Dendrobium exasperatum Schltr.
- Dendrobium exile Schltr.
- Dendrobium exilifolium Ames & C.Scheinf.
- Dendrobium eximium Schltr.
- Dendrobium extra-axillare Schltr.
- Dendrobium eymanum Ormerod

== F ==
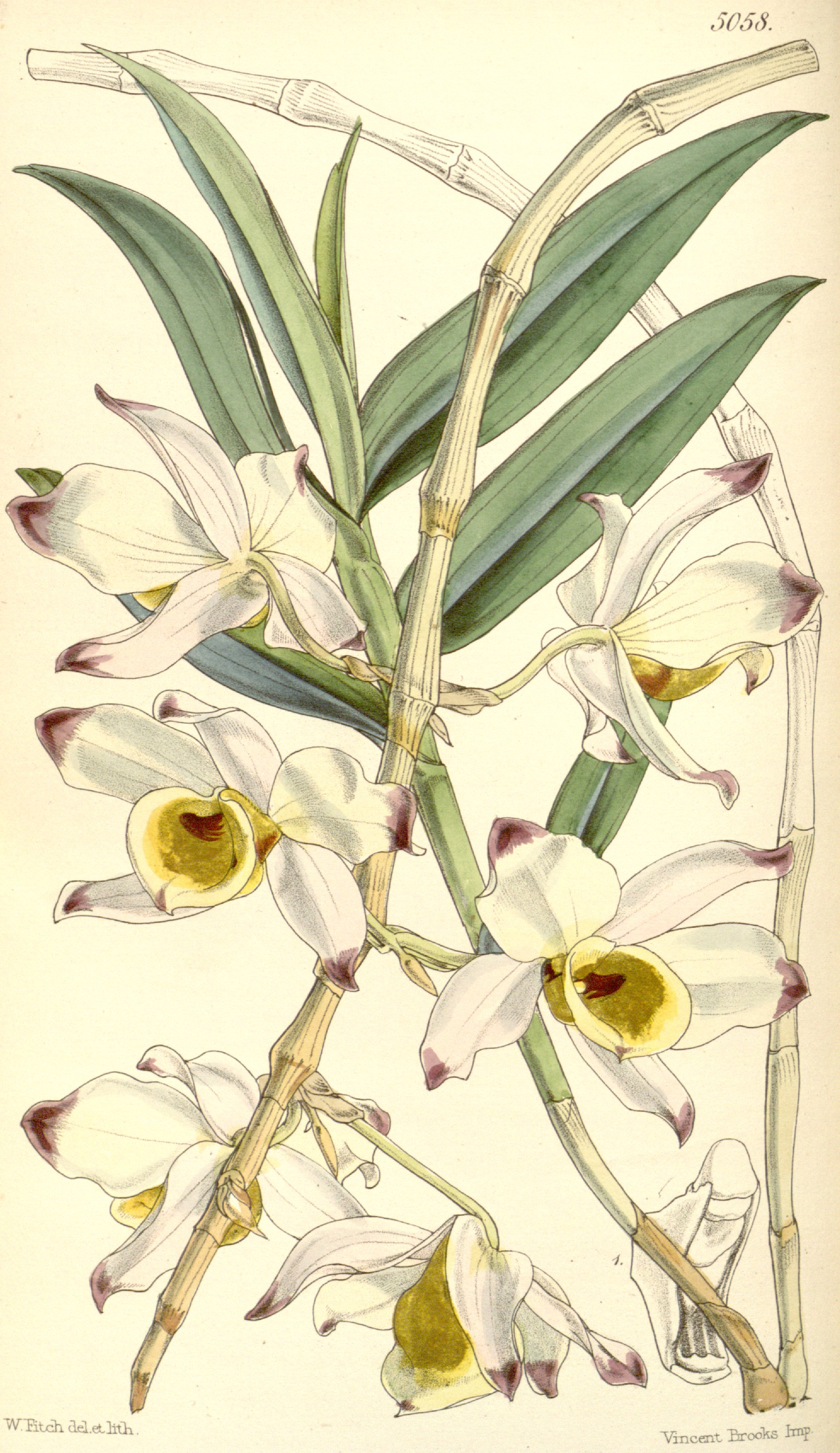
Dendrobium falconeri

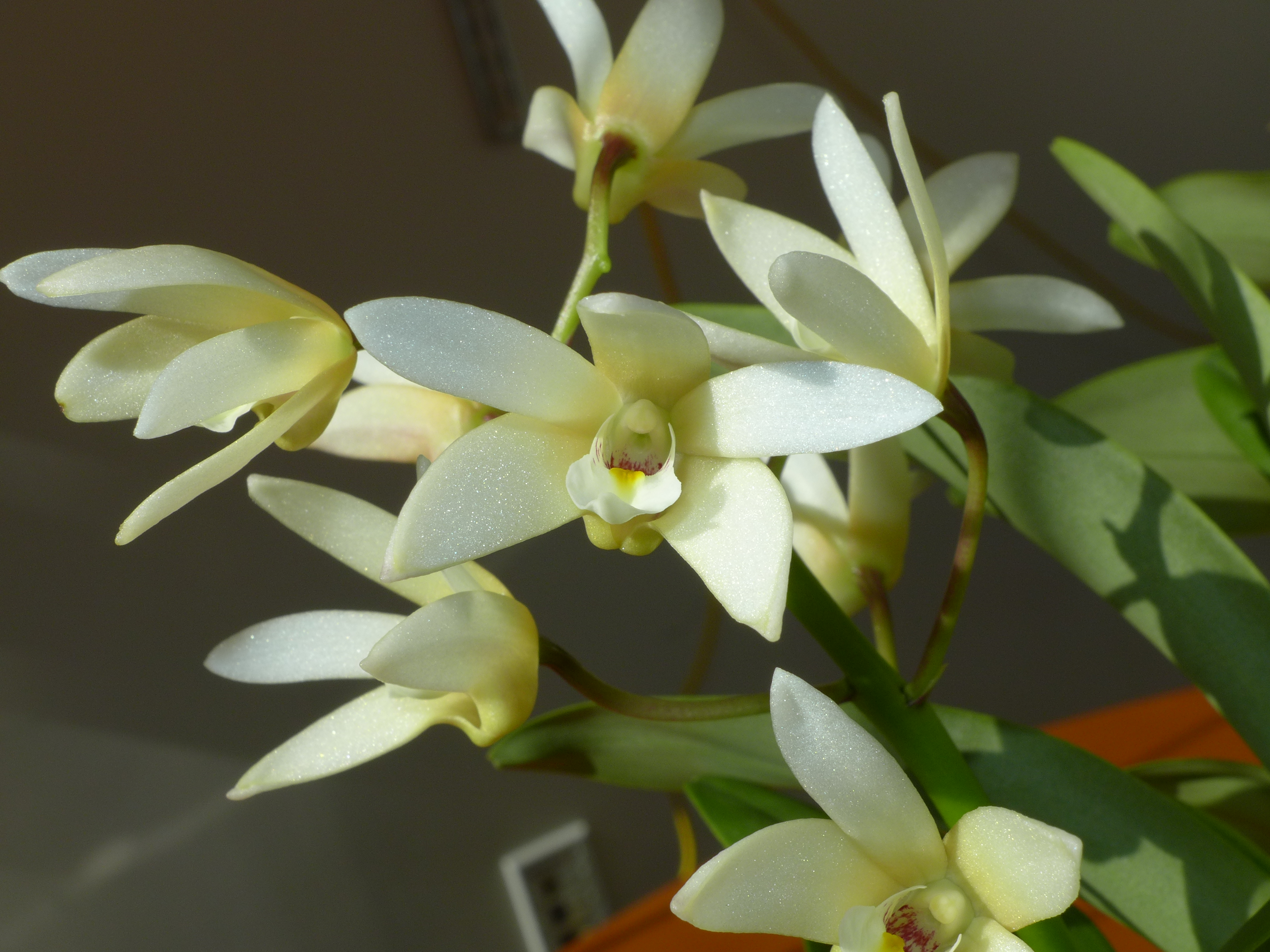
Dendrobium falcorostrum

- Dendrobium faciferum J.J.Sm.
- Dendrobium fairchildiae Ames & Quisumb.
- Dendrobium falcatum J.J.Sm.
- Dendrobium falcipetalum Schltr.
- Dendrobium falconeri Hook.
- Dendrobium falcorostrum Fitzg. – beech orchid
- Dendrobium fallacinum Ormerod
- Dendrobium fanjingshanense Z.H.Tsi ex X.H.Jin & Y.W.Zhang
- Dendrobium fargesii Finet
- Dendrobium farinatum Schild. & Schraut
- Dendrobium fariniferum Schltr.
- Dendrobium farmeri Paxton
- Dendrobium fellowsii F.Muell. – native damsel orchid
- Dendrobium fililobum F.Muell.
- Dendrobium fimbriatum Hook.
- Dendrobium fimbrilabium J.J.Sm.
- Dendrobium findlayanum C.S.P.Parish & Rchb.f.
- Dendrobium finetianum Schltr.
- Dendrobium finisterrae Schltr.
- Dendrobium finniganense D.L.Jones – Mount Finnigan cane orchid
- Dendrobium fissum Schltr.
- Dendrobium fitrianum Juswara, Schuit., P.O'Byrne & J.Champ.
- Dendrobium flabelliforme Schltr.
- Dendrobium flabelloides J.J.Sm.
- Dendrobium flagellum Schltr.
- Dendrobium flavicolle Schltr.
- Dendrobium flabiliflorum Ormerod
- Dendrobium fleckeri Rupp & C.T.White – apricot cane orchid
- Dendrobium flexicaule Z.H.Tsi ex S.C.Sun & L.G.Xu
- Dendrobium flexile Ridl.
- Dendrobium floresianum Metusala & P.O'Byrne
- Dendrobium flos-wanua Metusala & P.O'Byrne
- Dendrobium fluctuosum J.J.Sm.
- Dendrobium × foederatum St.Cloud
- Dendrobium foetens Kraenzl.
- Dendrobium forbesii Ridl.
  - Dendrobium forbesii var. forbesii
  - Dendrobium forbesii var. praestans Schltr.
- Dendrobium formosum Roxb. ex Lindl.
- Dendrobium forrestii (Ormerod) Schuit. & Peter B.Adams
- Dendrobium foxii Ridl.
- Dendrobium fractiflexum Finet
- Dendrobium fractum T.M.Reeve
- Dendrobium franssenianum J.J.Sm.
- Dendrobium friedricksianum Rchb.f.
- Dendrobium fruticicola J.J.Sm.
- Dendrobium fruticosum Schuit. & de Vogel
- Dendrobium fugax Rchb.f.
- Dendrobium fulgescens J.J.Sm.
- Dendrobium fulgidum Schltr.
  - Dendrobium fulgidum subsp. fulgidum
  - Dendrobium fulgidum subsp. maritimum (J.J.Sm.) Dauncey
- Dendrobium fuligineum J.J.Sm.
- Dendrobium fuliginosum (M.A.Clem. & D.L.Jones) P.F.Hunt
- Dendrobium fulminicaule J.J.Sm.
- Dendrobium funiforme Blume
- Dendrobium furcatopedicellatum Hayata
- Dendrobium furcatum Reinw. ex Lindl.
- Dendrobium furfuriferum J.J.Sm.
- Dendrobium fuscescens Griff.
- Dendrobium fuscifaucium Souvann. & Kumar
- Dendrobium fusciflorum Ormerod
- Dendrobium fytchianum Bateman ex Rchb.f.

== G ==
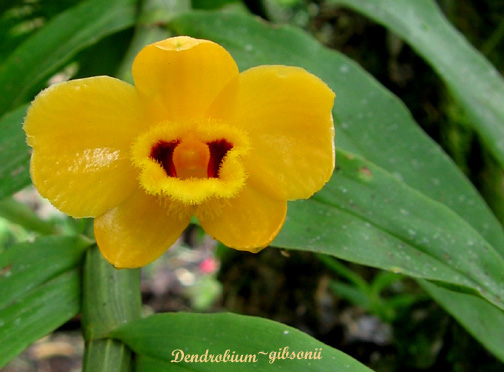
Dendrobium gibsonii

- Dendrobium gaoligongense (Hong Yu & S.G.Zhang) Schuit. & Peter B.Adams
- Dendrobium garrettii Seidenf.
- Dendrobium gatiense Schltr.
- Dendrobium gayoense Handoyo, Cootes & Yudistira
- Dendrobium gemellum Lindl.
- Dendrobium geminatum (Blume) Lindl.
- Dendrobium gemmiferum Kraenzl.
- Dendrobium georgei J.Matthew
- Dendrobium geotropum T.M.Reeve
- Dendrobium gerlandianum Kraenzl.
- Dendrobium gibbiferum J.J.Sm.
- Dendrobium gibbosum Gilli
- Dendrobium gibsonii Paxton
- Dendrobium ginalopeziae (Cootes, M.Leon & Naive) Naive & Alejandro
- Dendrobium gintingii Cavestro & Ormerod
- Dendrobium giriwoense J.J.Sm.
- Dendrobium gjellerupii J.J.Sm.
- Dendrobium glabrum J.J.Sm. – creeping star orchid
- Dendrobium glaucoviride J.J.Sm.
- Dendrobium glebulosum Schltr.
- Dendrobium globiflorum Schltr.
- Dendrobium glomeratum H.J.Veitch ex Rob.
- Dendrobium glomeroides Ormerod
- Dendrobium glossorhynchoides Schltr.
- Dendrobium gnomus Ames
- Dendrobium gobiense Schltr.
- Dendrobium goilalae Ormerod
- Dendrobium goldfinchii F.Muell.
- Dendrobium goldschmidtianum Kraenzl.
- Dendrobium goliathense J.J.Sm.
- Dendrobium goodallianum de Vogel, E.Winkel & Vugt
- Dendrobium gopalanii M.Sulaiman & Murugan
- Dendrobium gouldii Rchb.f.
- Dendrobium gracile (Blume) Lindl.
- Dendrobium gracilentum Schltr.
- Dendrobium gracilicaule F.Muell.
  - Dendrobium gracilicaule var. gracilicaule – blotched cane orchid
  - Dendrobium gracilicaule var. howeanum Maiden – yellow cane orchid
- Dendrobium gracilicolle Schltr.
- Dendrobium gracilipes Burkill
- Dendrobium × gracillimum (Rupp) Leaney
- Dendrobium gramineum Ridl.
- Dendrobium grande Hook.f.
- Dendrobium grastidioides J.J.Sm.
- Dendrobium gratiosissimum Rchb.f.
- Dendrobium greenianum P.J.Cribb & B.A.Lewis
- Dendrobium gregulus Seidenf.
- Dendrobium griffithianum Lindl.
- Dendrobium × grimesii C.T.White & Summerh.
- Dendrobium grootingsii J.J.Sm.
- Dendrobium grossum Schltr.
- Dendrobium guamense Ames
- Dendrobium guerreroi Ames & Quisumb.
- Dendrobium guibertii Carrière
- Dendrobium guttenbergii J.J.Sm.
- Dendrobium guttulatum Schltr.
- Dendrobium gynoglottis Carr

== H ==
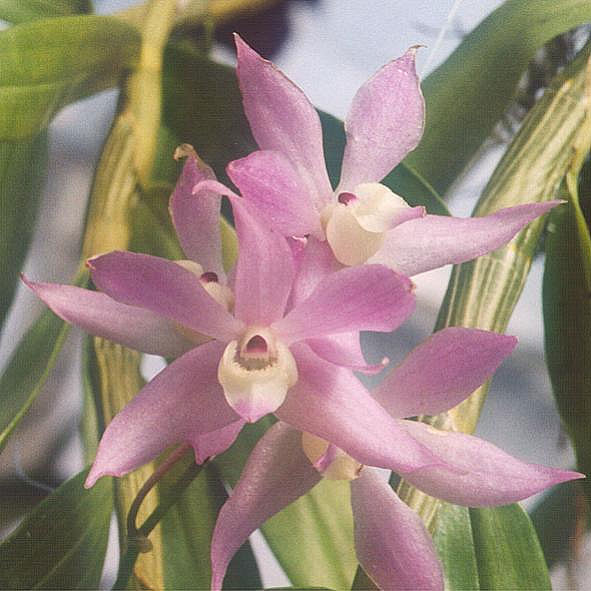
Dendrobium hercoglossum

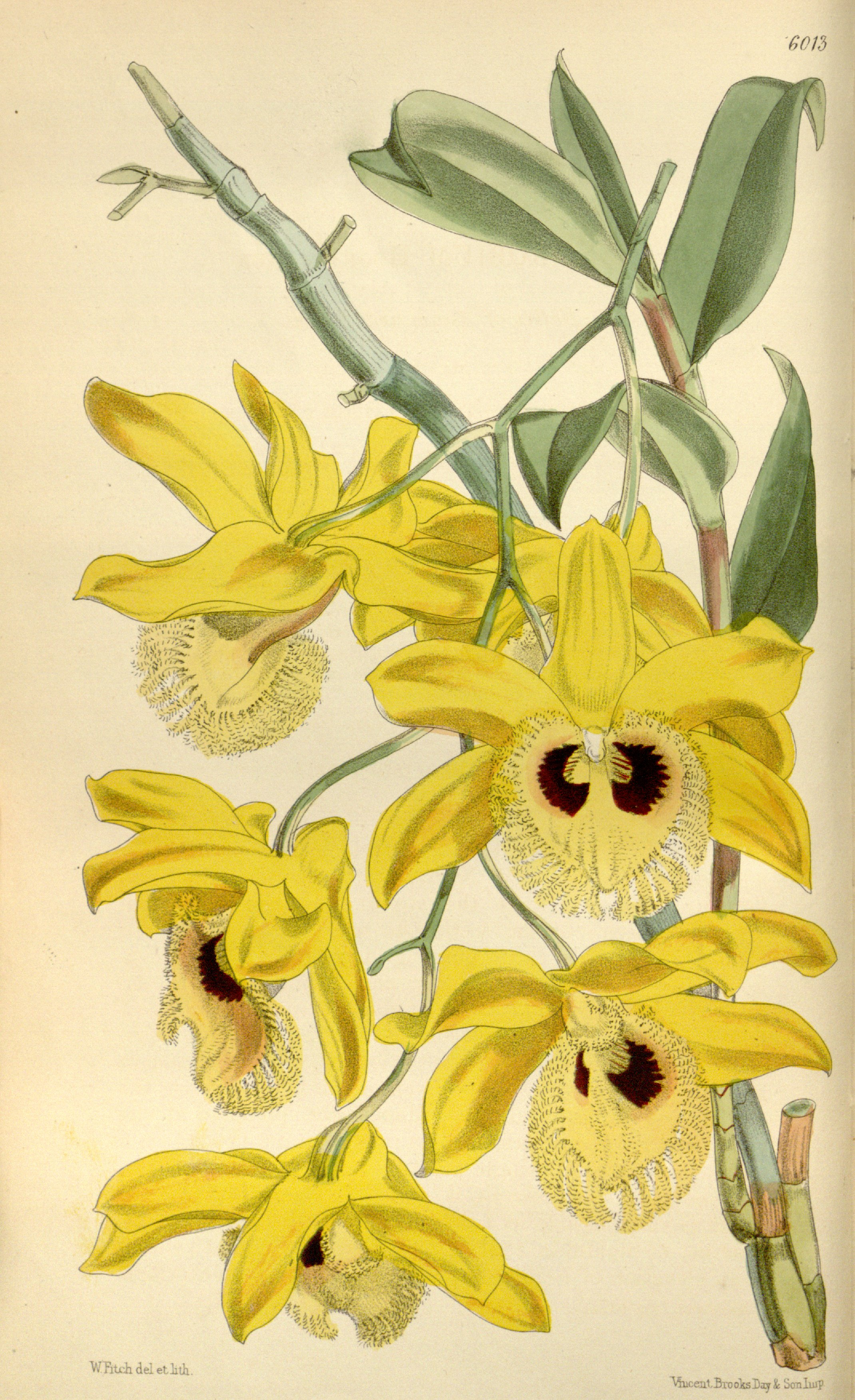
Dendrobium hookerianum

- Dendrobium habbemense P.Royen
- Dendrobium hainanense Rolfe
- Dendrobium halmaheirense J.J.Sm.
- Dendrobium hamadryas Schltr.
- Dendrobium hamaticalcar J.J.Wood & Dauncey
- Dendrobium hamatum Rolfe
- Dendrobium hamiferum P.J.Cribb
- Dendrobium hampelii Cootes & Boos
- Dendrobium hancockii Rolfe
- Dendrobium hansmeyerense Ormerod
- Dendrobium hartleyi Ormerod
- Dendrobium harveyanum Rchb.f.
- Dendrobium hasseltii (Blume) Lindl.
- Dendrobium hastilabium Kraenzl.
- Dendrobium hawkesii A.H.Heller
- Dendrobium hekouense Z.J.Liu & L.J.Chen
- Dendrobium helix P.J.Cribb
- Dendrobium hellerianum A.D.Hawkes
- Dendrobium hellwigianum Kraenzl. ex Warb.
- Dendrobium hemimelanoglossum Guillamin
- Dendrobium hendersonii A.D.Hawkes & A.H.Heller
- Dendrobium henryi Schltr.
- Dendrobium hentyanum Ormerod
- Dendrobium heokhuii P.O'Byrne & J.J.Wood
- Dendrobium hepaticum J.J.Sm.
- Dendrobium herbaceum Lindl.
- Dendrobium hercoglossum Rchb.f.
- Dendrobium herpetophytum Schltr.
- Dendrobium hesperis (Seidenf.) Schuit. & Peter B.Adams
- Dendrobium heterobulbum Schltr.
- Dendrobium heterocarpum Wall. ex Lindl.
- Dendrobium heteroglossum Schltr.
- Dendrobium heteroideum Blume
- Dendrobium heyneanum Lindl.
- Dendrobium hippocrepiferum Schltr.
- Dendrobium hirsutifolium J.J.Wood
- Dendrobium hirtulum Rolfe
- Dendrobium hispidum A.Rich.
- Dendrobium hkinhumense Ormerod & C.S.Kumar
- Dendrobium hocklengii P.T.Ong
- Dendrobium hodgkinsonii Rolfe
- Dendrobium hoftii Ormerod
- Dendrobium hollandianum J.J.Sm.
- Dendrobium holochilum Schltr.
- Dendrobium homoglossum Schltr.
- Dendrobium hooglandianum Ormerod
- Dendrobium hookerianum Lindl.
- Dendrobium hooveri Ormerod
- Dendrobium hornei S.Moore
- Dendrobium horstii J.J.Sm.
- Dendrobium hosei Ridl.
- Dendrobium hughii Rchb.f.
- Dendrobium humicolle Schltr.
- Dendrobium huoshanense Z.Z.Tang & S.J.Cheng
- Dendrobium hydrophilum J.J.Sm.
  - Dendrobium hydrophilum var. hydrophilum
  - Dendrobium hydrophilum var. morotaiense J.J.Sm.
- Dendrobium hymenanthum Rchb.f.
- Dendrobium hymenocentrum Schltr.
- Dendrobium hymenopetalum Schltr.
- Dendrobium hymenophyllum Lindl.
- Dendrobium hymenopterum Hook.f.
- Dendrobium hyperanthiflorum Kraenzl.
- Dendrobium hypopogon Kraenzl.

== I ==
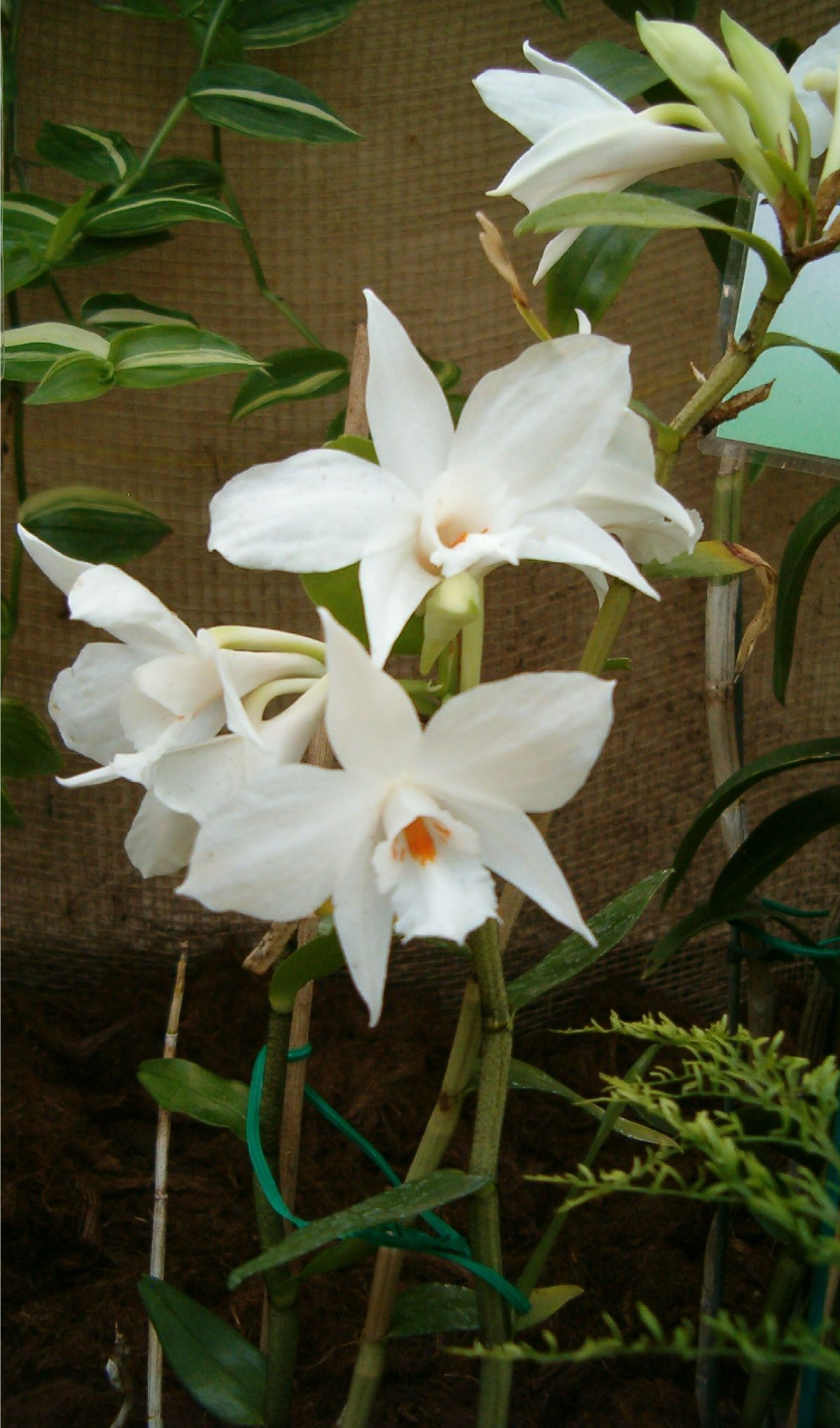
Dendrobium infundibulum

- Dendrobium ianthinum Schuit. & Puspit.
- Dendrobium iboense Schltr.
- Dendrobium igneoniveum J.J.Sm.
- Dendrobium igneum J.J.Sm.
- Dendrobium imbricatum J.J.Sm.
- Dendrobium imitans Schltr.
- Dendrobium imitator J.J.Wood
- Dendrobium implicatum Fukuy.
- Dendrobium inamoenum Kraenzl.
- Dendrobium inauditum Rchb.f.
- Dendrobium inconspicuum J.J.Sm.
- Dendrobium inconstans J.J.Sm.
- Dendrobium incumbens Schltr.
- Dendrobium incurvatum Schltr.
- Dendrobium incurvociliatum J.J.Sm.
- Dendrobium incurvum Lindl.
- Dendrobium indivisum (Blume) Miq.
  - Dendrobium indivisum var. fuscum P.O'Byrne
  - Dendrobium indivisum var. indivisum
  - Dendrobium indivisum var. lampangense Rolfe
  - Dendrobium indivisum var. pallidum Seidenf.
- Dendrobium indragiriense Schltr.
- Dendrobium inflatum Rolfe
- Dendrobium informe J.J.Sm.
- Dendrobium infractum J.J.Sm.
- Dendrobium infundibulum Lindl.
- Dendrobium ingratum J.J.Sm.
- Dendrobium insigne (Blume) Rchb.f. ex Miq. – tartan mangrove orchid
  - Dendrobium insigne var. insigne
  - Dendrobium insigne var. subsimplex J.J.Sm.
- Dendrobium integrilabium J.J.Sm.
- Dendrobium integrum Schltr.
  - Dendrobium integrum subsp. integrum
  - Dendrobium integrum subsp. merianum Ormerod
- Dendrobium interjectum Ames
- Dendrobium interruptum J.J.Sm.
- Dendrobium intricatum Gagnep.
- Dendrobium inversum J.Bradshaw ex Cortauld
- Dendrobium invitum P.O'Byrne & J.J.Verm.
- Dendrobium involutum Lindl.
- Dendrobium ionopus Rchb.f.
- Dendrobium irinae Ormerod
- Dendrobium isabelense Ormerod
- Dendrobium ischnopetalum Schltr.
- Dendrobium ischnophyton Schltr.
- Dendrobium isochiloides Kraenzl.
  - Dendrobium isochiloides var. isochiloides
  - Dendrobium isochiloides var. pumilum J.J.Sm.
- Dendrobium isthmiferum J.J.Sm.
- Dendrobium iteratum J.J.Sm.

== J ==
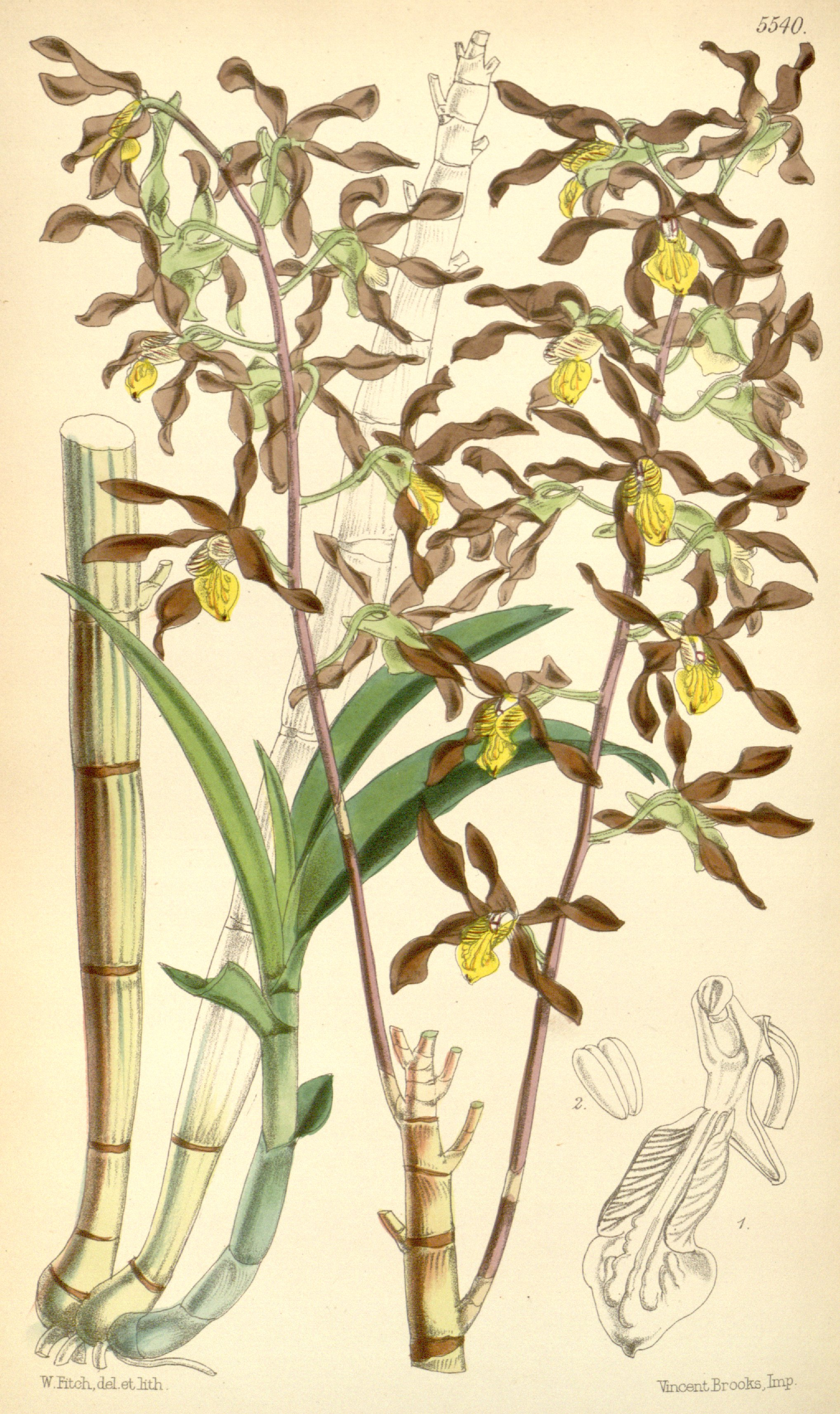
Dendrobium johannis

- Dendrobium jabiense J.J.Sm.
- Dendrobium jacobsonii J.J.Sm.
- Dendrobium jadunae Schltr.
- Dendrobium jamirusii J.J.Wood & A.L.Lamb
- Dendrobium jenkinsii Wall. ex Lindl.
- Dendrobium jennae P.O'Byrne
- Dendrobium jennyanum Kraenzl.
- Dendrobium jerdonianum Wight
- Dendrobium jiajiangense Z.Y.Zhu, S.J.Zhu & H.B.Wang
- Dendrobium jimcootesii Cabactulan & M.Leon
- Dendrobium jinghuanum B.Q.Zheng & Yan Wang
- Dendrobium johannis Rchb.f. – chocolate tea tree orchid
- Dendrobium johnsoniae F.Muell.
- Dendrobium jonesii Rendle – oak orchid
  - Dendrobium jonesii var. jonesii
  - Dendrobium jonesii var. magnificum (Dockrill) Dockrill – large oak orchid
- Dendrobium josephinae Cootes
- Dendrobium jubatum Schuit. & de Vogel
- Dendrobium judithiae P.O'Byrne
- Dendrobium junceum Lindl.
- Dendrobium juncifolium Schltr.
- Dendrobium juncoideum P.Royen
- Dendrobium junctilobum (Fessel & Lückel) Schuit. & Peter B.Adams
- Dendrobium juniperinum Schltr.
- Dendrobium jyrdii Cabactulan, Cootes, M.Leon & Pimentel

== K ==
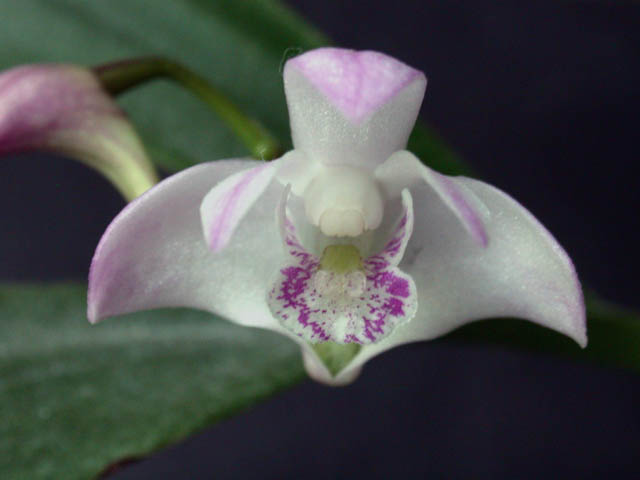
Dendrobium kingianum

- Dendrobium kabanense Cavestro
- Dendrobium kallarense J.Mathew, K.V.George, Yohannan & K.Madhus.
- Dendrobium kanakorum Kraenzl.
- Dendrobium kanburiense Seidenf.
- Dendrobium kanchianum Ormerod
- Dendrobium kaniense Schltr.
- Dendrobium karoense Schltr.
- Dendrobium katherinae A.D.Hawkes
- Dendrobium kauldorumii T.M.Reeve
- Dendrobium keithii Ridl.
- Dendrobium kelamense Metusala, P.O'Byrne & J.J.Wood
- Dendrobium kempfianum Ormerod
- Dendrobium kempterianum Schltr.
- Dendrobium kenepaiense J.J.Sm.
- Dendrobium kentrochilum Hook.f.
- Dendrobium kentrophyllum Hook.f.
- Dendrobium kerstingianum Schltr.
- Dendrobium ketrickkianum P.O'Byrne, Gokusing & A.L.Lamb
- Dendrobium keytsianum J.J.Sm.
- Dendrobium khanhoaense Aver.
- Dendrobium khasianum Deori
- Dendrobium kiamfeeanum P.O'Byrne & J.J.Verm.
- Dendrobium kiauense Ames & C.Schweinf.
- Dendrobium kietaense Schltr.
- Dendrobium kinabuluense Ridl.
- Dendrobium kingianum Bidwill ex Lindl. – pink rock orchid
  - Dendrobium kingianum ssp. carnarvonense Peter B.Adams
  - Dendrobium kingianum ssp. kingianum
  - Dendrobium kingianum var. pulcherrimum Rupp
- Dendrobium kirchianum A.D.Hawkes & A.H.Heller
- Dendrobium kjellbergii J.J.Sm.
- Dendrobium klabatense Schltr.
- Dendrobium klossii Ridl.
- Dendrobium kontumense Gagnep.
- Dendrobium koordersii J.J.Sm.
- Dendrobium korthalsii J.J.Sm.
- Dendrobium kotanicanum Ormerod
- Dendrobium koyamae Nob.Tanaka, T.Yukawa & J.Murata
- Dendrobium kraemeri Schltr.
- Dendrobium kraenzlinii L.O.Williams
- Dendrobium kratense Kerr
- Dendrobium kruiense J.J.Sm.
- Dendrobium kruizingae de Vogel, E.Winkel & Vugt
- Dendrobium kurashigei T.Yukawa
- Dendrobium kuyperi J.J.Sm.

== L ==
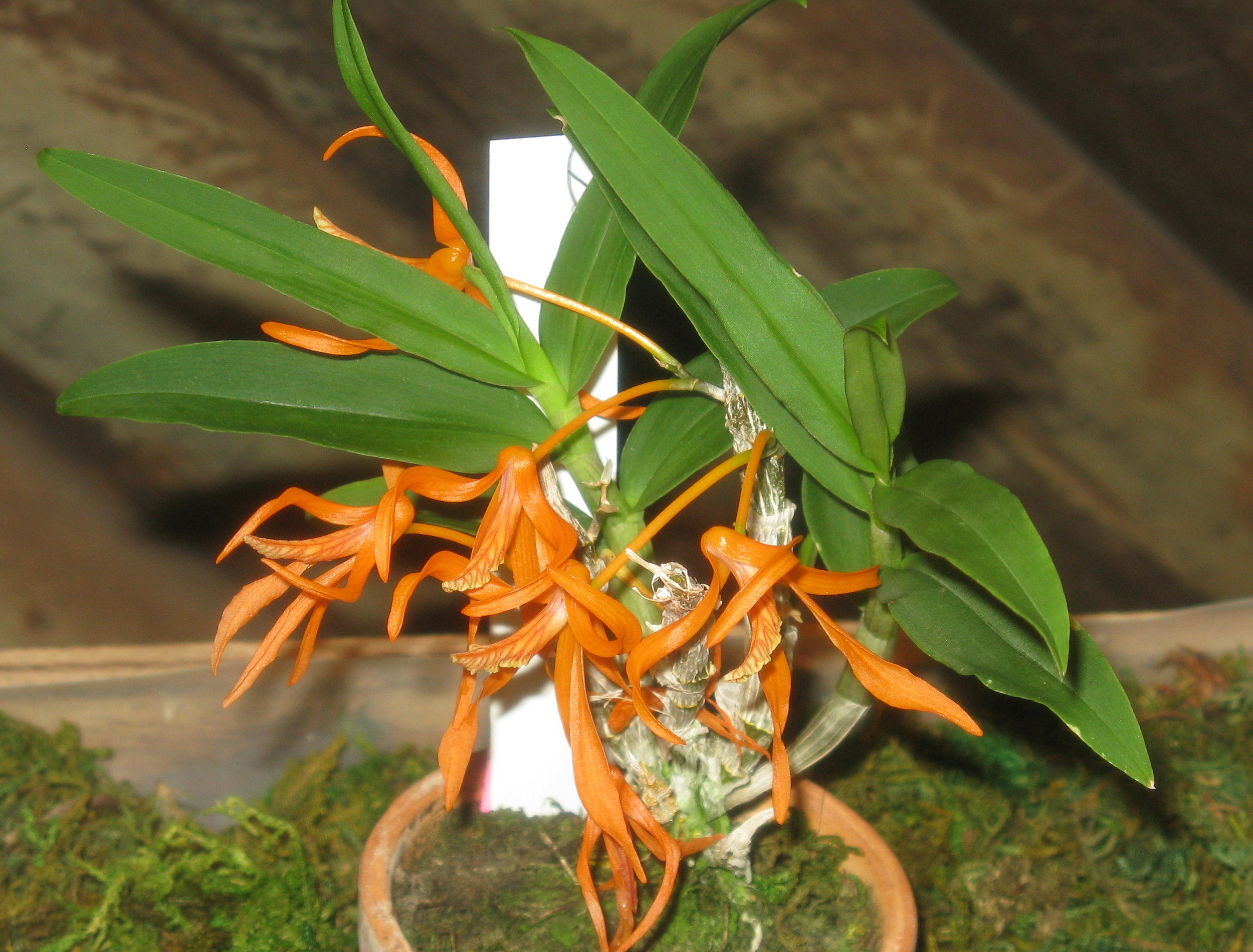
Dendrobium lamyaiae

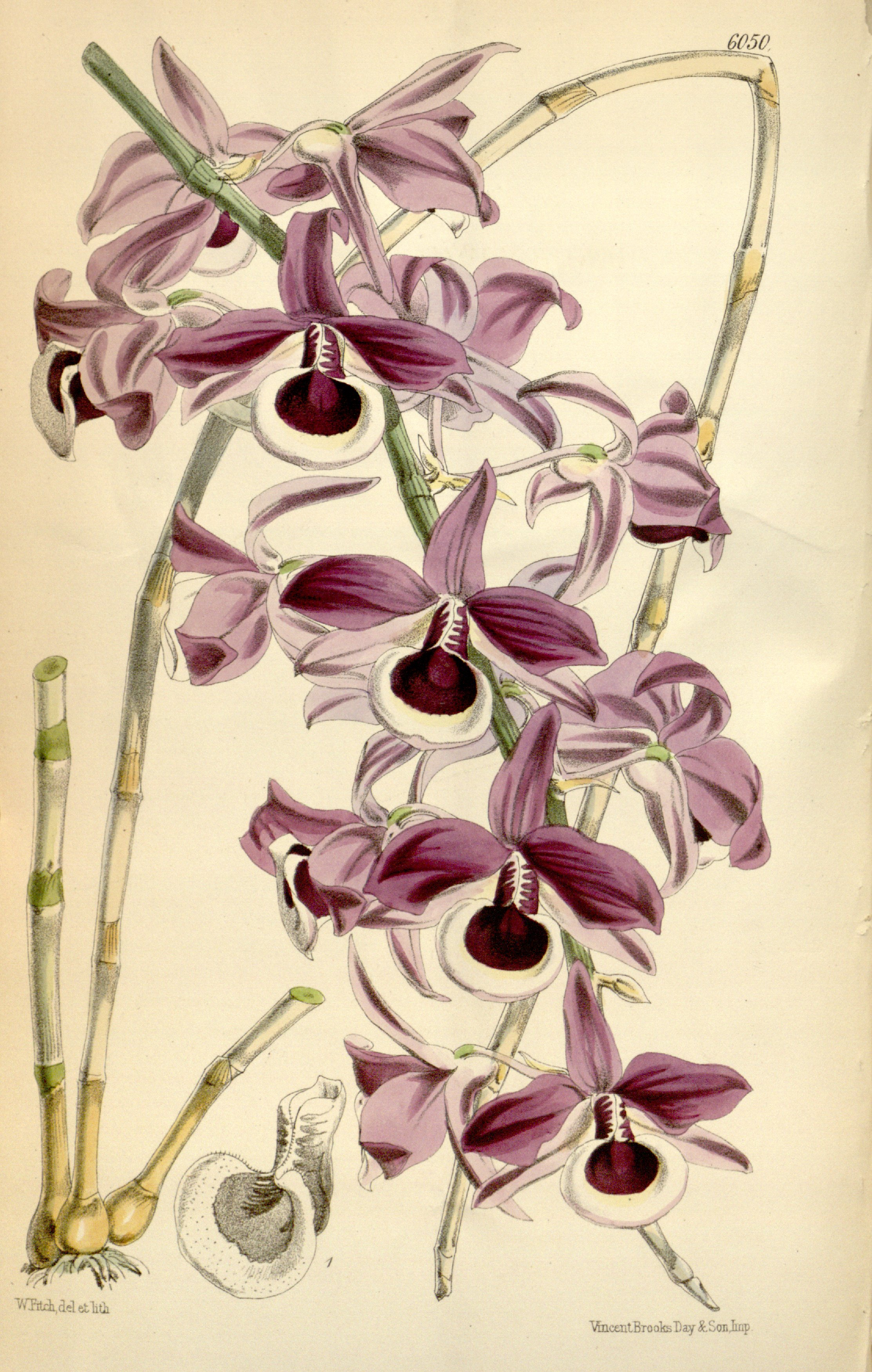
Dendrobium lituiflorum

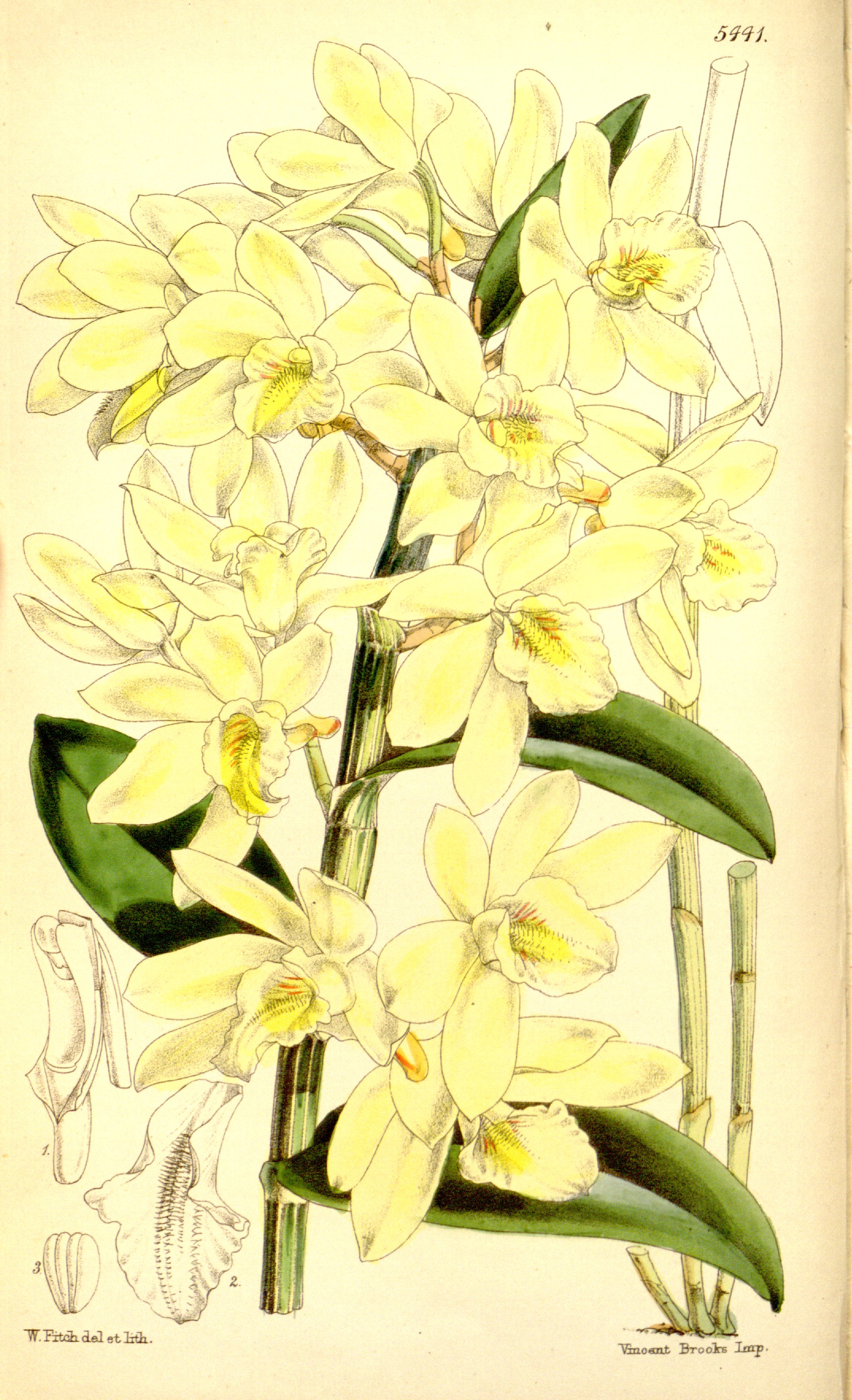
Dendrobium luteolum

- Dendrobium labangense J.J.Sm.
- Dendrobium labuanum Lindl.
- Dendrobium laceratum Schltr.
- Dendrobium laciniosum Ridl.
- Dendrobium lacteum Kraenzl.
- Dendrobium laevifolium Stapf
- Dendrobium lagarum Seidenf.
- Dendrobium lageniforme J.J.Sm.
- Dendrobium lagorum P.Royen
- Dendrobium lambii J.J.Wood
- Dendrobium lamellatum (Blume) Lindl.
- Dendrobium lamelluliferum J.J.Sm.
- Dendrobium lamii J.J.Sm.
- Dendrobium lampongense J.J.Sm.
- Dendrobium lamprocaulon Schltr.
- Dendrobium lamproglossum Schltr.
- Dendrobium lamrianum C.L.Chan
- Dendrobium lamyaiae Seidenf.
- Dendrobium lancifolium A.Rich.
- Dendrobium lancilabium J.J.Sm.
- Dendrobium lancilobum J.J.Wood
  - Dendrobium lancilobum var. lancilobum
  - Dendrobium lancilobum var. roseocalcar (J.J.Wood & A.L.Lamb) J.J.Wood
- Dendrobium langbianense Gagnep.
- Dendrobium lankaviense Ridl.
- Dendrobium lanuginosum Ormerod
- Dendrobium lasianthera J.J.Sm.
- Dendrobium lasioglossum Rchb.f.
- Dendrobium latelabellatum Gilli
- Dendrobium laterale L.O.Williams
- Dendrobium laterale L.O.Williams
- Dendrobium latipetalum (J.J.Sm.) Schuit.
- Dendrobium latoureoides (Schltr.) J.J.Sm.
- Dendrobium laudereavorum M.Pignal
- Dendrobium laurensii J.J.Sm.
- Dendrobium laurifolium (Kraenzl.) J.J.Sm.
- Dendrobium lawesii F.Muell.
- Dendrobium lawianum Lindl.
- Dendrobium lawiense J.J.Sm.
- Dendrobium laxiflorum J.J.Sm.
- Dendrobium ledifolium J.J.Sm.
- Dendrobium × leeanum O'Brien
- Dendrobium legareiense J.J.Sm.
- Dendrobium leonis (Lindl.) Rchb.f.
- Dendrobium lepidochilum Kraenzl.
- Dendrobium leporinum J.J.Sm.
- Dendrobium leptocladum Hayata
- Dendrobium leptophyton Schuit. & de Vogel
- Dendrobium letocartiorum Munzinger & M.Pignal
- Dendrobium leucochlorum Rchb.f.
- Dendrobium leucocyanum T.M.Reeve
- Dendrobium leucohybos Schltr.
- Dendrobium levatii Kraenzl.
- Dendrobium lewisiae Schuit. & de Vogel
- Dendrobium libingtaoi Q.Xu & Z.J.Liu
- Dendrobium lichenastrum (F.Muell.) Rolfe – common button orchid
- Dendrobium limii J.J.Wood
- Dendrobium limpidum Schuit. & de Vogel
  - Dendrobium limpidum subsp. daunceyae Ormerod
  - Dendrobium limpidum subsp. limpidum
- Dendrobium linawianum Rchb.f.
- Dendrobium lindleyi Steud.
- Dendrobium lineale Rolfe
- Dendrobium linearifolium Teijsm. & Binn.
- Dendrobium linguella Rchb.f.
- Dendrobium linguiforme Sw. – thumbnail orchid, tick orchid or tongue orchid
  - Dendrobium linguiforme var. huntianum Rupp
  - Dendrobium linguiforme var. linguiforme
- Dendrobium lituiflorum Lindl.
- Dendrobium lobatum (Blume) Miq.
- Dendrobium lobbii Teijsm. & Binn. – straggly rush orchid
- Dendrobium lobulatum Rolfe ex J.J.Sm.
- Dendrobium loddigesii Rolfe
- Dendrobium loesenerianum Schltr.
- Dendrobium lohanense J.J.Wood
- Dendrobium loherianum Kraenzl.
- Dendrobium lohohense Tang & F.T.Wang
- Dendrobium lohokii J.J.Wood & A.L.Lamb
- Dendrobium lomatochilum Seidenf.
- Dendrobium lonchigerum Schltr.
- Dendrobium longicaule J.J.Sm.
- Dendrobium longicolle Lindl.
- Dendrobium longicornu Lindl.
- Dendrobium longipedicellatum de Vogel
- Dendrobium longipes Hook.f.
- Dendrobium longiramense J.J.Wood & P.O'Byrne
- Dendrobium longirepens Ames & C.Schweinf.
- Dendrobium longissimum Schltr.
- Dendrobium lowii Lindl.
- Dendrobium lucens Rchb.f.
- Dendrobium lueckelianum Fessel & M.Wolff
- Dendrobium lumakuense J.J.Wood
- Dendrobium lunatum Lindl.
- Dendrobium luoi L.J.Chen & W.H.Rao
- Dendrobium luteochilum Rupp
- Dendrobium luteolum Bateman
- Dendrobium luxurians J.J.Sm.
- Dendrobium luzonense Lindl.
- Dendrobium lydiae Cootes, M.Leon & Naive

== M ==
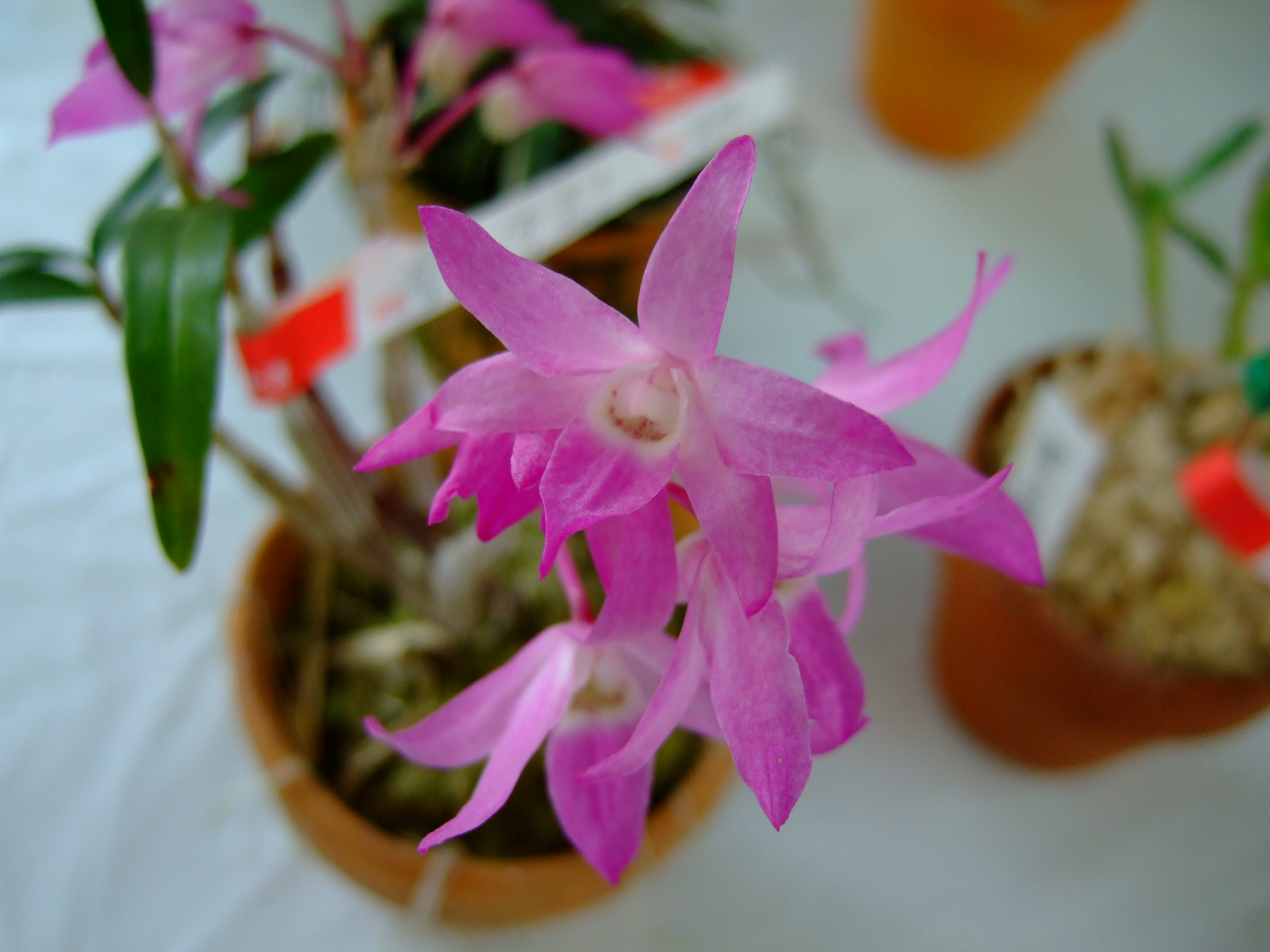
Dendrobium moniliforme

- Dendrobium maccarthiae Thwaites
- Dendrobium macfarlanei F.Muell.
- Dendrobium macraei Lindl.
- Dendrobium macranthum A.Rich.
- Dendrobium macraporum J.J.Sm.
- Dendrobium macrifolium J.J.Sm.
- Dendrobium macrogenion Schltr.
- Dendrobium macrolobum J.J.Sm.
- Dendrobium macrophyllum A.Rich.
  - Dendrobium macrophyllum var. macrophyllum
  - Dendrobium macrophyllum var. subvelutinum J.J.Sm.
  - Dendrobium macrophyllum var. ternatense (J.J.Sm.) P.O'Byrne & J.J.Wood
- Dendrobium macropodum Hook.f.
- Dendrobium macropus (Endl.) Rchb.f. ex Lindl. – Norfolk Island cane orchid
- Dendrobium macrostachyum Lindl. – fringed tree orchid
- Dendrobium macrostigma J.J.Sm.
- Dendrobium macrum Schltr.
- Dendrobium maculosum J.J.Sm.
- Dendrobium magistratus P.J.Cribb
- Dendrobium magnilabre (P.J.Cribb & B.A.Lewis) Schuit. & Peter B.Adams
- Dendrobium maidenianum Schltr. – coastal burr orchid
- Dendrobium maierae J.J.Sm.
- Dendrobium malacanthum Kraenzl.
- Dendrobium malbrownii Dockrill – McIlwraith hermit orchid
- Dendrobium maliliense J.J.Sm.
- Dendrobium malvicolor Ridl.
- Dendrobium mamasaense P.O'Byrne & J.J.Verm.
- Dendrobium mamberamense J.J.Sm.
- Dendrobium mambo Ormerod
- Dendrobium mannii Ridl.
- Dendrobium maraiparense J.J.Wood & C.L.Chan
- Dendrobium margaretiae T.M.Reeve
- Dendrobium marmoratum Rchb.f.
- Dendrobium masarangense Schltr.
  - Dendrobium masarangense var. chlorinum (Ridl.) T.M.Reeve & P.Woods
  - Dendrobium masarangense subsp. masarangense
  - Dendrobium masarangense subsp. theionanthum (Schltr.) T.M.Reeve & P.Woods
- Dendrobium matapense Oremerod
- Dendrobium mayandyi T.M.Reeve & Renz
- Dendrobium megaceras Hook.f.
- Dendrobium meiernianum P.O'Byrne, P.T.Ong & J.J.Wood
- Dendrobium mekynosepalum Schltr.
- Dendrobium melanostictum Schltr.
- Dendrobium melanotrichum Schltr.
- Dendrobium melinanthum Schltr.
- Dendrobium meliodorum Schltr.
- Dendrobium mellicolor J.J.Sm.
- Dendrobium merrillii Ames
- Dendrobium metachilinum Rchb.f.
- Dendrobium metrium Kraenzl.
- Dendrobium microbulbon A.Rich.
- Dendrobium microglaphys Rchb.f.
- Dendrobium micronephelium J.J.Sm.
- Dendrobium microphoton L.O.Williams
- Dendrobium milaniae Fessel & Lückel
- Dendrobium militare P.J.Cribb
- Dendrobium millarae A.D.Hawkes
- Dendrobium mimicum (Ormerod) Schuit. & Peter B.Adams
- Dendrobium mindanaense Ames
- Dendrobium minimiflorum Gilli
- Dendrobium minimum Ames & C.Schweinf.
- Dendrobium minusculum Aver.
- Dendrobium mirandum Schltr.
- Dendrobium mirbelianum Gaudich. – dark-stemmed antler orchid, mangrove orchid
- Dendrobium mischobulbum Schltr.
- Dendrobium miserum Rchb.f.
- Dendrobium misoanum Oremerod
- Dendrobium miyasakii Ames & Quisumb.
- Dendrobium mizanii Rusea & Besi
- Dendrobium modestum Rchb.f.
- Dendrobium mohlianum Rchb.f.
  - Dendrobium mohlianum subsp. kolombangaricum Ormerod
  - Dendrobium mohlianum subsp. mohlianum
- Dendrobium moiorum Saputra, Schuit., Wanma & Naive
- Dendrobium moirianum A.D.Hawkes
- Dendrobium molle J.J.Sm.
- Dendrobium moniliforme (L.) Sw.
- Dendrobium monophyllum F.Muell. – lily-of-the-valley orchid
- Dendrobium montanum J.J.Sm.
- Dendrobium montedeakinense F.M.Bailey
- Dendrobium monticola P.F.Hunt & Summerh.
- Dendrobium montis-hosei J.J.Wood
- Dendrobium montis-sellae Kraenzl.
- Dendrobium montis-yulei Kraenzl.
- Dendrobium mooreanum Lindl.
- Dendrobium moorei F.Muell. – drooping cane orchid
- Dendrobium moquetteanum J.J.Sm.
- Dendrobium morio P.O'Byrne, J.J.Verm. & P.K.F.Leong
- Dendrobium morotaiense J.J.Sm.
- Dendrobium morrisonii Schltr.
- Dendrobium mortii F.Muell. – slender pencil orchid
- Dendrobium moschatum (Banks) Sw.
- Dendrobium mucronatum Seidenf.
- Dendrobium mucrovaginatum Metusala & J.J.Wood
- Dendrobium mulderi Schuit. & de Vogel
- Dendrobium multifolium Schltr.
- Dendrobium multilineatum Kerr
- Dendrobium multiramosum Ames
- Dendrobium multistriatum J.J.Sm.
- Dendrobium muluense J.J.Wood
- Dendrobium munificum (Finet) Schltr.
- Dendrobium muricatum Finet
- Dendrobium muriciferum (J.J.Sm.) Oremerod
- Dendrobium mussauense Oremerod
- Dendrobium mutabile (Blume) Lindl.

== N ==
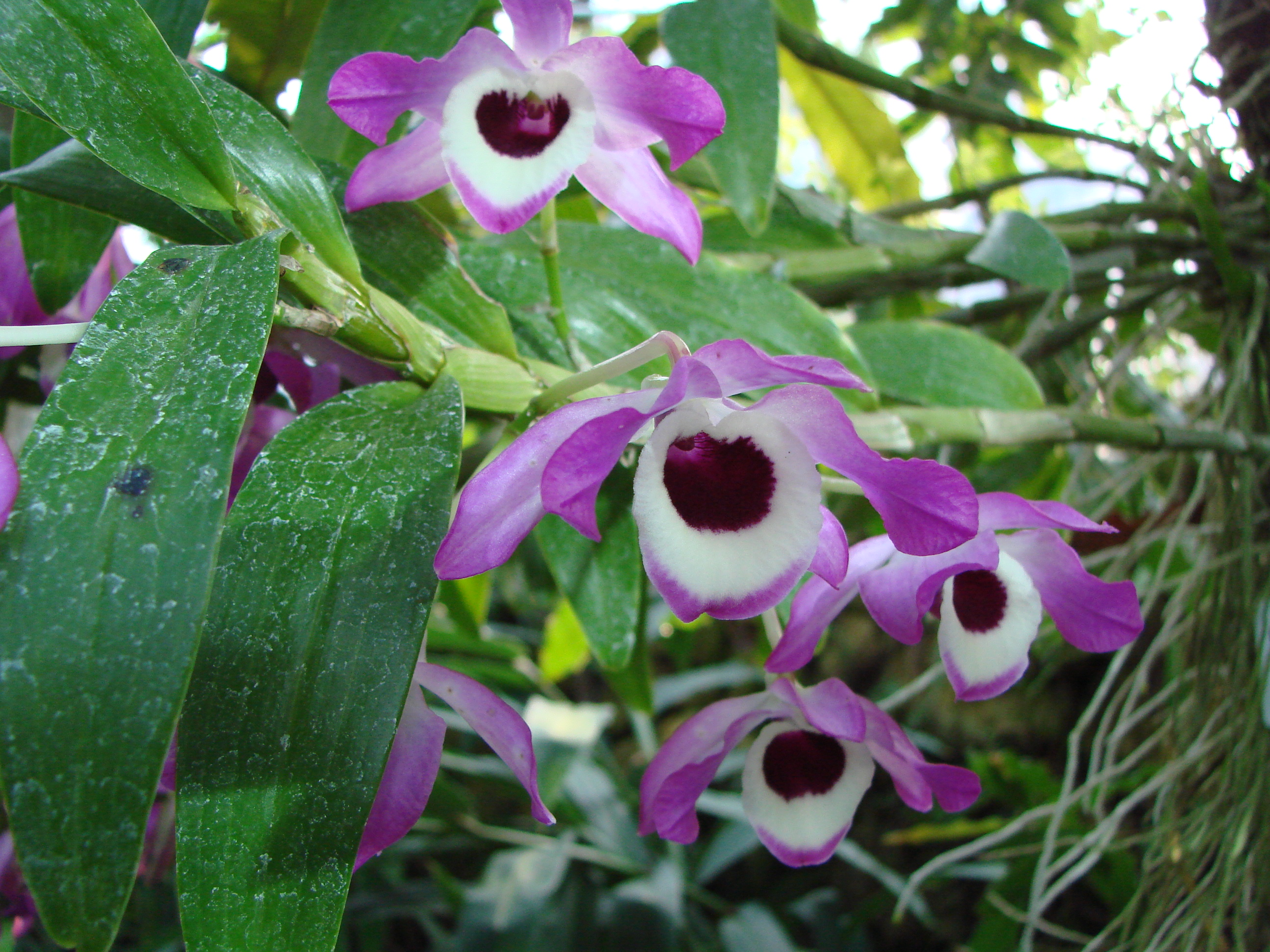
Dendrobium nobile

- Dendrobium nabawanense J.J.Wood & A.L.Lamb
- Dendrobium nagataksaka Metusala
- Dendrobium nakaharae Schltr.
- Dendrobium nangajuense C.Y.Ling & P.O'Byrne
- Dendrobium nanocompactum Seidenf.
- Dendrobium nanum Hook.f.
- Dendrobium naqii Cavestro
- Dendrobium nardoides Schltr.
- Dendrobium nareshbahadurii H.B.Naithani
- Dendrobium nathanielis Rchb.f.
- Dendrobium nativitatis Ridl. – Christmas Island crimp orchid
- Dendrobium naungmungense Q.Liu & X.H.Jin
- Dendrobium navicula Kraenzl.
- Dendrobium nazaretii (P.O'Byrne & J.J.Verm.) Schuit. & Peter B.Adams
- Dendrobium nebularum Schltr.
- Dendrobium neglectum Gagnep.
- Dendrobium nemorale L.O.Williams
- Dendrobium neoguineense A.D.Hawkes & A.H.Heller
- Dendrobium neospectabile J.M.H.Shaw – Eungella king orchid
- Dendrobium nephrolepidis Schltr.
- Dendrobium neuroglossun Schltr.
- Dendrobium ngoyense Schltr.
- Dendrobium nieuwenhuisii J.J.Sm.
- Dendrobium nigricans Schltr.
- Dendrobium nimium J.J.Sm.
- Dendrobium nindii W.Hill – blue antler orchid
- Dendrobium nitidicolle W.Hill
- Dendrobium nitidissimum Rchb.f.
- Dendrobium niueense Ormerod
- Dendrobium niveobarbatum Cootes
- Dendrobium niveolabium Handoyo, Naive, Ormerod & J.Champ.
- Dendrobium niveopurpureum J.J.Sm.
- Dendrobium njongense Schltr.
- Dendrobium nobile Lindl.
- Dendrobium nodosum Dalzell
- Dendrobium noesae J.J.Sm.
- Dendrobium normanbyense P.J.spence
- Dendrobium nothofageti (M.A.Clem & D.L.Jones) Schuit. & de Vogel
- Dendrobium nothofagicola T.M.Reeve
- Dendrobium novobritannicum de Vogel
- Dendrobium nubigenum Schltr.
- Dendrobium nudum (Blume) Lindl.
- Dendrobium numaldeorii C.Deori, Hynn. & Phukan
- Dendrobium nummularia Schltr.
- Dendrobium nutantiflorum A.D.Hawkes & A.H.Heller
- Dendrobium nycteridoglossum Rchb.f.

== O ==
- Dendrobium obchantiae Promm., Suddee & Kidyoo
- Dendrobium obcordatum J.J.Sm.
- Dendrobium obcuneatum F.M.Bailey
- Dendrobium obliquum Schltr.
- Dendrobium oblongimentum Hosok. & Fukuy.
- Dendrobium obovatum Schltr.
- Dendrobium obreniforme Schuit. & Peter B.Adams
- Dendrobium obrienianum Kraenzl.
- Dendrobium obscure-auriculatum Gilli
- Dendrobium obtusum Schltr.
- Dendrobium obyrnei (W.K.Harris) Schuit. & de Vogel
- Dendrobium ochraceum De Wild.
- Dendrobium ochranthum Schltr.
- Dendrobium ochreatum Lindl.
- Dendrobium ochroleucum Teijsm. & Binn.
- Dendrobium ochthochilum P.O'Byrne & J.J.Verm.
- Dendrobium odoardii Kraenzl.
- Dendrobium odontopus Schltr.
- Dendrobium odoratum Schltr.
- Dendrobium officinale Kimura & Migo
- Dendrobium okabeanum Tuyama
- Dendrobium okinawense Hatus. & Ida
- Dendrobium oliganthum Schltr.
- Dendrobium oligophyllum Gagnep.
- Dendrobium olivaceum J.J.Sm.
- Dendrobium omissum Schuit. & Peter B.Adams
- Dendrobium opilionites Schltr.
- Dendrobium oppositifolium (Kraenzl.) N.Hallé
- Dendrobium optimuspatruus P.O'Byrne & J.J.Verm.
- Dendrobium orbilobulatum Fessel & Lückel
- Dendrobium oreodoxa Schltr.
- Dendrobium orientale J.J.Sm.
- Dendrobium ormerodii Hanhoyo, Naive & J.Champ.
- Dendrobium ornatum Ormerod & Juswara
- Dendrobium ornithoflorum Ames
- Dendrobium osmophytopsis Kraenzl.
- Dendrobium ostrinum J.J.Sm.
  - Dendrobium ostrinum var. ochroleucum J.J.Sm.
  - Dendrobium ostrinum var. ostrinum
- Dendrobium otaguroanum A.D.Hawkes
- Dendrobium ou-hinnae Schltr.
- Dendrobium ovatifolium Ridl.
- Dendrobium ovatipetalum J.J.Sm.
- Dendrobium ovatum (L.) Kraenzl.
- Dendrobium ovipostoriferum J.J.Sm.
- Dendrobium oxychilum Schltr.

== P ==
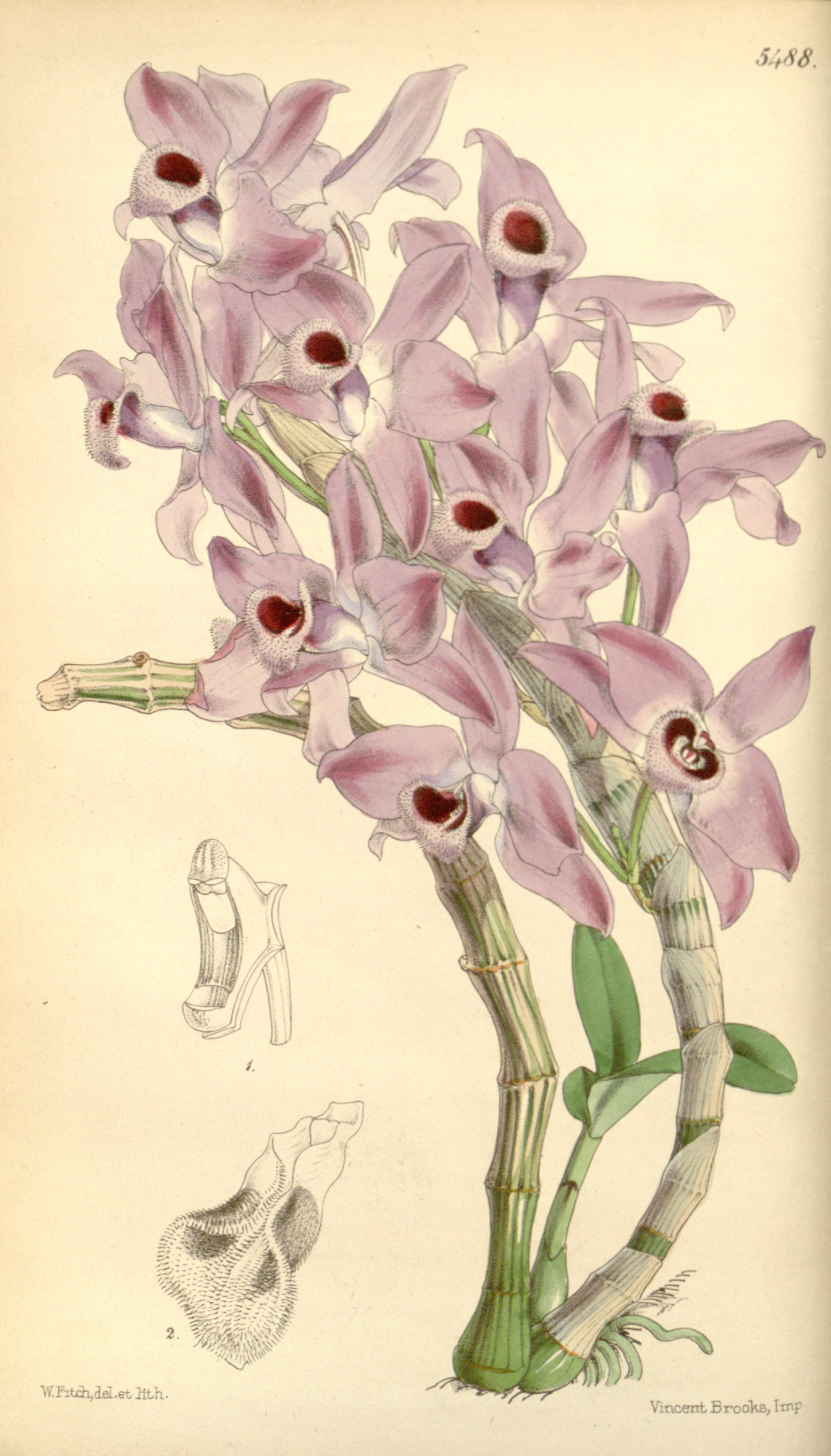
Parish's Dendrobium, Dendrobium parishii

- Dendrobium paathii J.J.Sm.
- Dendrobium pachyanthum Schltr.
- Dendrobium pachyglossum C.S.P.Parish & Rchb.f.
- Dendrobium pachyphyllum (Kuntze) Bakh.f.
- Dendrobium pachystele Schltr.
- Dendrobium pachythrix T.M.Reeve & P.Woods
- Dendrobium pacificum M.A.Clem. & P.J.Spence
- Dendrobium padangense Schltr.
- Dendrobium × pahangense Carr
- Dendrobium paitanense J.J.Wood
- Dendrobium palawense Schltr.
- Dendrobium palmerianum Ormerod
- Dendrobium palpebrae Lindl.
- Dendrobium panduratum Lindl.
  - Dendrobium panduratum ssp. panduratum
  - Dendrobium panduratum ssp. villosum Gopalan & A.N.Henry
- Dendrobium panduriferum Hook.f.
- Dendrobium pangunaense (Ormerod) Schuit. & Peter B.Adams
- Dendrobium pantherinum Schltr.
- Dendrobium papilio Loher
- Dendrobium papilionaceum (Cootes & M.A.Clem.) Naive & Alejandro
- Dendrobium papilioniferum J.J.Sm.
- Dendrobium papillilabium J.J.Sm.
- Dendrobium papuanum J.J.Sm.
- Dendrobium papyraceum J.J.Sm.
- Dendrobium paradoxum Teijsm. & Binn.
- Dendrobium paragnomus Ormerod
- Dendrobium parahendersonii Vuong, Aver. & V.C.Nguyen
- Dendrobium parciflorum Rchb.f. ex Lindl.
- Dendrobium parcum Rchb.f.
- Dendrobium pardalinum Rchb.f.
- Dendrobium parietiforme J.J.Sm.
- Dendrobium parishii H.Low
- Dendrobium parnatanum Cavestro
- Dendrobium parthenium Rchb.f.
- Dendrobium particolor Ormerod
- Dendrobium parvibulbum de Vogel
- Dendrobium parvifolium J.J.Sm.
- Dendrobium parvilobum Schltr.
- Dendrobium parvulum Rolfe
- Dendrobium paspalifolium J.J.Sm.
- Dendrobium patentifiliforme Hosok.
- Dendrobium patentilobum Ames & Schweinf.
- Dendrobium patentissimum J.J.Sm.
- Dendrobium patulum Schltr.
- Dendrobium paucilaciniatum J.J.Sm.
- Dendrobium pectinatum Finet
- Dendrobium peculiare J.J.Sm.
- Dendrobium pedicellatum J.J.Sm.
- Dendrobium pemae Schltr.
- Dendrobium pendulum Roxb.
- Dendrobium pensile Ridl.
- Dendrobium pentanema Schltr.
- Dendrobium pentapterum Schltr.
- Dendrobium percnanthum Rchb.f.
- Dendrobium pergracile Ames
- Dendrobium peripetasma P.O'Byrne & J.J.Verm.
- Dendrobium perlongum Schltr.
- Dendrobium perpaulum Seidenf.
- Dendrobium perplexum Phueakkhlai, Sungkaew & H.A.Pederson
- Dendrobium perulatum Gagnep.
- Dendrobium peterobyrneanum C.Y.Ling & P.K.F.Leong
- Dendrobium petiolatum Schltr.
- Dendrobium petrophilum (Kraenzl.) Garay ex N.Hallé
- Dendrobium phaeanthum Schltr.
- Dendrobium phalangillum J.J.Sm.
- Dendrobium phalangium Schltr.
- Dendrobium philippinense Gower
- Dendrobium phillipsii Ames & Quisumb.
- Dendrobium phragmitoides Schltr.
- Dendrobium phuketense Schuit. & Peter B.Adams
- Dendrobium pictum Lindl.
- Dendrobium piestocaulon Schltr.
  - Dendrobium piestocaulon var. kauloense Schltr.
  - Dendrobium piestocaulon var. piestocaulon
- Dendrobium pililobum J.J.Sm.
- Dendrobium pinifoliumLeslie Andrew Garay
- Dendrobium piranha C.L.Chan & P.J.Cribb
- Dendrobium planibulbe Lindl.
- Dendrobium planicaule Ridl.
- Dendrobium planum J.J.Sm.
- Dendrobium platycaulon Rolfe
- Dendrobium platyclinoides J.J.Sm.
- Dendrobium platygastrium Rchb.f.
- Dendrobium platylobum (Schltr.) J.J.Sm.
- Dendrobium platyphyllum Schltr.
- Dendrobium pleasancium P.O'Byrne & J.J.Verm
- Dendrobium plebeim J.J.Sm.
- Dendrobium pleianthum Schltr.
- Dendrobium pleurodes Schltr.
- Dendrobium pleurothalloides Kraenzl.
- Dendrobium plicatile Lindl.
- Dendrobium plumilobum J.J.Sm.
- Dendrobium podocarpifolium Schltr.
- Dendrobium podochiloides Schltr.
- Dendrobium poerwantii Cavestro
- Dendrobium pogonatherum J.J.Sm.
- Dendrobium pogoniates Rchb.f.
- Dendrobium pohnpeiense Schuit. & Peter B.Adams
- Dendrobium poissonianum Schltr.
- Dendrobium polyanthum Wall. ex Lindl.
- Dendrobium polycladium Rchb.f.
  - Dendrobium polycladium var. atractoglossum N.Hallé
  - Dendrobium polycladium var. polycladium
- Dendrobium polyphyllum Schltr.
- Dendrobium polyrhopalon Ormerod
- Dendrobium polyschistum Schltr.
  - Dendrobium polyschistum var. graminiforme Schltr.
  - Dendrobium polyschistum var. polyschistum
- Dendrobium polysema Schltr.
- Dendrobium polytrichum Ames
- Dendrobium ponapense Schltr.
- Dendrobium poneroides Schltr.
  - Dendrobium poneroides var. angustum Schltr.
  - Dendrobium poneroides var. poneroides
- Dendrobium popaense T.Yukawa & Nob.Tanaka
- Dendrobium porphyrochilum Lindl.
- Dendrobium potamophila Schltr.
- Dendrobium praecinctum Rchb.f.
- Dendrobium praemorsum Schuit. & de Vogel
- Dendrobium praetermissum Seidenf.
- Dendrobium prasinum Lindl.
- Dendrobium prianganense J.J.Wood & J.B.Comber
- Dendrobium × primulardii Horridge
- Dendrobium primulinum Lindl.
- Dendrobium procerum Schltr.
- Dendrobium procumbens Carr
- Dendrobium profusum Rchb.f.
- Dendrobium prostheciglossum Schltr.
- Dendrobium prostratum Ridl.
- Dendrobium proteranthum Seidenf.
- Dendrobium protractum Dauncey
- Dendrobium pruinosum Teijsm. & Binn. – honey orchid
- Dendrobium pseudoaloifolium J.J.Wood
- Dendrobium pseudoaprinum J.J.Sm.
- Dendrobium pseudocalceolum J.J.Sm.
- Dendrobium pseudoclavator J.J.Wood
- Dendrobium pseudoconanthum J.J.Sm.
- Dendrobium pseudoconvexum Ames
- Dendrobium pseudoequitans Fessel & Lückel
- Dendrobium pseudoglomeratum T.M.Reeve & J.J.Wood
- Dendrobium pseudointricatum Guillaumin
- Dendrobium pseudokurashigei J.J.Wood
- Dendrobium pseudolamellatum J.J.Wood & A.L.Lamb
- Dendrobium pseudopeloricum J.J.Sm.
- Dendrobium pseudorarum Dauncey
  - Dendrobium pseudorarum var. baciforme Dauncey
- Dendrobium pseudostriatellum J.J.Wood & P.O'Byrne
- Dendrobium pseudotenellum Guillaumin
- Dendrobium puberulilingue J.J.Sm.
- Dendrobium pugioniforme A.Cunn. ex Lindl. – dagger orchid
- Dendrobium pulchellum Roxb. ex Lindl.
- Dendrobium pulleanum J.J.Sm.
- Dendrobium pullenianum Ormerod
- Dendrobium pulvilliferum Schltr.
- Dendrobium pulvinatum Schltr.
- Dendrobium punamense Schltr.
- Dendrobium punbatuense J.J.Wood
- Dendrobium puncticulosum J.J.Sm.
- Dendrobium puniceum Ridl.
- Dendrobium purpureiflorum J.J.Sm.
- Dendrobium purpureoflavescens Ormerod
- Dendrobium purpureogriseum P.O'Byrne & J.J.Verm.
- Dendrobium purpureostelidium Ames
- Dendrobium purpureum Roxb.
  - Dendrobium purpureum subsp. candidulum (Rchb.f.) Dauncey and P.J.Cribb
  - Dendrobium purpureum ssp. purpureum
- Dendrobium putnamii A.D.Hawkes & A.H.Heller
- Dendrobium pycnostachyum Lindl.

== Q ==
- Dendrobium quadricarinatum de Vogel
- Dendrobium quadriferum Schltr.
- Dendrobium quadrilobatum Carr
- Dendrobium quinquecallosum J.J.Sm.
- Dendrobium quinquecaudatum J.J.Sm.
- Dendrobium quinquedentatum J.J.Sm.
- Dendrobium quinquelobatum Schltr.
- Dendrobium quinquelobum (Schltr.) J.J.Sm.
- Dendrobium quisumbingii A.D.Hawkes & A.H.Heller

== R ==
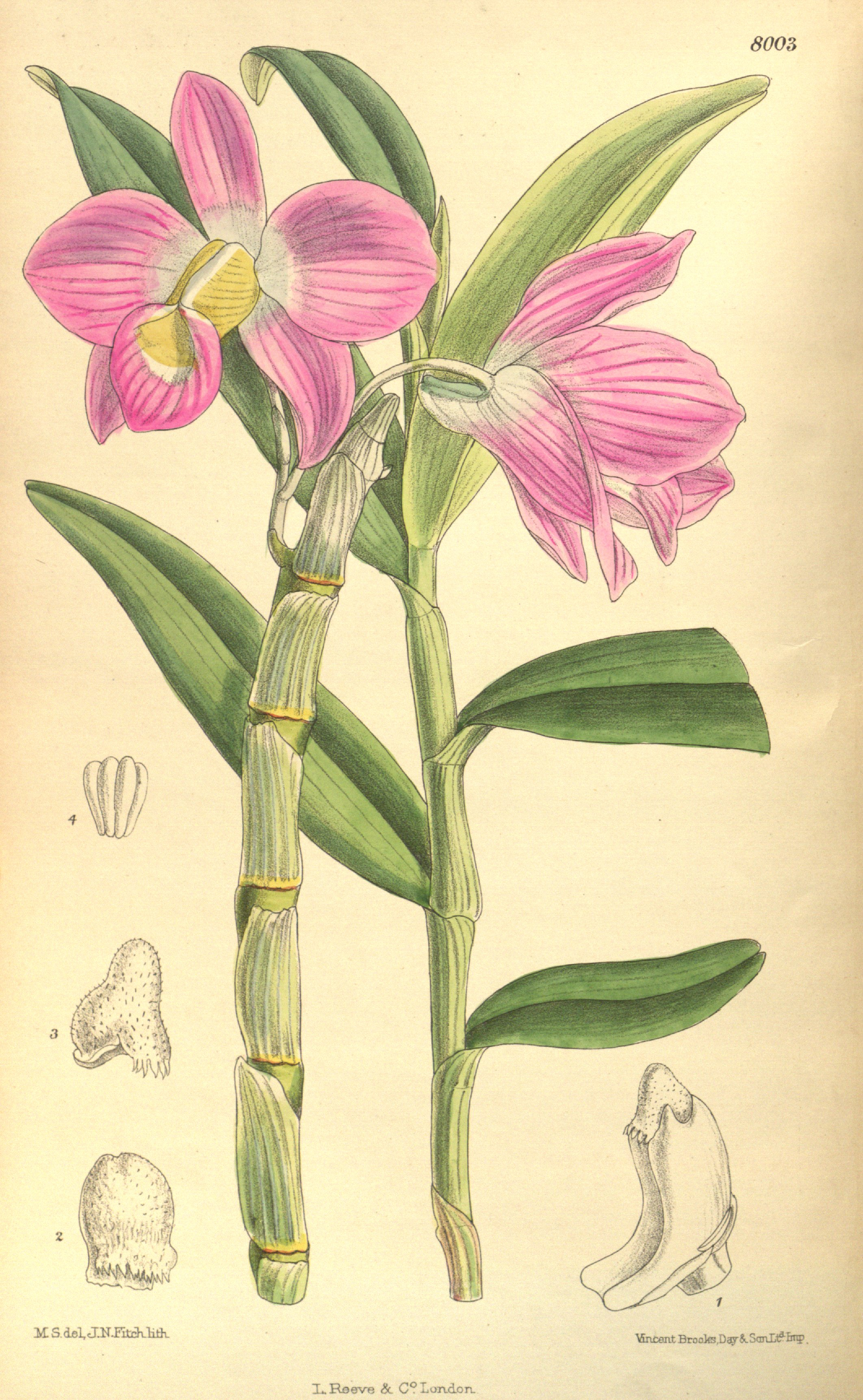
Dendrobium regium

- Dendrobium rabanii Lindl.
- Dendrobium racemosum (Nicholls) Clemesha & Dockrill – erect pencil orchid
- Dendrobium rachmatii J.J.Sm.
- Dendrobium racieanum Cavestro
- Dendrobium radians Rchb.f.
- Dendrobium radicosum Ridl.
- Dendrobium ramificans J.J.Sm.
- Dendrobium ramosii Ames
- Dendrobium rantii J.J.Sm.
- Dendrobium rariflorum J.J.Sm.
- Dendrobium rarum Schltr.
  - Dendrobium rarum var. miscegeneum Dauncey
  - Dendrobium rarum var. pelorium Dauncey
- Dendrobium ravanii Cootes
- Dendrobium rechingerorum Schltr.
- Dendrobium reconditum Schuit. & Peter B.Adams – closed burr orchid
- Dendrobium recurvatum (Blume) J.J.Sm.
- Dendrobium recurvifolium J.J.Sm.
- Dendrobium recurvilabre J.J.Sm.
- Dendrobium reflexitepalum J.J.Sm.
- Dendrobium reflexum Schuit. & de Vogel
- Dendrobium refractum Teijsm. & Binn.
- Dendrobium regale Schltr.
  - Dendrobium regale var. euanthum Schltr.
  - Dendrobium regale var. regale
- Dendrobium reginanivis P.O'Byrne & J.J.Verm
- Dendrobium regium Prain
- Dendrobium reineckei Schltr.
- Dendrobium remotisepalum J.J.Sm.
- Dendrobium rennellii P.J.Cribb
- Dendrobium repandum Schuit. & de Vogel
- Dendrobium restrepioides (W.Suarez & M.A.Clem.) J.M.H.Shaw
- Dendrobium revolutum Lindl.
- Dendrobium reypimentelli Cootes
- Dendrobium rhabdoglossum Schltr.
- Dendrobium rhipidolobum Schltr.
- Dendrobium rhodobalion Schltr.
- Dendrobium rhodocentrum Rchb.f.
- Dendrobium rhodochilum (Ferreras & Cootes) Schuit. & Peter B.Adams
- Dendrobium rhodostele Ridl.
- Dendrobium rhodostictum F.Muell. & Kraenzl.
- Dendrobium rhombeum Lindl.
- Dendrobium rhombopetalum Kraenzl.
- Dendrobium rhytidothece Schltr.
- Dendrobium rickscottianum P.O'Byrne & J.J.Verm
- Dendrobium ridleyanum Schltr.
- Dendrobium rigidifolium Rolfe
- Dendrobium rigidum R.Br. – smooth tongue orchid, smooth tick orchid
- Dendrobium rindjaniense J.J.Sm.
- Dendrobium riparium J.J.Sm.
- Dendrobium ritaeanum King & Pantl.
- Dendrobium roseatum Ridl.
- Dendrobium roseicolor A.D.Hawkes & A.H.Heller
- Dendrobium roseiodorum Sathap., T.Yukawa & Seelanan
- Dendrobium roseipes Schltr.
- Dendrobium rosellum Ridl.
- Dendrobium roseoflavidum Schltr.
- Dendrobium roseonervatum Schltr.
- Dendrobium roseonervatum Schltr.
- Dendrobium roseopunctatum Ridl.
- Dendrobium roseosparsum P.O'Byrne & J.J.Verm
- Dendrobium roseostriatum Ridl.
- Dendrobium rotundatum (Lindl.) Hook.f.
- Dendrobium rubroflavum Ormerod & Naive
- Dendrobium rubrostriatum Metusala, P.O'Byrne & J.J.Wood
- Dendrobium ruckeri Lindl.
- Dendrobium ruginosum Ames
- Dendrobium rugosum (Blume) Lindl.
- Dendrobium rugulosum J.J.Sm.
- Dendrobium rumphiae Rchb.f.
- Dendrobium rupestre J.J.Sm.
- Dendrobium rupicola Ridl.
- Dendrobium rupicoloides J.M.H.Shaw – northern rock orchid
- Dendrobium × ruppiosum Clemesha
- Dendrobium ruseae Besi & Dome
- Dendrobium rutriferum Rchb.f.
- Dendrobium ruttenii J.J.Sm.

== S ==
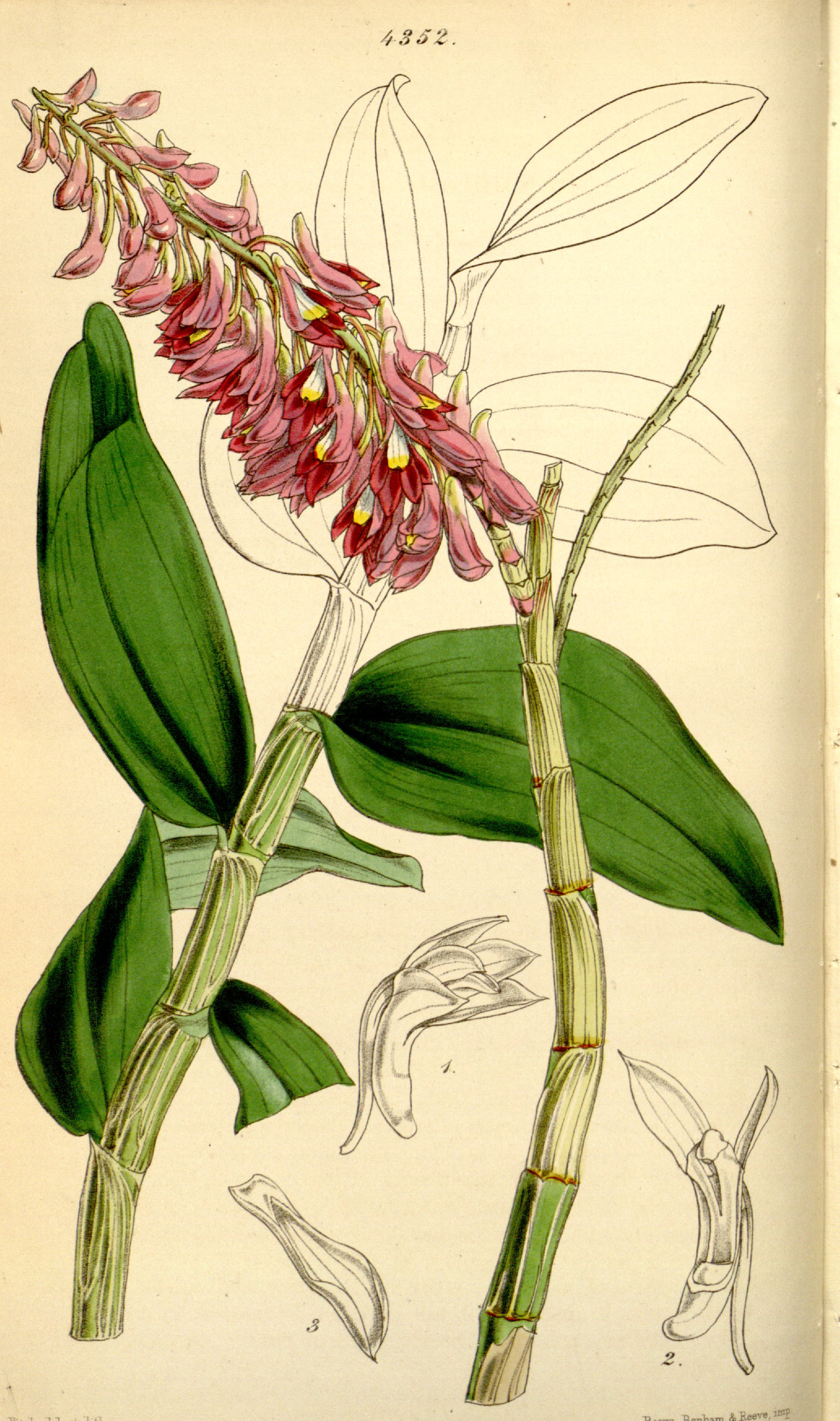
Dendrobium secundum

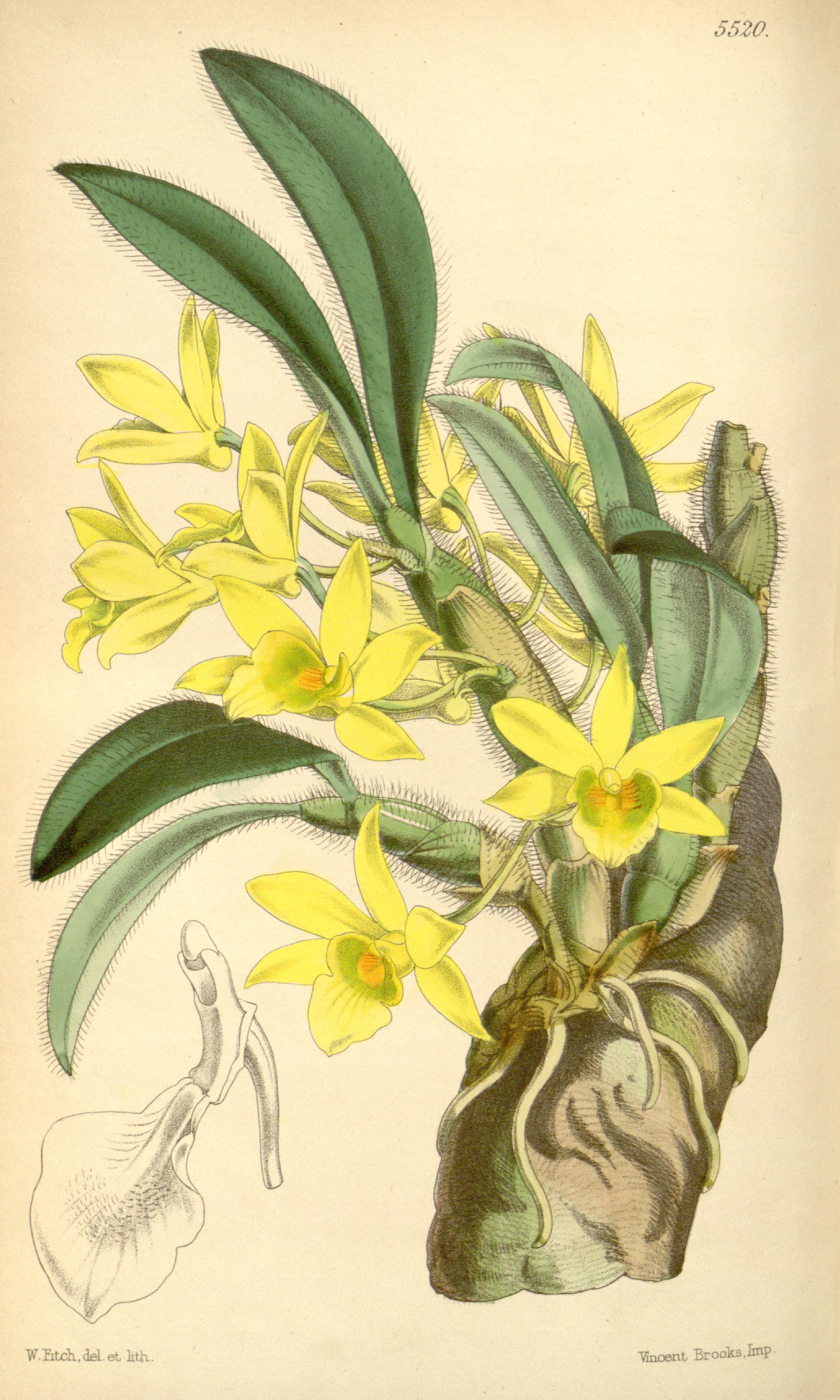
Dendrobium senile

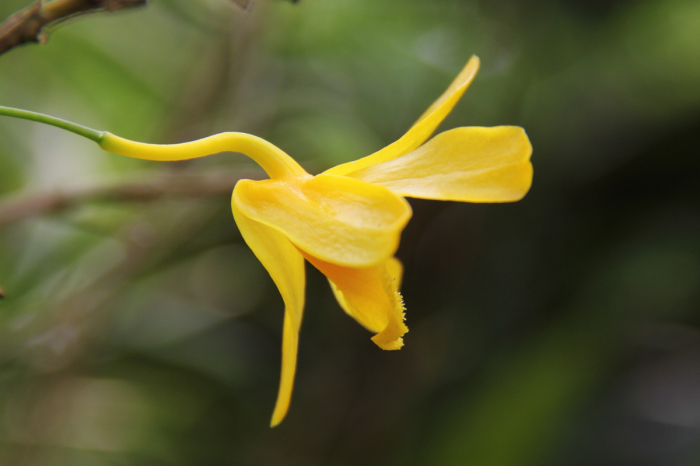
Dendrobium salaccense

- Dendrobium sabahense J.J.Wood
- Dendrobium sacculiferum J.J.Sm.
- Dendrobium sagin Saputra & Schuit.
- Dendrobium sagittatum J.J.Sm.
- Dendrobium salaccense (Blume) Lindl.
- Dendrobium salicifolium J.J.Sm.
- Dendrobium salmoneum Schltr.
- Dendrobium salomonense Schltr.
- Dendrobium sambasanum J.J.Sm.
- Dendrobium samoense P.J.Cribb
- Dendrobium sancristobalense P.J.Cribb
- Dendrobium sanderae Rolfe
- Dendrobium sandsii J.J.Wood & C.L.Chan
- Dendrobium sanguinolentum Lindl.
- Dendrobium sanseiense Hayata
- Dendrobium sarawakense Merr.
- Dendrobium sarcochilus Finet
  - Dendrobium sarcochilus var. megalorhizum (Kraenzl.) Hallé
  - Dendrobium sarcochilus var. sarcochilus
- Dendrobium sarcophyllum Schltr.
- Dendrobium sarmentosum Rolfe
- Dendrobium savannicola Schltr.
- Dendrobium sayeri Schltr.
- Dendrobium scabrilingue Lindl.
- Dendrobium schettleri Cootes
- Dendrobium schinzii Rolfe
- Dendrobium schistoglossum Schltr.
- Dendrobium schneiderae F.M.Bailey – moon orchid
  - Dendrobium schneiderae var. major Rupp
  - Dendrobium schneiderae var. schneiderae
- Dendrobium schoeninum Lindl. – common pencil orchid
- Dendrobium schouteniense J.J.Sm.
- Dendrobium schuetzei Rolfe
- Dendrobium schuitemanii Thoerle & P.O'Bryne
- Dendrobium schulleri J.J.Sm.
- Dendrobium schwartzkopfianum Kraenzl.
- Dendrobium schweinfurthianum A.D.Hawkes & A.H.Heller
- Dendrobium scirpoides Schltr.
- Dendrobium scopa Lindl.
- Dendrobium scopula Schltr.
- Dendrobium scoriarum W.W.Sm.
- Dendrobium scorpionis Ormerod
- Dendrobium scotiiforme J.J.Sm.
- Dendrobium sculptum Rchb.f..
- Dendrobium secundum (Blume) Lindl.
- Dendrobium sematoglossum Schltr.
- Dendrobium semendoense Romiyadi, Sumardi & Cootes
- Dendrobium senggiense de Vogel
- Dendrobium senile C.S.P.Parish & Rchb.f.
- Dendrobium sepikanum Schltr.
- Dendrobium septemcostulatum J.J.Sm.
- Dendrobium seranicum J.J.Sm.
- Dendrobium serena-alexianum J.J.Wood & A.L.Lamb
- Dendrobium serratilabium L.O.Williams
- Dendrobium serratipetalum Schltr.
- Dendrobium sessanicum Apang
- Dendrobium setifolium Ridl.
- Dendrobium setosum Schltr.
- Dendrobium sexcostatum de Vogel
- Dendrobium shearmanii Schuit. & de Vogel
- Dendrobium shiraishii T.Yukawa & M.Nishida
- Dendrobium shixingense Z.L.Chen, S.J.Zeng & Duan
- Dendrobium shompenii B.K.Sinha & P.S.N.Rao
- Dendrobium shamrii Ormerod
- Dendrobium siberutense J.J.Sm.
- Dendrobium sibilense Ormerod
- Dendrobium sibuyanense Lubag-Arquiza
- Dendrobium sidikalangense Dauncey
- Dendrobium siewhongii (P.O'Byrne) J.M.H.Shaw
- Dendrobium signatum Rchb.f.
- Dendrobium similissimum Ormerod
- Dendrobium simondii Gagnep.
- Dendrobium simplex J.J.Sm.
- Dendrobium singaporense A.D.Hawkes & A.H.Heller
- Dendrobium singkawangense J.J.Sm.
- Dendrobium singulare Ames & C.Schweinf.
- Dendrobium sinianum P.O'Byrne
- Dendrobium sinominutiflorum S.C.Chen, J.J.Wood & H.P.Wood
- Dendrobium sinsuronense J.J.Wood
- Dendrobium sinuosum Ames
- Dendrobium sirophyton Schuit. & de Vogel
- Dendrobium sitanalae J.J.Sm.
- Dendrobium sladei J.J.Wood & P.J.Cribb
- Dendrobium sleumeri Ormerod
- Dendrobium smillieae F.Muell. – bottlebrush orchid
- Dendrobium smithianum Schltr.
- Dendrobium solomonense (Carr) Schuit. & Peter B.Adams
- Dendrobium somae Hayata
- Dendrobium soriense Howcroft
- Dendrobium sororium Schltr.
- Dendrobium spatella Rchb.f.
- Dendrobium spathilabium Ames & C.Schweinf.
- Dendrobium spathilingue J.J.Sm.
- Dendrobium spathipetalum J.J.Sm.
- Dendrobium spathulatum L.O.Williams
- Dendrobium × speciokingianum T.Lawr.
- Dendrobium speciosum Sm. – rock orchids
  - Dendrobium speciosum var. blackdownense Peter B.Adams
  - Dendrobium speciosum var. boreale Peter B.Adams, Jac.M.Burke & S.D.Lawson
  - Dendrobium speciosum var. capricornicum Clemesha – Capricorn rock orchid
  - Dendrobium speciosum var. carnarvonense Peter B.Adams – gorge pink rock orchid
  - Dendrobium speciosum var. curvicaule F.M.Bailey – rainforest rock orchid
  - Dendrobium speciosum var. grandiflorum F.M.Bailey – golden king orchid
  - Dendrobium speciosum var. hillii Mast. – pale king orchid
  - Dendrobium speciosum var. pedunculatum Clemesha – dwarf rock orchid
  - Dendrobium speciosum var. speciosum – Sydney rock orchid, rock lily
- Dendrobium speckmaieri Fessel & Lückel
- Dendrobium spectabile (Blume) Miq.
- Dendrobium spectatissimum Rchb.f.
- Dendrobium speculum J.J.Sm.
- Dendrobium spenceanum Ormerod
- Dendrobium sphenochilum F.Muell. & Kraenzl.
- Dendrobium spiculatum Schuit
- Dendrobium spinuliferum Ormerod
- Dendrobium spurium (Blume) J.J.Sm.
- Dendrobium squamiferum J.J.Sm.
- Dendrobium steatoglossum Rchb.f.
- Dendrobium steinii J.J.Sm.
- Dendrobium stelidiiferum J.J.Sm.
- Dendrobium stella-portus Ormerod
- Dendrobium stella-silvae (Loher & Kraenzl.) Ames
- Dendrobium stellare Dauncey
- Dendrobium stelliferum J.J.Sm.
- Dendrobium stenocentrum Schltr.
- Dendrobium stenoglossum Gagnep.
- Dendrobium stenophyllum Schltr.
- Dendrobium stenophytoides (P.O'Byrne & J.J.Verm.) Schuit. & Peter B.Adams
- Dendrobium stenophyton Schltr.
- Dendrobium stictanthum Schltr.
- Dendrobium stipiticola Ormerod
- Dendrobium stockeri T.Yukawa
- Dendrobium stolleanum Schltr.
- Dendrobium stratiotes Rchb.f.
- Dendrobium straussianum Schltr.
- Dendrobium strebloceras Rchb.f.
- Dendrobium strepsiceros J.J.Sm.
- Dendrobium stricticalcarum W.Suarez & Cootes
- Dendrobium striolatum Rchb.f. – streaked rock orchid
- Dendrobium strongylanthum Rchb.f.
- Dendrobium strongyloflorum J.J.Wood
- Dendrobium stuposum Lindl.
- Dendrobium subacaule Reinw. ex Lindl.
- Dendrobium subbilobatum Schltr.
- Dendrobium subcarinatum Ormerod
- Dendrobium subclausum Rolfe
  - Dendrobium subclausum var. pandanicola J.J.Wood
  - Dendrobium subclausum var. phlox (Schltr.) J.J.Wood
  - Dendrobium subclausum var. speciosum J.J.Wood
  - Dendrobium subclausum var. subclausum
- Dendrobium subelobatum J.J.Sm.
- Dendrobium subfalcatum J.J.Sm.
- Dendrobium subflavidum Ridl.
- Dendrobium subintegrum (P.J.Cribb & B.A.Lewis) Schuit. & Peter B.Adams
- Dendrobium sublobatum J.J.Sm.
- Dendrobium subpandifolium J.J.Sm.
- Dendrobium subpetiolatum Schltr.
- Dendrobium subquadratum J.J.Sm.
- Dendrobium subradiatum J.J.Sm.
- Dendrobium subretusum J.J.Sm.
- Dendrobium subserratum Schltr.
- Dendrobium subtricostatum J.J.Sm.
- Dendrobium subulatoides Schltr.
- Dendrobium subulatum (Blume) Lindl.
- Dendrobium subuliferum J.J.Sm.
- Dendrobium × suffusum Cady
- Dendrobium sulcatum Lindl.
- Dendrobium sulphureum Schltr.
  - Dendrobium sulphureum var. cellulosum (J.J.Sm.) T.M.Reeve & P.Woods
  - Dendrobium sulphureum var. rigidifolium T.M.Reeve & P.Woods
  - Dendrobium sulphureum var. sulphureum
- Dendrobium summerhayesianum A.D.Hawkes & A.H.Heller
- Dendrobium superans J.J.Sm.
- Dendrobium × superbiens Rchb.f.
  - Dendrobium × superbiens nothovar. superbiens
  - Dendrobium × superbiens nothovar. vinicolor (St.Cloud) Ormerod
- Dendrobium sutepense Rolfe ex Downie
- Dendrobium sutiknoi (P.O'Byrne
- Dendrobium suzukii T.Yukawa
- Dendrobium swartzii A.D.Hawkes & A.H.Heller
- Dendrobium sylvanum Rchb.f.

== T ==
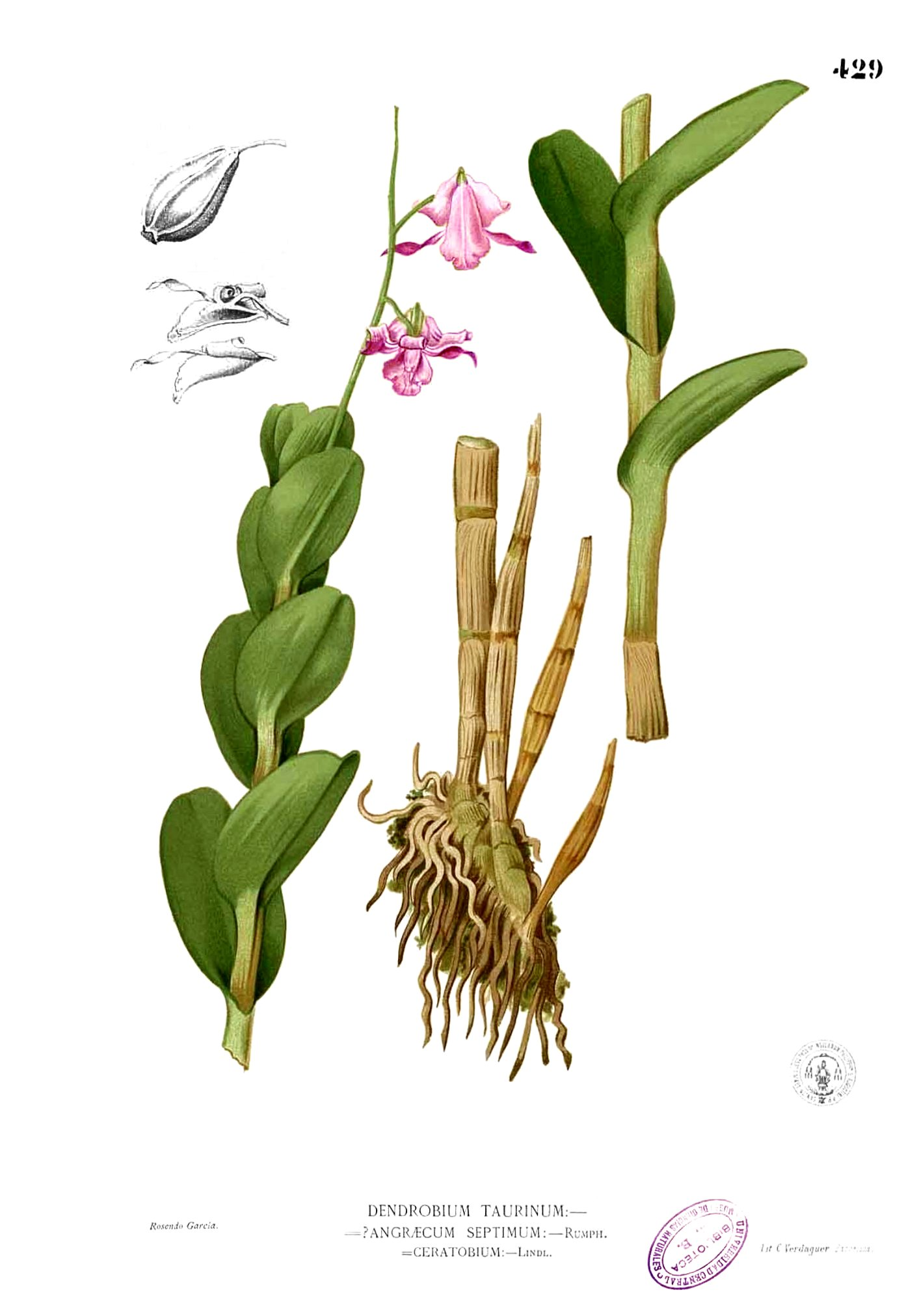
Dendrobium taurinum

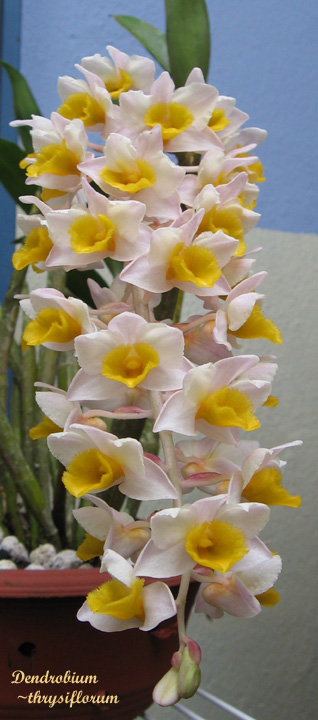
Dendrobium thyrsiflorum

- Dendrobium taeniocaule Schuit., Juswara & Droissart
- Dendrobium takadui (Schltr.) J.J.Sm.
- Dendrobium tampangii P.O'Byrne
- Dendrobium tangerinum P.J.Cribb
- Dendrobium tanjiewhoei J.J.Wood & C.L.Chan
- Dendrobium tapiniense T.M.Reeve
- Dendrobium taprobanium Atthan., Priyad., Wijew., Aberantha, Peabot. & Kumar
- Dendrobium tarawalla Ormerod
- Dendrobium taurinum Lindl.
- Dendrobium taurulinum J.J.Sm.
- Dendrobium taveuniense Dauncey & P.J.Cribb
- Dendrobium tawauense J.J.Wood
- Dendrobium taylorii (F.Muell.) F.M.Bailey – smooth burr orchid
- Dendrobium teloense J.J.Sm.
- Dendrobium tenellum (Blume) Lindl.
- Dendrobium tentaculatum Schltr.
- Dendrobium tenue J.J.Sm.
- Dendrobium tenuicaule Hook.f.
- Dendrobium terengganuensis Rosli & Latiff
- Dendrobium teretifolium R.Br. – thin pencil orchid
- Dendrobium terminale C.S.P.Parish & Rchb.f.
- Dendrobium tetrachromum Rchb.f.
- Dendrobium tetraedre (Blume) Lindl.
- Dendrobium tetragonum A.Cunn. ex Lindl. – tree spider orchid
  - Dendrobium tetragonum var. cacatua (D.L.Jones & M.A.Clem.) H.Mohr – yellow tree spider orchid
  - Dendrobium tetragonum subsp. cataractarum Peter B.Adams, S.D.Lawson & G.A.Peterson
  - Dendrobium tetragonum subsp. giganteum (Leaney) Peter B.Adams - blotched tree spider orchid
  - Dendrobium tetragonum subsp. melaleucaphilum (D.L.Jones & M.A.Clem.) Dockrill – flared tree spider orchid
  - Dendrobium tetragonum subsp. serpentis Peter B.Adams
  - Dendrobium tetragonum subsp. tetragonum - banded tree spider orchid
- Dendrobium tetralobatum (P.O'Byrne & J.J.Verm.) Schuit. & Peter B.Adams
- Dendrobium tetralobum Schltr.
- Dendrobium textile J.J.Sm.
  - Dendrobium textile var. haematostictum (P.O'Byrne & J.J.Verm.) Schuit. & Peter B.Adams
  - Dendrobium textile var. textile
- Dendrobium thinii Aver.
- Dendrobium thyrsiflorum B.S.Williams
  - Dendrobium thyrsiflorum var. minutiflorum Aver.
  - Dendrobium thyrsiflorum var. thyrsiflorum
- Dendrobium thyrsodes Rchb.f.
- Dendrobium thysanophorum Schltr.
- Dendrobium tinukariensis Sulist., & P.O'Byrne
- Dendrobium tiongii Cootes
- Dendrobium tipula J.J.Sm.
- Dendrobium tipuliferum Rchb.f.
- Dendrobium tobaense J.J.Wood & J.B.Comber
- Dendrobium tokai Rchb.f.
- Dendrobium tomaniense J.J.Wood
- Dendrobium toppiorum A.L.Lamb & J.J.Wood
  - Dendrobium toppiorum subsp. taitayorum (P.O'Byrne
  - Dendrobium toppiorum subsp. toppiorum
- Dendrobium torajaense P.O'Byrne
- Dendrobium toressae (F.M.Bailey) Dockrill – sparkle orchid, mica orchid
- Dendrobium torquisepalum Kraenzl.
- Dendrobium torricellense Schltr.
- Dendrobium tortile Lindl.
- Dendrobium tortitepalum J.J.Sm.
- Dendrobium toxopei J.J.Sm.
- Dendrobium tozerense Lavarack – white gemini orchid
- Dendrobium trachythece Schltr.
- Dendrobium trankimianum T.Yukawa
- Dendrobium transparens Wall. ex Lindl.
- Dendrobium transtilliferum J.J.Sm.
- Dendrobium trantuanii Perner & X.N.Dang
- Dendrobium treacherianum Rchb.f. ex Hook.f.
- Dendrobium treubii J.J.Sm.
- Dendrobium treutleri (Hook.f.) Schuit. & Peter B.Adams
- Dendrobium triangulum J.J.Sm.
- Dendrobium tricallosum Ames & C.Schweinf.
- Dendrobium trichosepalum Gilli
- Dendrobium trichostomum Rchb.f. ex Oliv.
- Dendrobium tricristatum Schuit. & Peter B.Adams
- Dendrobium tricuspe (Blume) Lindl.
- Dendrobium tridentatum Ames & C.Schweinf.
- Dendrobium tridentiferum Lindl.
- Dendrobium trifurcatum (Carr) Schuit. & Peter B.Adams
- Dendrobium trigonellodorum Kraenzl.
- Dendrobium trigonopus Rchb.f.
- Dendrobium trilamellatum J.J.Sm. – fragrant tea tree orchid, large tea tree orchid
- Dendrobium trilobulatum Kores
- Dendrobium trinervium Ridl.
- Dendrobium triquetrum Ridl.
- Dendrobium triste Schltr.
- Dendrobium tropaeoliflorum Hook.f.
- Dendrobium tropidophorum Schltr.
- Dendrobium trullatum J.J.Wood & A.L.Lamb
- Dendrobium truncatum Lindl.
- Dendrobium truncicola Schltr.
- Dendrobium truongcuongii Aver. & V.C.Nguyen
- Dendrobium tsangianum (Ormerod) Schuit. & Peter B.Adams
- Dendrobium tsii Schuit. & Peter B.Adams
- Dendrobium tuberculatum J.J.Sm.
- Dendrobium tubiflorum J.J.Sm.
- Dendrobium tuensangense Odyuo & C.Deori
- Dendrobium tunense J.J.Sm.
- Dendrobium × tungchii N.H.Tuan, C.X.Canh & O.Gruss
- Dendrobium turbinatum Ormerod & C.S.Kumar

== U ==
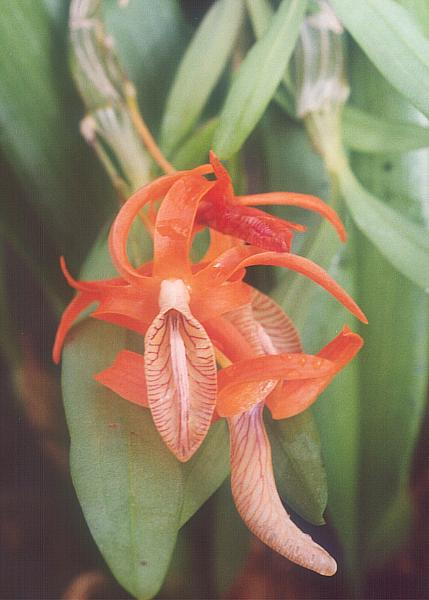
Dendrobium unicum

- Dendrobium uliginosum J.J.Sm.
- Dendrobium umbellatum (Gaudich.) Rchb.f.
- Dendrobium umbonatum Seidenf.
- Dendrobium uncatum Lindl.
- Dendrobium uncipes J.J.Sm.
- Dendrobium undatialatum Schltr.
- Dendrobium unibulbe (Seidenf.) Schuit. & Peter B.Adams
- Dendrobium unicarinatum Kores
- Dendrobium unicorne Ames
- Dendrobium unicum Seidenf.
- Dendrobium uniflorum Griff.
- Dendrobium × usitae T.Yukawa
- Dendrobium usterii Schltr.
- Dendrobium usterioides Ames
- Dendrobium ustulatum Carr
- Dendrobium utile J.J.Sm.

== V ==
- Dendrobium vagabundum A.D.Hawkes & A.H.Heller
- Dendrobium vagans Schltr.
- Dendrobium validicolle J.J.Sm.
- Dendrobium vanderwateri Ridl.
- Dendrobium vandifolium Finet
- Dendrobium vandoides Schltr.
- Dendrobium vanhulstijnii J.J.Sm.
- Dendrobium vanilliodorum J.J.Sm.
- Dendrobium vanleeuwenii J.J.Sm.
- Dendrobium vannouhuysii J.J.Sm.
  - Dendrobium vannouhuysii var. rhombipetalum J.J.Sm.
  - Dendrobium vannouhuysii var. vannouhuysii
- Dendrobium vanuatuense (Seidenf.) Schuit. & Peter B.Adams
- Dendrobium veillonii M.Pignal
- Dendrobium velutinelabrum M.A.Clem. & Cootes
- Dendrobium ventricosum Kraenzl.
- Dendrobium venustum Teijsm. & Binn.
- Dendrobium vernicosum Schltr.
- Dendrobium verruciferum Rchb.f.
- Dendrobium verruciflorum Schltr.
- Dendrobium verruculosum Schltr.
- Dendrobium versteegii J.J.Sm.
- Dendrobium vesiculosumM.A.Clem. & D.L.Jones
- Dendrobium vestigiiferum J.J.Sm.
- Dendrobium × vexabile Rchb.f.
- Dendrobium vexillarius J.J.Sm.
  - Dendrobium vexillarius var. albiviride (P.Royen) T.M.Reeve & P.Woods
  - Dendrobium vexillarius var. elworthyi T.M.Reeve & P.Woods
  - Dendrobium vexillarius var. hansmeyerense Howcroft & W.N.Takeuchi
  - Dendrobium vexillarius var. microblepharum (Schltr.) T.M.Reeve & P.Woods
  - Dendrobium vexillarius var. minor (P.Royen) Ormerod
  - Dendrobium vexillarius var. retroflexum (J.J.Sm.) T.M.Reeve & P.Woods
  - Dendrobium vexillarius var. uncinatum (Schltr.) T.M.Reeve & P.Woods
  - Dendrobium vexillarius var. vexillarius
- Dendrobium victoriae-reginae Loher
- Dendrobium vietnamense Aver.
- Dendrobium villosulum Wall. ex Lindl.
- Dendrobium vinosum Schltr.
- Dendrobium violaceoflavens J.J.Sm.
- Dendrobium violaceominiatum Schltr.
- Dendrobium violaceopictum Schltr.
- Dendrobium violaceum Kraenzl.
  - Dendrobium violaceum ssp. cyperifolium (Schltr.) T.M.Reeve & P.Woods
  - Dendrobium violaceum ssp. violaceum
- Dendrobium violascens J.J.Sm.
- Dendrobium virgineum Rchb.f.
- Dendrobium viridiflorum F.M.Bailey
- Dendrobium viridulum Ridl.
- Dendrobium virotii Guillaumin.
- Dendrobium vitiense Rolfe
- Dendrobium vogelsangii P.O'Byrne
- Dendrobium × vonpaulsenianum A.D.Hawkes
- Dendrobium vonroemeri J.J.Sm.

== W ==
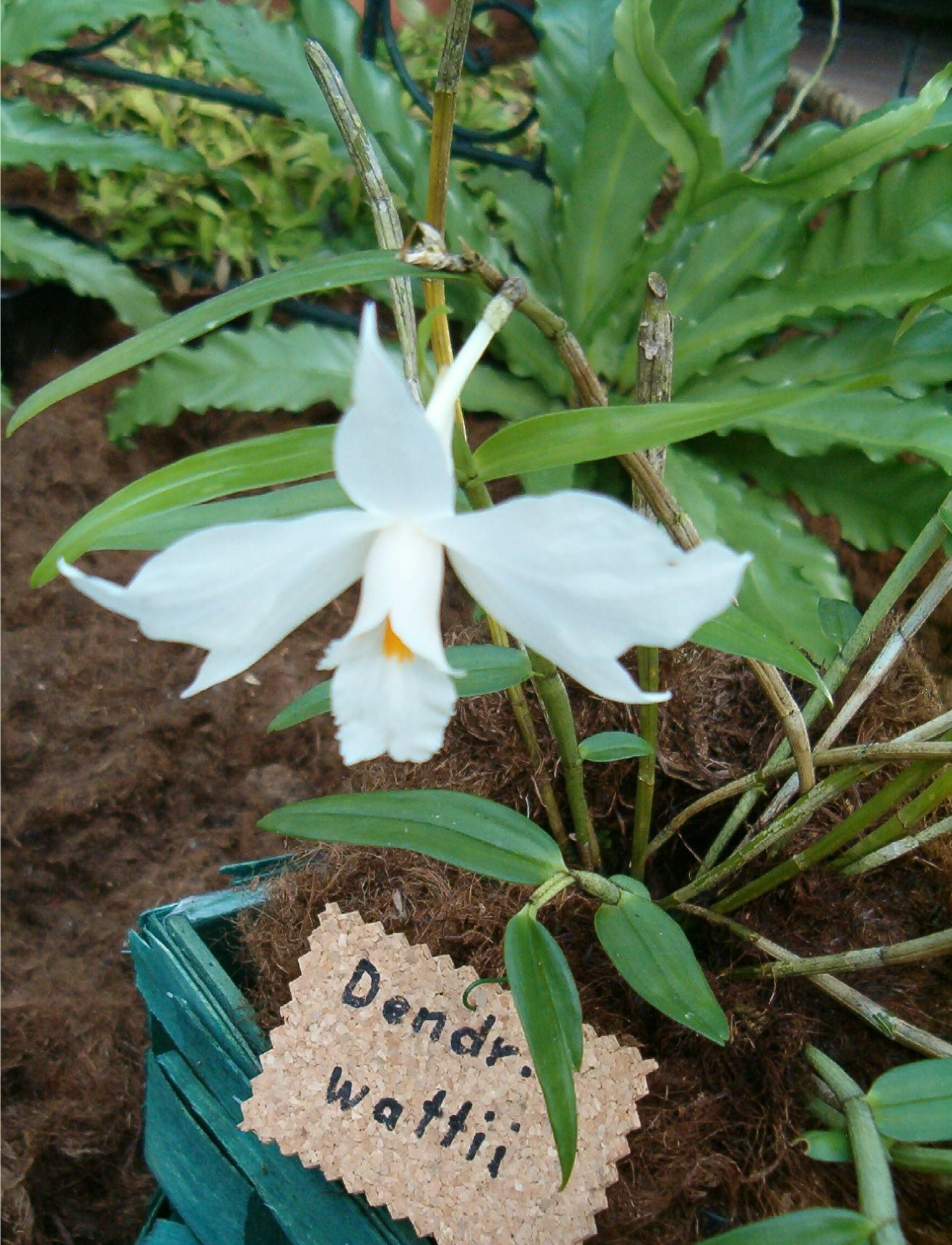
Dendrobium wattii

- Dendrobium wangliangii G.W.Hu, C.L.Long & X.H.Jin
- Dendrobium wantipiense Ormerod
- Dendrobium wardianum Warner
- Dendrobium wassellii S.T.Blake – furrowed pencil orchid
- Dendrobium wattii (Hook.f.) Rchb.f.
- Dendrobium wekainense Ormerod
- Dendrobium wenshanense Q.Xu, Y.B.Luo & Z.J.Liu
- Dendrobium wentianum J.J.Sm.
- Dendrobium wenzelii Ames
- Dendrobium whistleri P.J.Cribb
- Dendrobium whichersii Schltr.
- Dendrobium widjajanum Ormerod
- Dendrobium × wiganiae Mast.
- Dendrobium wightii A.D.Hawkes & A.H.Heller
- Dendrobium williamsianum Rchb.f.
  - Dendrobium williamsianum var. chanii McCraith
  - Dendrobium williamsianum var. williamsianum
- Dendrobium williamsonii Alva George DayDay & Rchb.f.
- Dendrobium wilsonii Rolfe
- Dendrobium wisselense P.J.Cribb
- Dendrobium wollastonii Ridl. ex R.H.Pearson
- Dendrobium woluense J.J.Sm.
- Dendrobium womersleyi T.M.Reeve
  - Dendrobium womersleyi var. autophilum Dauncey
  - Dendrobium womersleyi var. womersleyi
- Dendrobium woodsii P.J.Cribb
- Dendrobium wulaiense Howcroft

== X ==
- Dendrobium xanthoacron Schltr.
- Dendrobium xanthogenium Schltr.
- Dendrobium xantholeucum Rchb.f..
- Dendrobium xanthomeson Schltr.
- Dendrobium xanthophlebium Lindl.
- Dendrobium xanthothece Schltr.
- Dendrobium xichouensis S.J.Cheng & Z.Z.Tang
- Dendrobium xiphophyllum Schltr.
- Dendrobium xylophyllum Kraenzl.

== Y ==
- Dendrobium yeageri Ames & Quisumb.
- Dendrobium × yengiliense T.M.Reeve
- Dendrobium yondaliae Ormerod
- Dendrobium yongii J.J.Wood
- Dendrobium yongjiaense Zhang Zhou & S.R.Lan
- Dendrobium ypsilon Seidenf.
- Dendrobium yulianiae Schuit. & P.O'Byrne

== Z ==
- Dendrobium zamboangense Ames & Quisumb.
- Dendrobium zebrinum J.J.Sm.
- Dendrobium zhenghuoense S.P.Chen, Liang Ma & M.He Li
- Dendrobium zhenyuanense D.P.Ye ex Jian W.Li, D.P.Ye & X.H.Jin
