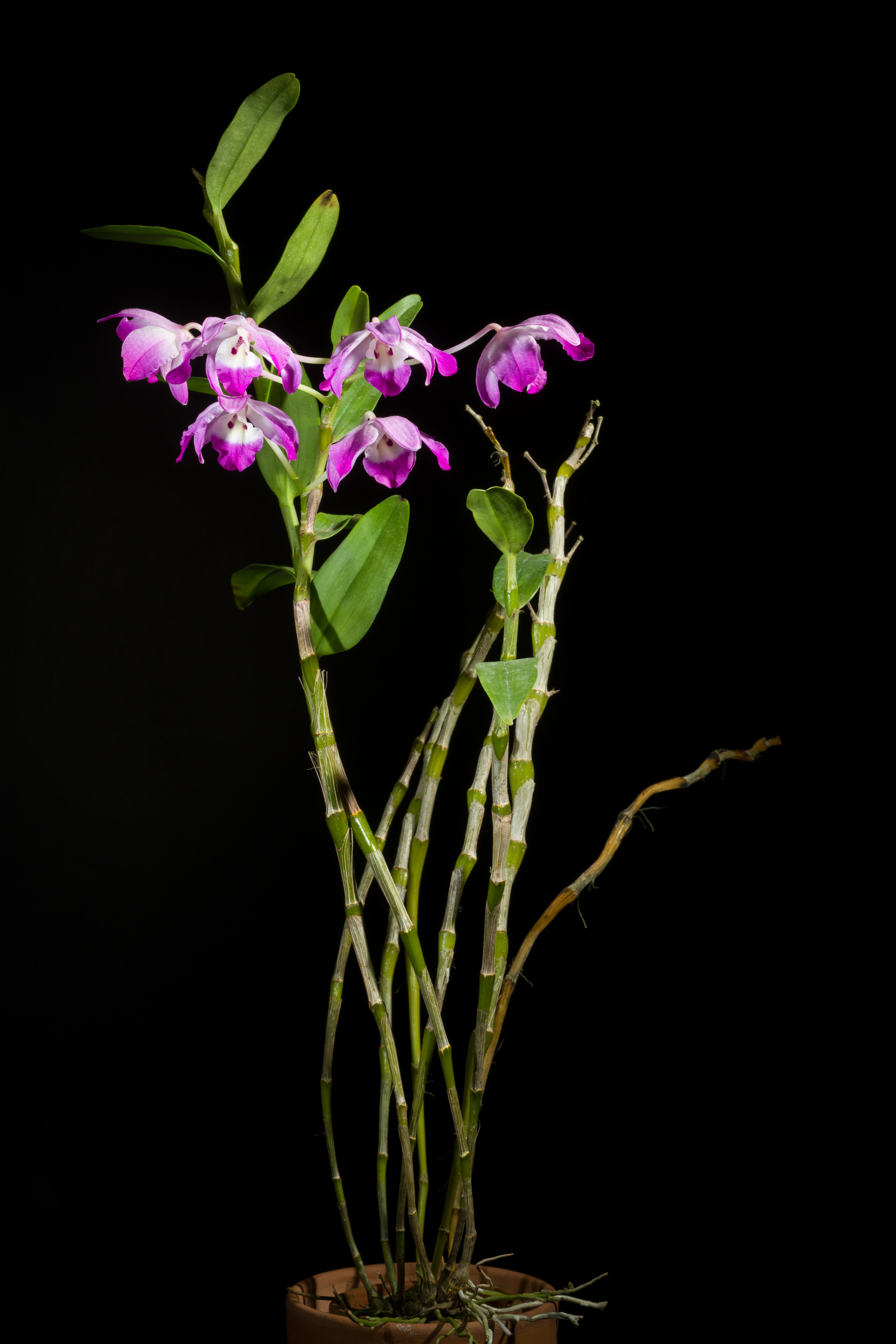
- Dendrobium nobile

Scientific classification
- Kingdom: Plantae
- Clade: Tracheophytes
- Clade: Angiosperms
- Clade: Monocots
- Order: Asparagales
- Family: Orchidaceae
- Subfamily: Epidendroideae
- Genus: Dendrobium
- Section: Dendrobium sect. Dendrobium; Lindley 1844

Type species
- Dendrobium moniliforme

Species
- See text

Synonyms
- List: Onynchium [Bl.] Blume 1825; Ormostema Raf. 1836/38; Pierardia Raf. 1836/28; Dendrobium sect. Actinomorpha Pradhan 1979; Dendrobium sect. Aquea Kraenzl. 1910; Dendrobium sect. Aureum Kraenzl 1910; Dendrobium sect. Aureasubsect. Moniliformia Kraenzl 1910; Dendrobium sect. Aureasubsect. Percnochila Kraenzl 1910; Dendrobium sect. Aureasubsect. Subcylindricea Kraenzl 1910; Dendrobium sect. Chrysantha Rchb.f 1861; Dendrobium sect. Eudendrobium Lindley 1851; Dendrobium sect. Eudendrobium subsect. Chrysantha Rchb.f 1853; Dendrobium sect. Eudendrobium subsect. Fasciculata Benth & Hkr.f. 1883; Dendrobium sect. Eudendrobium subsect. Grandia Rchb.f 1853; Dendrobium sect. Eudendrobium subsect. Nobilia Pfitz 1889; Dendrobium sect. Eudendrobium subsect. Trilobata Pfitz 1889; Dendrobium sect. Eugenanthe Schltr 1912; Dendrobium sect. Glomerata subsect. Brachycentra Kraenzl 1910; Dendrobium sect. Macrostachya Kraenzl 1910; Dendrobium sect. Nobilia [Pfitzer] Kraenzl 1910; Dendrobium sect. Nobilia subsect. Fimbrilabia Kraenzl 1910; Dendrobium sect. Nobilia subsect. Integrilabia Kraenzl 1910; Dendrobium sect. Onynchium Bl 1825; Dendrobium sect. Planifolia Rchb.f 1861; Dendrobium subg. Eudendrobium Kraenzl 1910; Dendrobium subg. Eugenanthe Royen 1979; Transparentia Rchb.f 1853

= Dendrobium sect. Dendrobium =

Subgenus of flowering plants

Dendrobium section Dendrobium is a section of the genus Dendrobium.

== Description ==
Plants in this section have moderate length thin pseudobulbs with leaves at upper two thirds of the pseudobulb.

== Distribution ==
Plants from this section are found from India to New Guinea and Australia in the east and Japan and Korea.

== Species ==
Dendrobium section Dendrobium comprises the following species:

Image	Name	Distribution	Elevation (m)
	Dendrobium albosanguineum Lindley & Paxt. 1852	Myanmar and Thailand	300–600 metres (980–1,970 ft)
	Dendrobium amoenum Wallich ex Lindley 1830	western Himalayas, India, Assam, eastern Himalayas, Nepal, Bhutan, Sikkim, Bangladesh and Myanmar	600–2,000 metres (2,000–6,600 ft)
	Dendrobium anosmum Lindley 1845	Malaysia, Laos, Vietnam, Hong Kong, Philippines, Indonesia, and Papua and New Guinea	1,300 metres (4,300 ft)
	Dendrobium aphrodite Rchb.f 1862	Myanmar and Thailand	1,400 metres (4,600 ft)
	Dendrobium aphyllum (Roxb.) C.E.C. Fisch. 1928	Hainan China, Assam, Bangladesh, eastern Himalayas, India, Maldive Islands, Nepal, Sri Lanka, western Himalayas, Andaman Islands, Myanmar, Thailand, Laos, Malaysia, Borneo, Java, Sumatra, Lesser Sunda Islands, Sulawesi and Queensland Australia	150–1,800 metres (490–5,910 ft)
	Dendrobium atavus J.J.Sm. 1905	Java	790 metres (2,590 ft)
	Dendrobium bensoniae Rchb. f. 1867	Asssam, Myanmar and Thailand	450–1,550 metres (1,480–5,090 ft)
	Dendrobium catenatum Lindley 1830	Korea and China, southwestern Japan and south to Taiwan	300–1,600 metres (980–5,250 ft)
	Dendrobium chlorostylum Gagnep. 1950	southern China and northern Vietnam	
	Dendrobium chrysanthum Wallich ex Lindley 1828	western Himalayas, Assam India, China, Nepal, Bhutan, Sikkim, Myanmar, Thailand, Laos and Vietnam	350–2,200 metres (1,150–7,220 ft)
	Dendrobium crepidatum Lindl. & Paxton 1850	Hainan China, Assam, Bangladesh, eastern Himalayas, India, Nepal, Sikkim, western Himalayas, Myanmar, Thailand, Laos and Vietnam	600–2,100 metres (2,000–6,900 ft)
	Dendrobium crystallinum Rchb. f. 1868	Chinese Himalayas, Myanmar, Thailand, Laos, Cambodia and Vietnam	700–1,700 metres (2,300–5,600 ft)
	Dendrobium devonianum Paxton 1840	Chinese Himalayas, Assam, eastern Himalayas, Bhutan, Myanmar, Thailand, Laos, southern China and Vietnam	500–2,000 metres (1,600–6,600 ft)
	Dendrobium dickasonii L.O.Williams 1940	India, Myanmar and Thailand	1,500–1,800 metres (4,900–5,900 ft)
	Dendrobium falconeri Hook. f. 1856	Assam India, Chinese Himalayas, eastern Himalayas, Bhutan, Myanmar, Thailand and Taiwan	800–1,900 metres (2,600–6,200 ft)
	Dendrobium fanjingshanense Z.H.Tsi ex X.H.Jin & Y.W.Zhang 2001	Guizhou Province of China	800–1,500 metres (2,600–4,900 ft)
	Dendrobium findlayanum Par. & Rchb.f 1874	Chinese Himalayas, Myanmar, Thailand and Laos	1,000–1,700 metres (3,300–5,600 ft)
	Dendrobium flexicaule Z.H.Tsi, S.C.Sun & L.G.Xu 1986	southcentral Sichuan, eastern Hunan, Hubei and Henan Provinces of China	1,200–2,000 metres (3,900–6,600 ft)
	Dendrobium friedericksianum Rchb.f 1887	Thailand, Malaysia and Cambodia	
	Dendrobium fuscifaucium Souvann. & Kumar 2022	Laos	
	Dendrobium gratiosissimum Rchb. f. 1865	Hainan China, Assam, Myanmar, Thailand, Laos and Vietnam	500–1,700 metres (1,600–5,600 ft)
	Dendrobium hekouense Z.J.Liu & L.J.Chen 2011	Yunnan China	1,000–2,000 metres (3,300–6,600 ft)
	Dendrobium heterocarpum Wall. ex Lindl. 1830	Chinese Himalayas, Assam, eastern Himalayas, Nepal, Bhutan, Sikkim, Sri Lanka, Myanmar, Thailand, Laos, Vietnam, Borneo, Java, Lesser Sunda Islands, Sumatra, Sulawesi and the Philippines	100–1,800 metres (330–5,910 ft)
	Dendrobium hookerianum Lindl. 1859	Bangladesh, Assam, the eastern Himalayas and Myanmar	1,000–2,000 metres (3,300–6,600 ft)
	Dendrobium jinghuanum B.Q.Zheng & Y.Wang 2020	1,300 metres (4,300 ft)	
	Dendrobium lamyaiae G.Seidenfaden 1996	Laos and Thailand	
	Dendrobium lasioglossum Rchb.f. 1868	New Guinea	
	Dendrobium leptocladum Hayata 1914	Nantou and Taidong Taiwan	600–1,600 metres (2,000–5,200 ft)
	Dendrobium linawianum Rchb.f. 1861	Taiwan and Kwangsi province in southern China	400–1,500 metres (1,300–4,900 ft)
	Dendrobium lituiflorum Lindley 1856	Chinese Himalayas, Assam, Bangladesh, eastern Himalayas, Myanmar, Thailand, Laos and Vietnam	300 metres (980 ft)
	Dendrobium loddigesii Rolfe 1887	Laos, Vietnam, Guangdong, Guangxi, Guizhou, Hainan and Yunnan provinces of China and Hong Kong	1,000–1,500 metres (3,300–4,900 ft)
	Dendrobium luoi L.J.Chen & W.H.Rao 2016	Hunan China	
	Dendrobium maccarthiae Thwaites 1855	Sri Lanka	
	Dendrobium macrostachyum Lindl. 1830	Assam, Bangladesh, eastern Himalayas, Maldive Islands, India, Nepal, western Himalayas, Sri Lanka, Myanmar, Thailand, Malaysia, Laos, Vietnam, Borneo, Java, Lesser Sunda Islands, Sumatra, Sulawesi and Queensland Australia	1,200 metres (3,900 ft)
	Dendrobium moniliforme (L.) Sw. 1799	China, Western Himalayas, Nepal, eastern Himalayas, Assam, Myanmar, Vietnam, Korea, Japan except Hokkaido and Taiwan	800–3,000 metres (2,600–9,800 ft)
	Dendrobium nobile Lindley 1830	Chinese Himalayas, Assam, eastern Himalayas, India, Nepal, Bhutan, Sikkim, Myanmar, Thailand, Laos and Vietnam	200–2,000 metres (660–6,560 ft)
	Dendrobium ochreatum Lindl.1828	Myanmar, Thailand and Vietnam	1,200–1,600 metres (3,900–5,200 ft)
	Dendrobium officinale Kimura & Migo 1936	China	1,200–1,600 metres (3,900–5,200 ft)
	Dendrobium okinawense Hatus. & Ida, J. 1970	Nansei-shoto [Okinawa] Japan and Taidong Taiwan	900–1,200 metres (3,000–3,900 ft)
	Dendrobium parishii Rchb.f 1863	Hainan China, Assam, Bangladesh, eastern Himalayas, Myanmar, Thailand, Laos and Vietnam	250–1,700 metres (820–5,580 ft)
	Dendrobium pendulum Roxb. 1832	Hainan and Tibet China, Assam, Bangladesh, Myanmar, Thailand, Laos and Vietnam	760–1,600 metres (2,490–5,250 ft)
	Dendrobium perulatum Gagnep. 1950	Vietnam	
	Dendrobium pogoniates Rchb.f. 1886	Borneo	300 metres (980 ft)
	Dendrobium polyanthum Wall. ex Lindl. 1830	Chinese Himalayas, Assam, eastern Himalayas, India, Nepal, western Himalayas, Andaman Islands, Myanmar, Thailand, Laos and Vietnam	700–1,800 metres (2,300–5,900 ft)
	Dendrobium regium Prain 1902	Chhattisgarh, Jharkhand and Orissa India	600 metres (2,000 ft)
	Dendrobium rhombeum Lindley 1843	Sumatra	500–1,500 metres (1,600–4,900 ft)
	Dendrobium ruckeri Lindl. 1843	Assam, eastern Himalayas, Myanmar	1,300–1,700 metres (4,300–5,600 ft)
	Dendrobium scoriarum W. W. Sm. 1921	China and Vietnam	1,200 metres (3,900 ft)
	Dendrobium shixingense Z.L.Chen, S.J.Zeng & J.Duan 2010	Guangdong China	
	Dendrobium signatum Rchb. f. 1884	Myanmar, Thailand, Laos and Vietnam	200–1,500 metres (660–4,920 ft)
	Dendrobium stuartii F.M.Bailey 1884	Thailand, peninsular Malaysia, Java, Sumatra, Bali, Borneo to Queensland Australia	100–300 metres (330–980 ft)
	Dendrobium tetrachromum Rchb.f. 1880	Borneo	500–1,200 metres (1,600–3,900 ft)
	Dendrobium tortile Lindley 1847	Assam India, Bangladesh, Andaman Islands, Malaysia, Myanmar, Thailand, Laos and Vietnam	1,220 metres (4,000 ft)
	Dendrobium transparens Wall. 1828	western Himalayas, Bangladesh, eastern Himalayas, Assam India, Nepal, Bhutan, Sikkim, and Myanmar	500–2,100 metres (1,600–6,900 ft)
	Dendrobium unicum Seidenfadden 1970	Vietnam, Laos, Myanmar and Thailand	800–1,550 metres (2,620–5,090 ft)
	Dendrobium velutinelabrum M.A.Clem. & Cootes 2009	Philippines	
	Dendrobium vesiculosum M.A.Clem. & D.L.Jones 1996	New Guinea	500–690 metres (1,640–2,260 ft)
	Dendrobium wangliangii G.W.Hu, C.L.Long & X.H.Jin 2008	Yunnan China	1,000–2,200 metres (3,300–7,200 ft)
	Dendrobium wardianum Warner 1862	Yunnan China, Assam, eastern Himalayas, Myanmar, Thailand and Vietnam	1,000–2,000 metres (3,300–6,600 ft)
	Dendrobium wilsonii Rolfe 1906	southern China	1,000–1,300 metres (3,300–4,300 ft)
	Dendrobium xichouense S.J.Cheng & Z.Z.Tang 1984	Yunnan China	1,900 metres (6,200 ft)
