= D. roseum =

D. roseum may refer to:

- Dendrochilum roseum, a synonym for Dendrobium crepidatum, an orchid species
- Dipodium roseum, an orchid species
