= Dendrobium paxtonii =

The taxon Dendrobium paxtonii refers to the orchids:

- Dendrobium paxtonii Lindl. (1839), a synonym of Dendrobium chrysanthum
- Dendrobium paxtonii Paxton (1839), a synonym of Dendrobium fimbriatum
