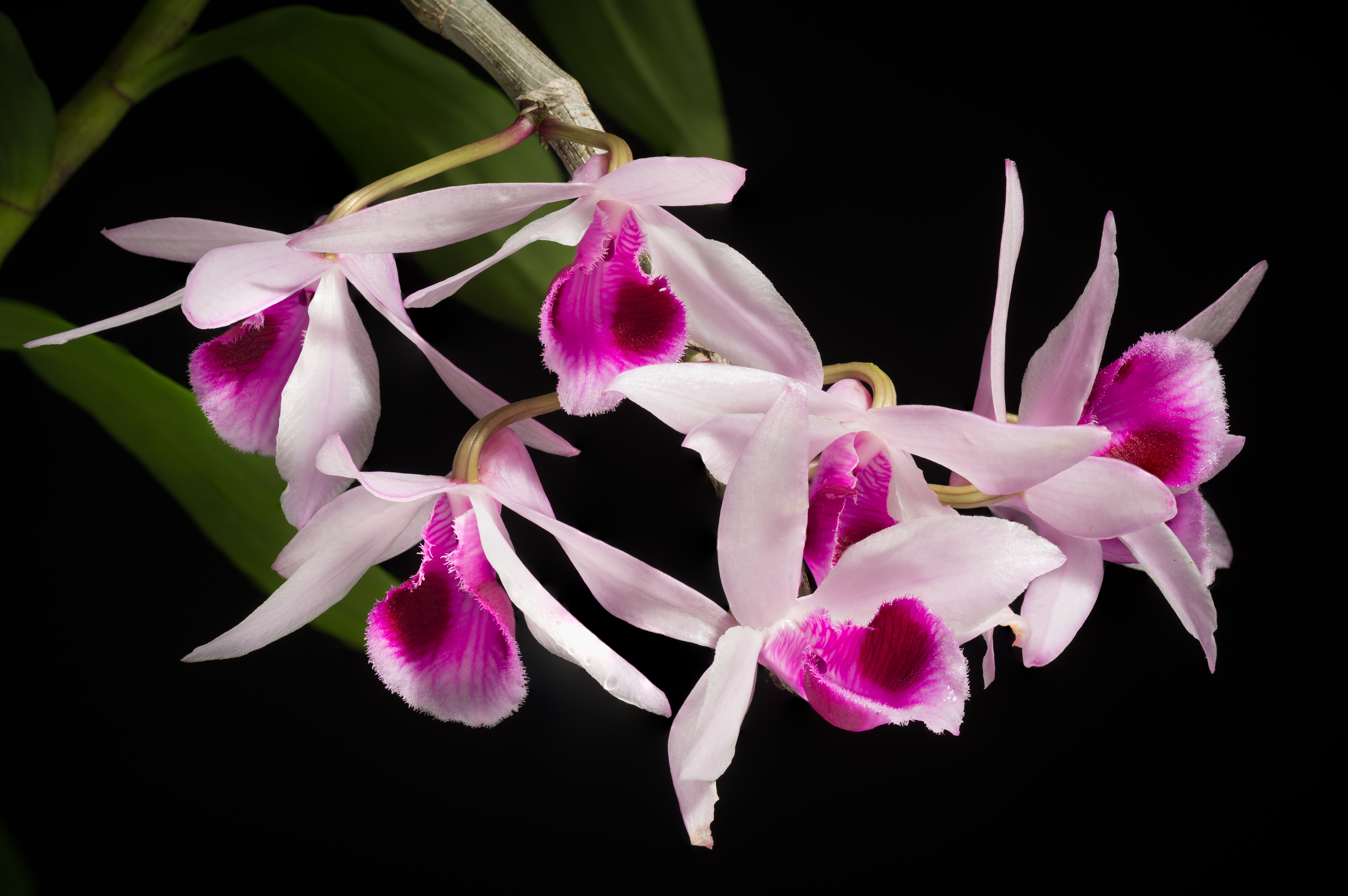

Conservation status
- CITES Appendix II (CITES)

Scientific classification
- Kingdom: Plantae
- Clade: Tracheophytes
- Clade: Angiosperms
- Clade: Monocots
- Order: Asparagales
- Family: Orchidaceae
- Subfamily: Epidendroideae
- Genus: Dendrobium
- Species: D. anosmum

Binomial name
- Dendrobium anosmum Lindl. (1845)

Synonyms
- Dendrobium superbum Rchb.f., illegitimate superfluous name presented as synonym (1861); Callista anosma (Lindl.) Kuntze (1891); Dendrobium superbum var. giganteum Rchb.f.; Epidendrum caninum Burm.f. (1768); Dendrobium macrophyllum Lindl. (1839); Dendrobium retusum Llanos (1859); Dendrobium macranthum Miq. (1859); Dendrobium superbum var. huttonii Rchb.f. (1869); Dendrobium scortechinii Hook.f. (1890); Dendrobium superbum var. dearei Rolfe (1891); Callista scortechinii (Hook.f.) Kuntze (1891); Dendrobium leucorhodum Schltr. (1912); Dendrobium caninum (Burm.f.) Merr. (1921); Dendrobium anosmum var. dearei (Rolfe) Ames & Quisumb. (1935); Dendrobium anosmum var. huttonii (Rchb.f.) Ames & Quisumb. (1935)

= Dendrobium anosmum =

Unscented Dendrobium

Species of orchid

Dendrobium anosmum, commonly known as the unscented dendrobium, is a species of epiphytic orchid with large purple flowers. It is widespread across Southeast Asia from Sri Lanka to New Guinea, including Indochina, Indonesia, the Philippines, etc. Despite its common name and scientific name, D. anosmum usually has a strong fragrance reminiscent of raspberries.

The species was first described by the English botanist John Lindley from specimens collected in the Philippines. The first varieties he discovered were scented, which he named Dendrobium macrophyllum in 1839. Six years later in 1845, he acquired unscented specimens which he named Dendrobium anosmum in reference to their perceived lack of smell. However, they have since been determined to be the same species. The newer name is used because the older name given by Lindley is invalid given that it is a homonym of the pastor's orchid (Dendrobium macrophyllum), which was described earlier in 1834 by the French botanist Achille Richard.

In the Philippines, it is locally known as sanggumay, a Tagalog portmanteau of masangsang (overpowering scent) and nakakaumay (tiresome), referring to its overpowering smell. Another local Filipino name is latigo (horsewhip), referring to its long pendulous canes which became deciduous before flowering. It is one of the most commonly cultivated species of orchids in the Philippines. In Hawaii, the species is known as hono-hono. It is also sometimes known in English as purple rain.
