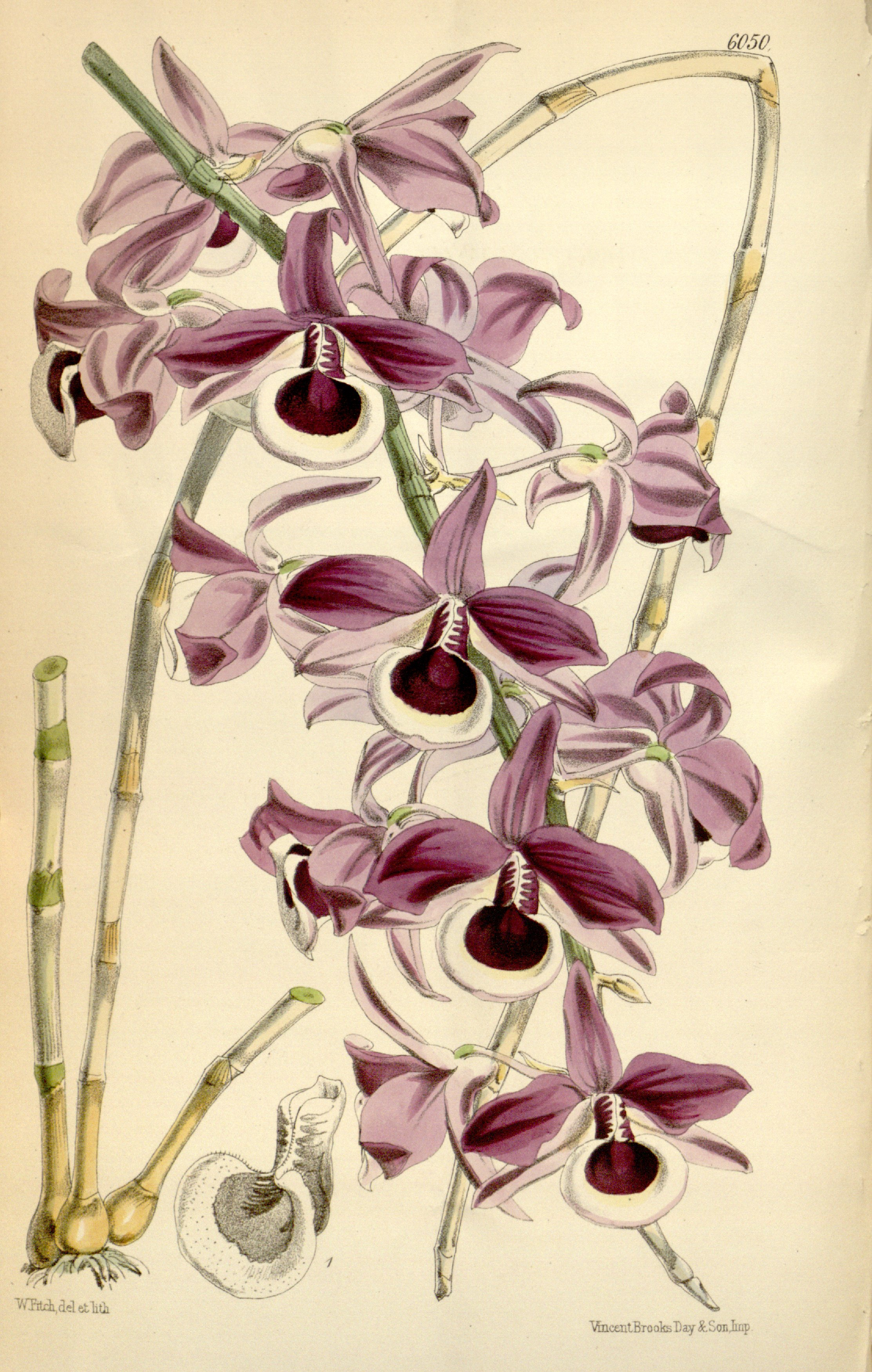
- 1872 illustration

Scientific classification
- Kingdom: Plantae
- Clade: Tracheophytes
- Clade: Angiosperms
- Clade: Monocots
- Order: Asparagales
- Family: Orchidaceae
- Subfamily: Epidendroideae
- Genus: Dendrobium
- Species: D. lituiflorum

Binomial name
- Dendrobium lituiflorum Lindl.

Synonyms
- Dendrobium hanburyanum Rchb.f.; Callista lituiflora (Lindl.) Kuntze

= Dendrobium lituiflorum =

Bent-racemed dendrobium

Species of orchid

Dendrobium lituiflorum, the bent-racemed dendrobium, is a species of orchid. It is native to southern China (Yunnan, Guangxi), the Himalayas (Arunachal Pradesh, Assam, Bangladesh) and northern Indochina (Myanmar, Thailand, Laos, Vietnam).
