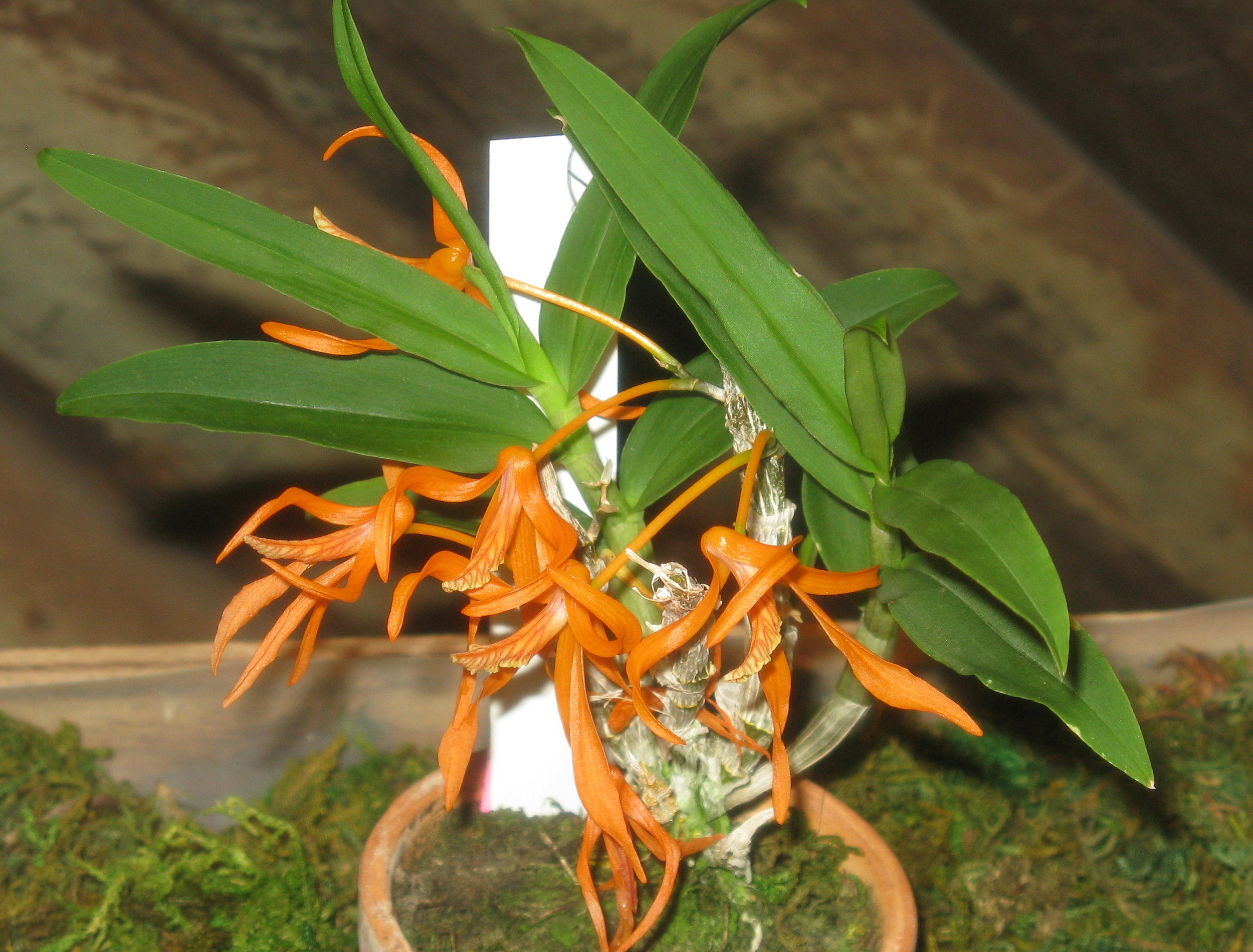

Scientific classification
- Kingdom: Plantae
- Clade: Tracheophytes
- Clade: Angiosperms
- Clade: Monocots
- Order: Asparagales
- Family: Orchidaceae
- Subfamily: Epidendroideae
- Genus: Dendrobium
- Species: D. lamyaiae

Binomial name
- Dendrobium lamyaiae Seidenf.

= Dendrobium lamyaiae =

Species of orchid

Dendrobium lamyaiae is a miniature species of orchid native to Laos and Thailand.
