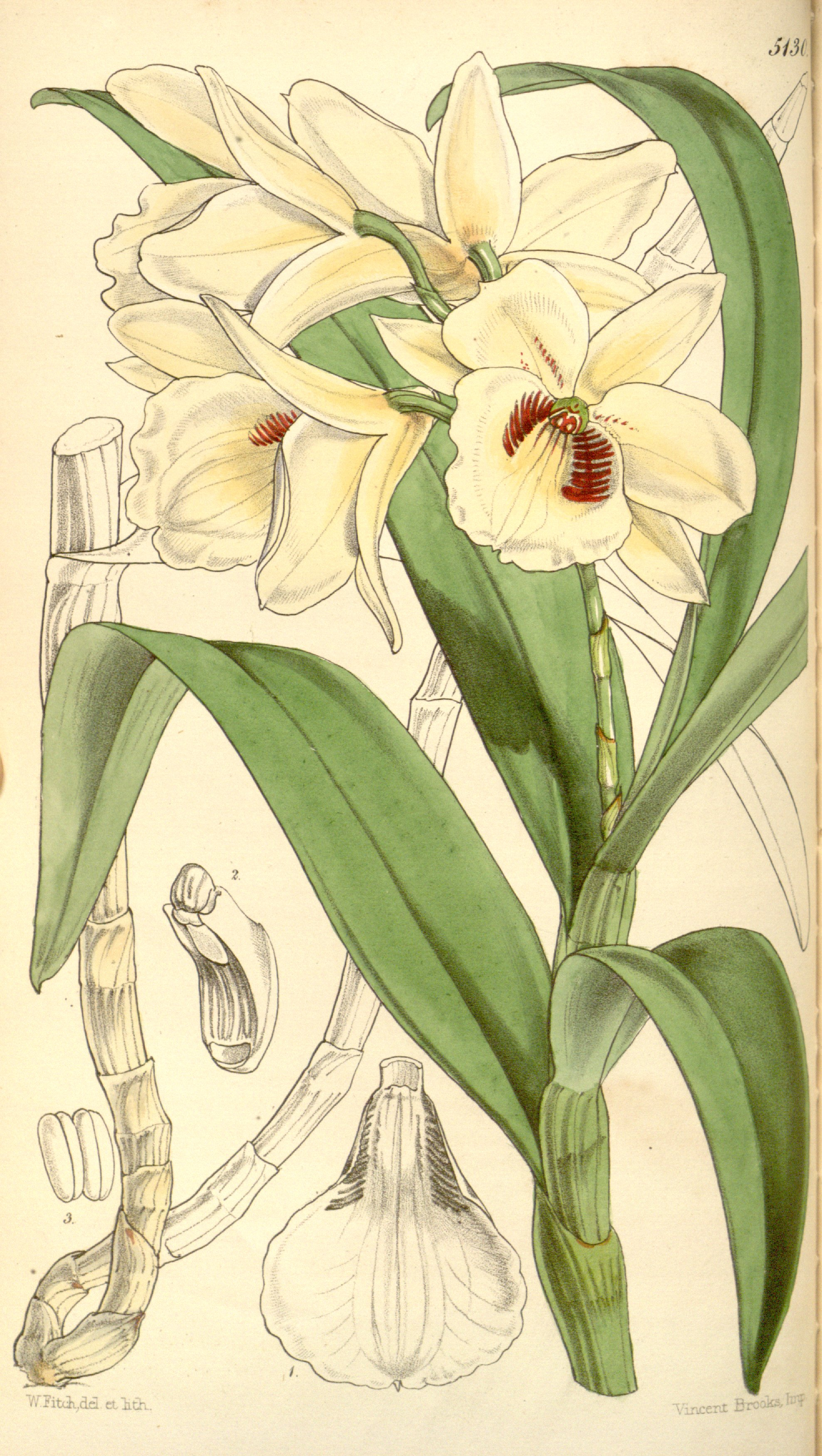
- 1858 illustration from Curtis's Botanical Magazine

Scientific classification
- Kingdom: Plantae
- Clade: Tracheophytes
- Clade: Angiosperms
- Clade: Monocots
- Order: Asparagales
- Family: Orchidaceae
- Subfamily: Epidendroideae
- Genus: Dendrobium
- Species: D. albosanguineum

Binomial name
- Dendrobium albosanguineum Lindl. & Paxton (1851)

Synonyms
- Callista albosanguinea (Lindl. & Paxton) Kuntze (1891)

= Dendrobium albosanguineum =

White and blood-red dendrobium

Species of orchid

Dendrobium albosanguineum (white and blood-red dendrobium) is a species of orchid, native to Thailand and Myanmar.
