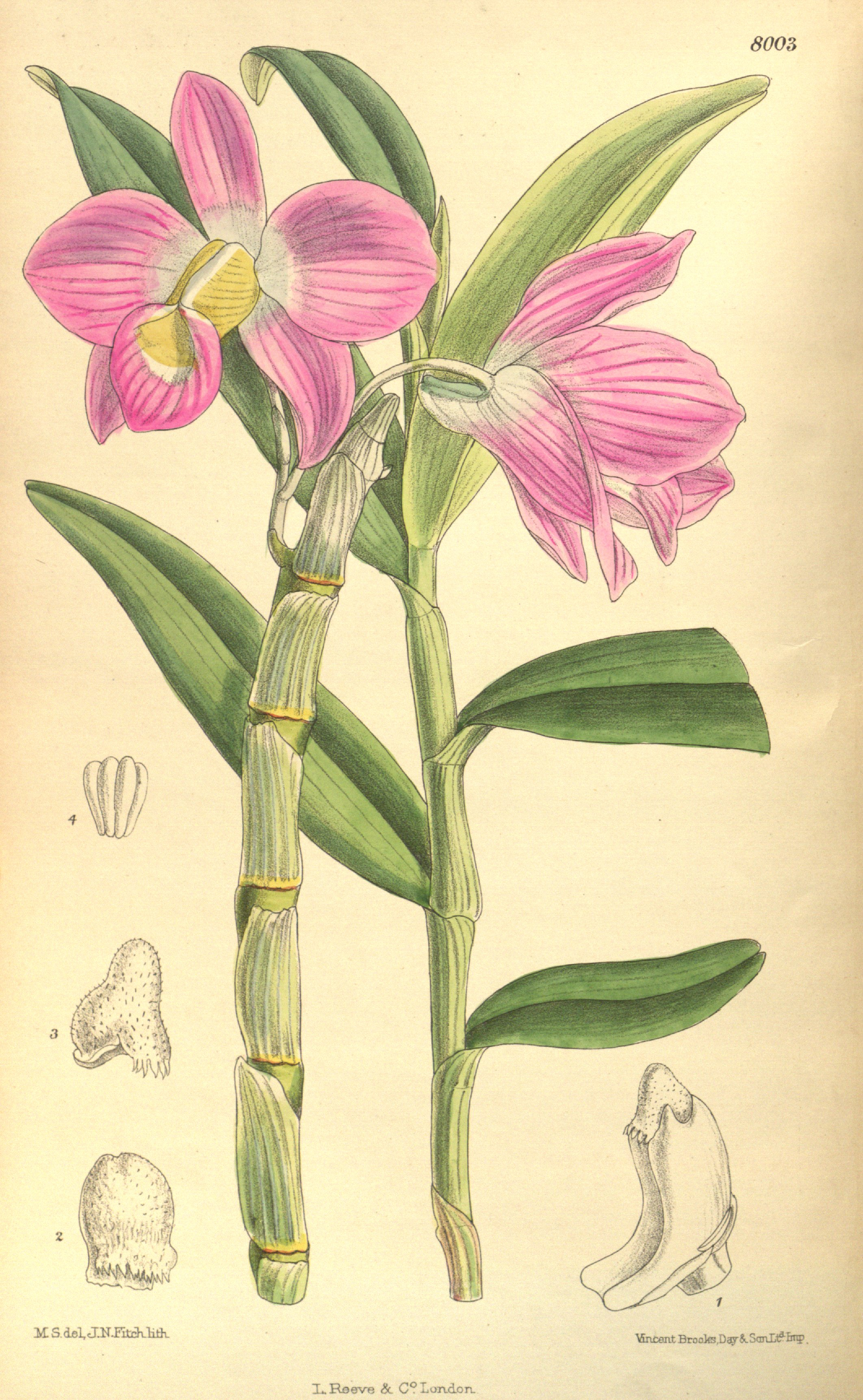
- 1905 illustration

Scientific classification
- Kingdom: Plantae
- Clade: Tracheophytes
- Clade: Angiosperms
- Clade: Monocots
- Order: Asparagales
- Family: Orchidaceae
- Subfamily: Epidendroideae
- Genus: Dendrobium
- Species: D. regium

Binomial name
- Dendrobium regium Prain

= Dendrobium regium =

Species of orchid

Dendrobium regium is a species of orchid endemic to India. It has been found in Chhattisgarh, Jharkhand, Orissa, and Andhra Pradesh.
