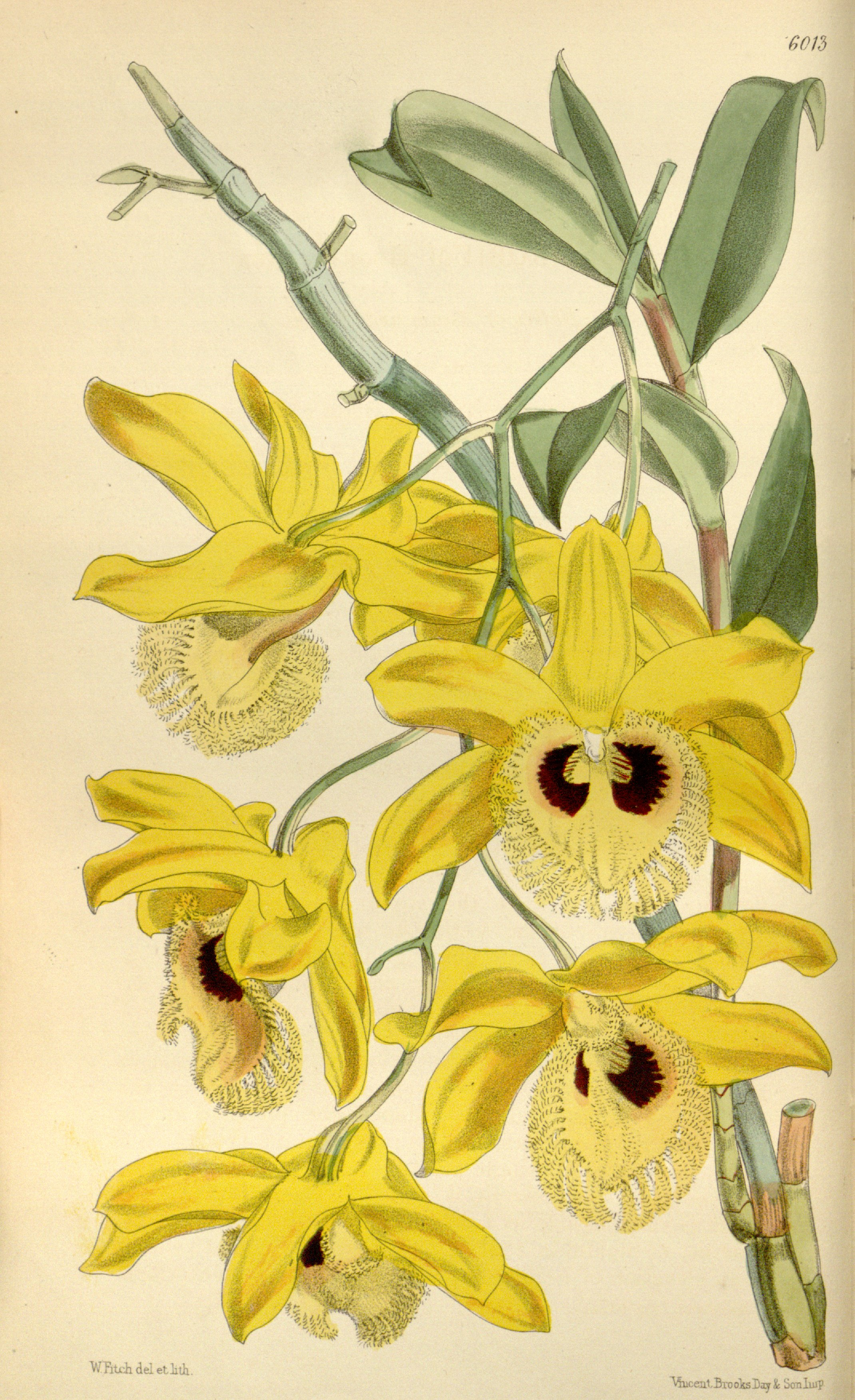
- 1872 illustration

Conservation status
- CITES Appendix II (CITES)

Scientific classification
- Kingdom: Plantae
- Clade: Tracheophytes
- Clade: Angiosperms
- Clade: Monocots
- Order: Asparagales
- Family: Orchidaceae
- Subfamily: Epidendroideae
- Genus: Dendrobium
- Species: D. hookerianum

Binomial name
- Dendrobium hookerianum Lindl.

Synonyms
- Dendrobium fimbriatum var. bimaculosum Tang & F.T.Wang; Dendrobium chrysotis Rchb.f.; Callista hookeriana (Lindl.) Kuntze

= Dendrobium hookerianum =

Species of orchid

Dendrobium hookerianum is a species of orchid, native to Asia, in the genus Dendrobium.

== Distribution ==
The plant is native to the eastern Himalayas region.

It is found in Tibet, Bhutan, Bangladesh, Myanmar, Nepal, northeastern India in Arunachal Pradesh and Assam, and China in Yunnan.
