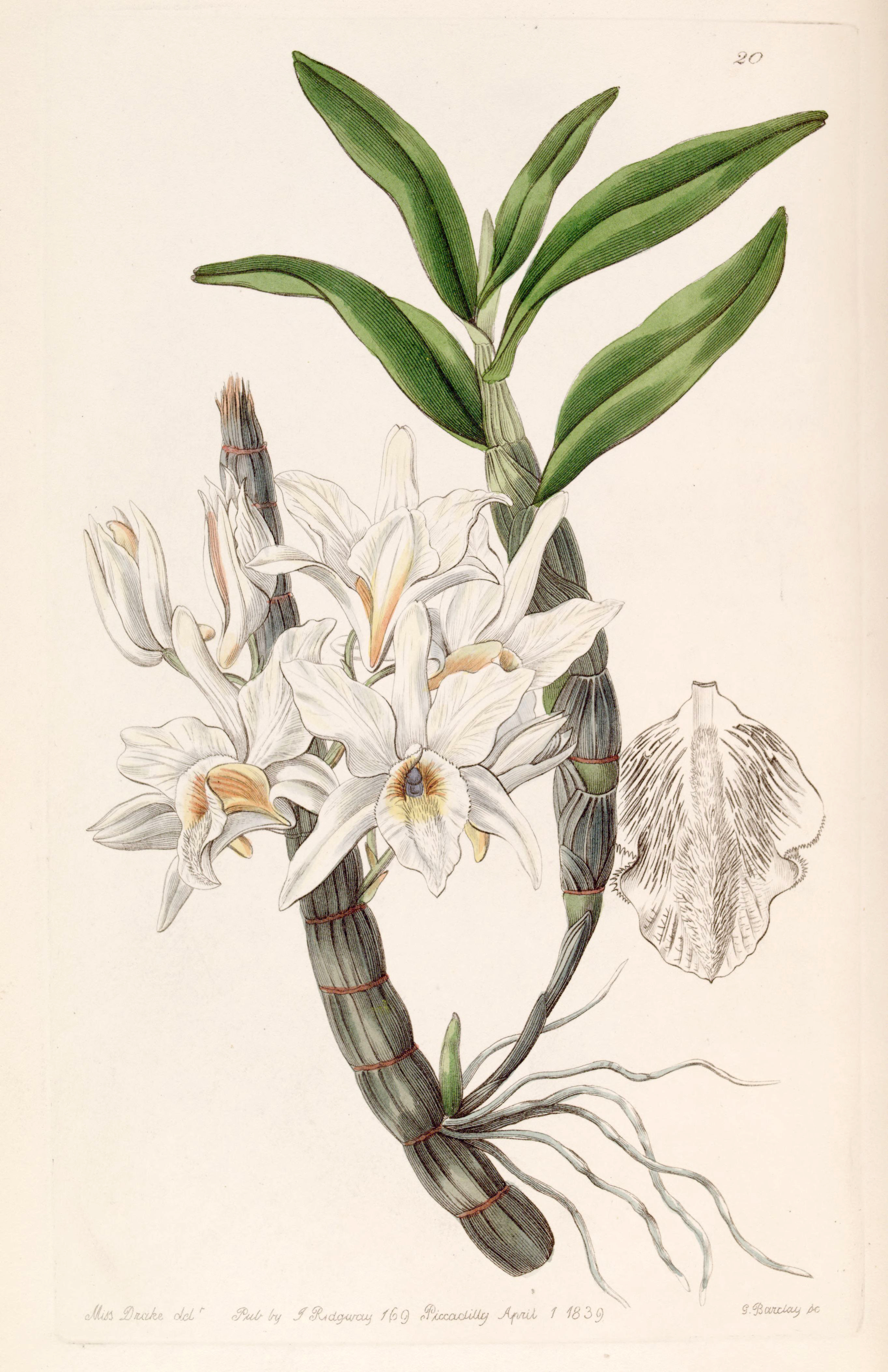
- Illustration by Sarah Drake

Scientific classification
- Kingdom: Plantae
- Clade: Embryophytes
- Clade: Tracheophytes
- Clade: Angiosperms
- Clade: Monocots
- Order: Asparagales
- Family: Orchidaceae
- Subfamily: Epidendroideae
- Genus: Dendrobium
- Species: D. heterocarpum

Binomial name
- Dendrobium heterocarpum Wall. ex Lindl.

Synonyms
- Callista heterocarpa (Wall. ex Lindl.) Kuntze; Callista aurea (Lindl.) Kuntze; Dendrobium atractodes Ridl.; Dendrobium aureum Lindl.; Dendrobium aureum var. pallidum Lindl.; Dendrobium citrinum W.Bull; Dendrobium heterocarpum var. henshalii Hook.; Dendrobium minahassae Kraenzl.

= Dendrobium heterocarpum =

Jian dao chun shi hu

Species of orchid

Dendrobium heterocarpum, commonly known as 尖刀唇石斛 (jian dao chun shi hu), is a species of orchid that is native to the China, Nepal, Bhutan, Assam, the Indian subcontinent and Southeast Asia.
