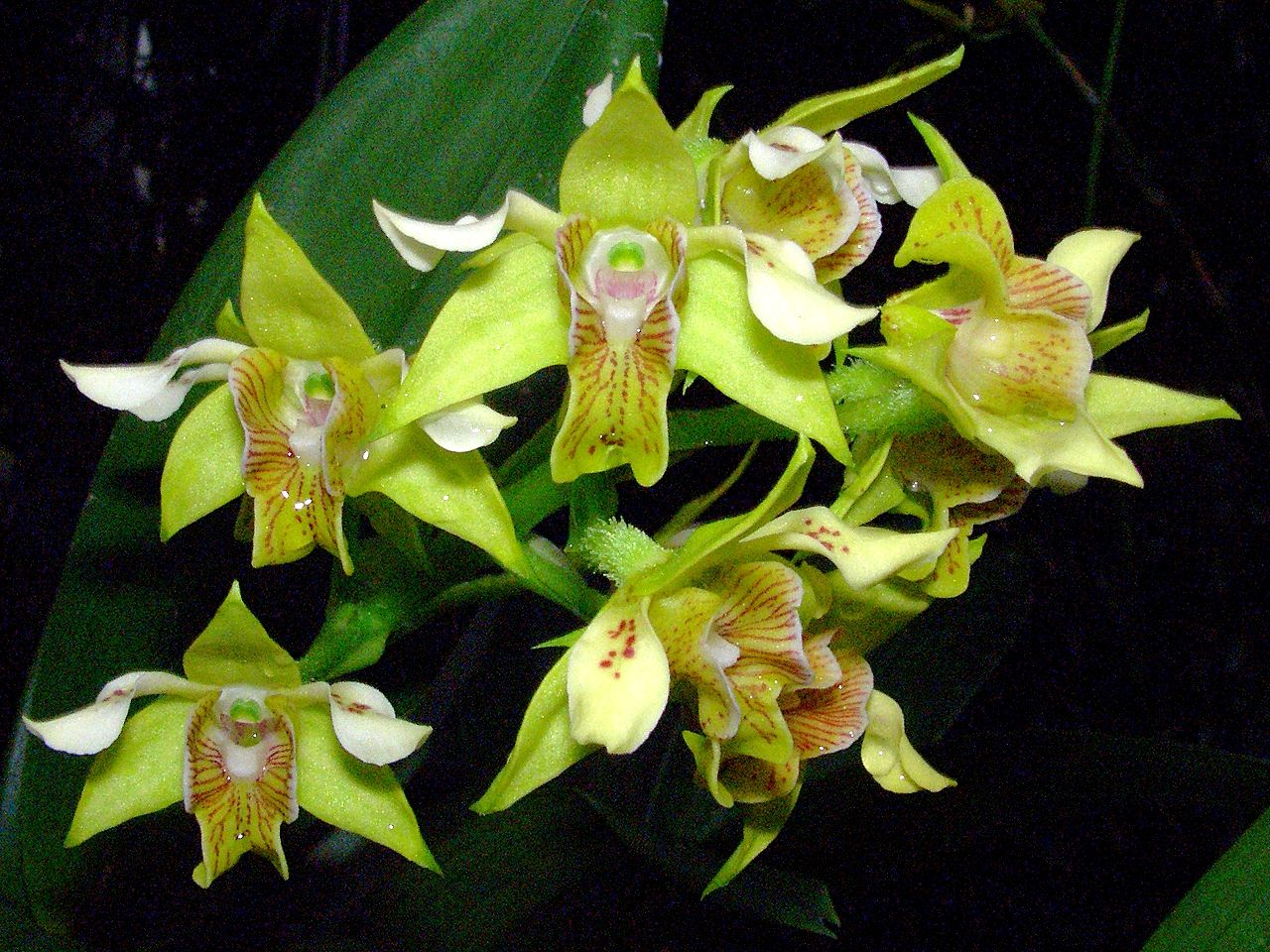

Conservation status
- Least Concern (IUCN 3.1)

Scientific classification
- Kingdom: Plantae
- Clade: Tracheophytes
- Clade: Angiosperms
- Clade: Monocots
- Order: Asparagales
- Family: Orchidaceae
- Subfamily: Epidendroideae
- Genus: Dendrobium
- Species: D. macrophyllum

Binomial name
- Dendrobium macrophyllum A.Rich.

Synonyms
- Callista macrophylla (A.Rich.) Kuntze; Latourorchis macrophylla (A.Rich.) Brieger; Sayeria macrophylla (A.Rich.) Rauschert; Dendrobium veitchianum Lindl.; Dendrobium ferox Hassk.; Dendrobium sarcostemma Teijsm. & Binn. ex Miq., invalid; Dendrobium macrophyllum var. veitchianum (Lindl.) Hook.f.; Dendrobium macrophyllum var. huttonii H.J.Veitch; Dendrobium gordonii S.Moore ex Baker; Callista gordonii (S.Moore ex Baker) Kuntze; Callista veitchiana (Lindl.) Kuntze; Dendrobium lucae F.Muell. ex Kraenzl. in H.G.A.Engler, illegitimate; Dendrobium psyche Kraenzl. in H.G.A.Engler; Dendrobium musciferum Schltr.; Latourea muscifera (Schltr.) Brieger in F.R.R.Schlechter; Latourorchis muscifera (Schltr.) Brieger in F.R.R.Schlechter; Sayeria muscifera (Schltr.) Rauschert; Dendrobium setigerum Ames ex M.A.Clem.; Sayeria psyche (Kraenzl.) M.A.Clem. & D.L.Jones; Dendrobium ternatense J.J.Sm.; Dendrobium tomohonense Kraenzl. in H.G.A.Engler

= Dendrobium macrophyllum =

Species of plant

Dendrobium macrophyllum, commonly known as the large-leaved dendrobium or pastor's orchid, is a species of Orchid.

It is native to Indonesia, Philippines, New Guinea, and some islands of the western Pacific (Solomon Islands, Fiji, New Caledonia, Samoa, the Caroline Islands).

== Varieties ==
Three varieties of the species are recognized:

1. Dendrobium macrophyllum var. macrophyllum – most of species range
2. Dendrobium macrophyllum var. subvelutinum J.J.Sm. – New Guinea
3. Dendrobium macrophyllum var. ternatense (J.J.Sm.) P.O'Byrne & J.J.Wood – Sabah, Sulawesi, Ternate
