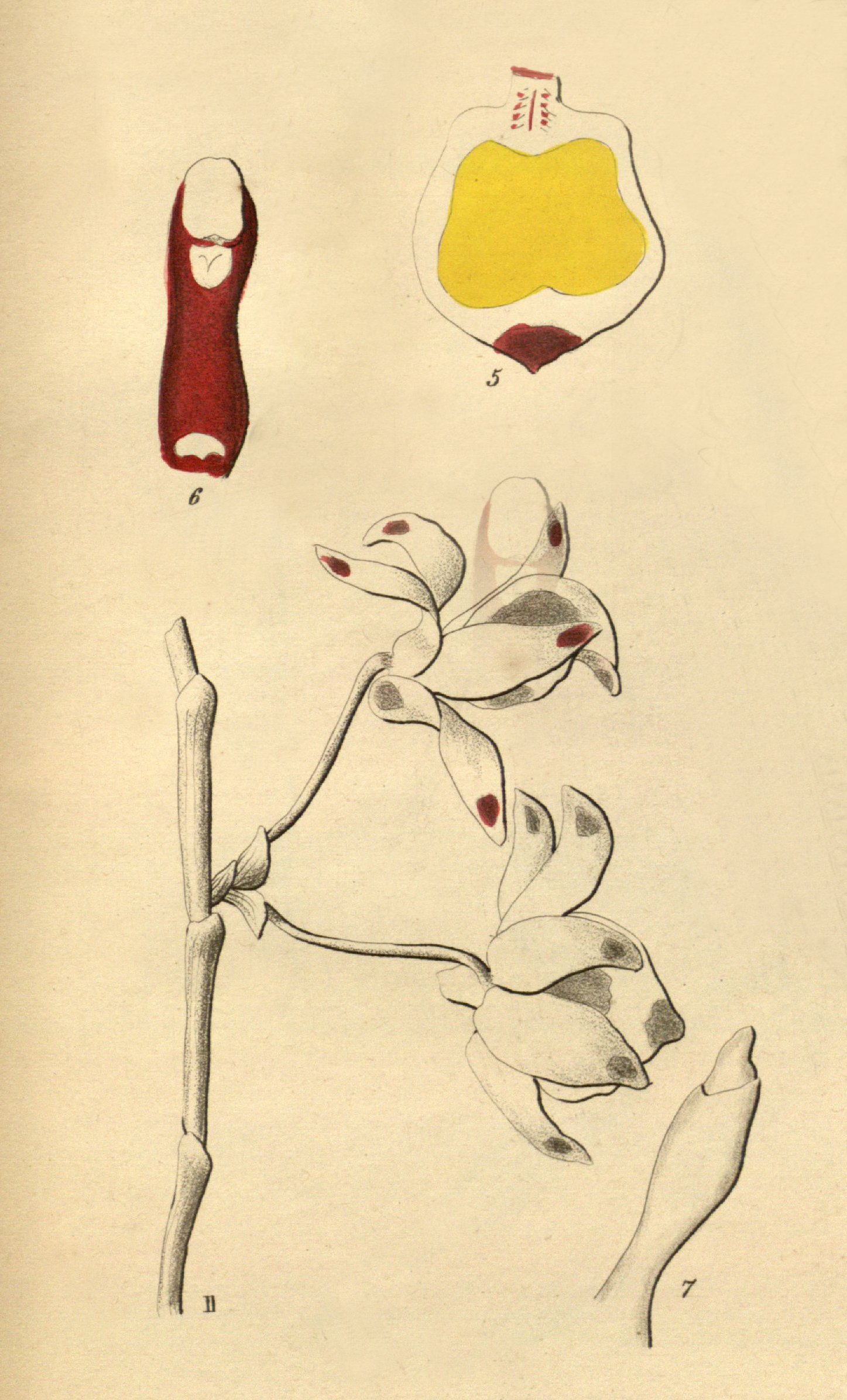
- 1874 illustration

Scientific classification
- Kingdom: Plantae
- Clade: Tracheophytes
- Clade: Angiosperms
- Clade: Monocots
- Order: Asparagales
- Family: Orchidaceae
- Subfamily: Epidendroideae
- Genus: Dendrobium
- Species: D. gratiosissimum

Binomial name
- Dendrobium gratiosissimum Rchb.f.

Synonyms
- Dendrobium bullerianum Bateman; Dendrobium boxallii Rchb.f.; Callista boxaleii (Rchb.f.) Kuntze; Callista gratiosissima (Rchb.f.) Kuntze

= Dendrobium gratiosissimum =

Very graceful dendrobium

Species of orchid

Dendrobium gratiosissimum, the very graceful dendrobium, is a species of orchid. It is native to Thailand, Vietnam, Laos, Myanmar, Yunnan, and Assam.
