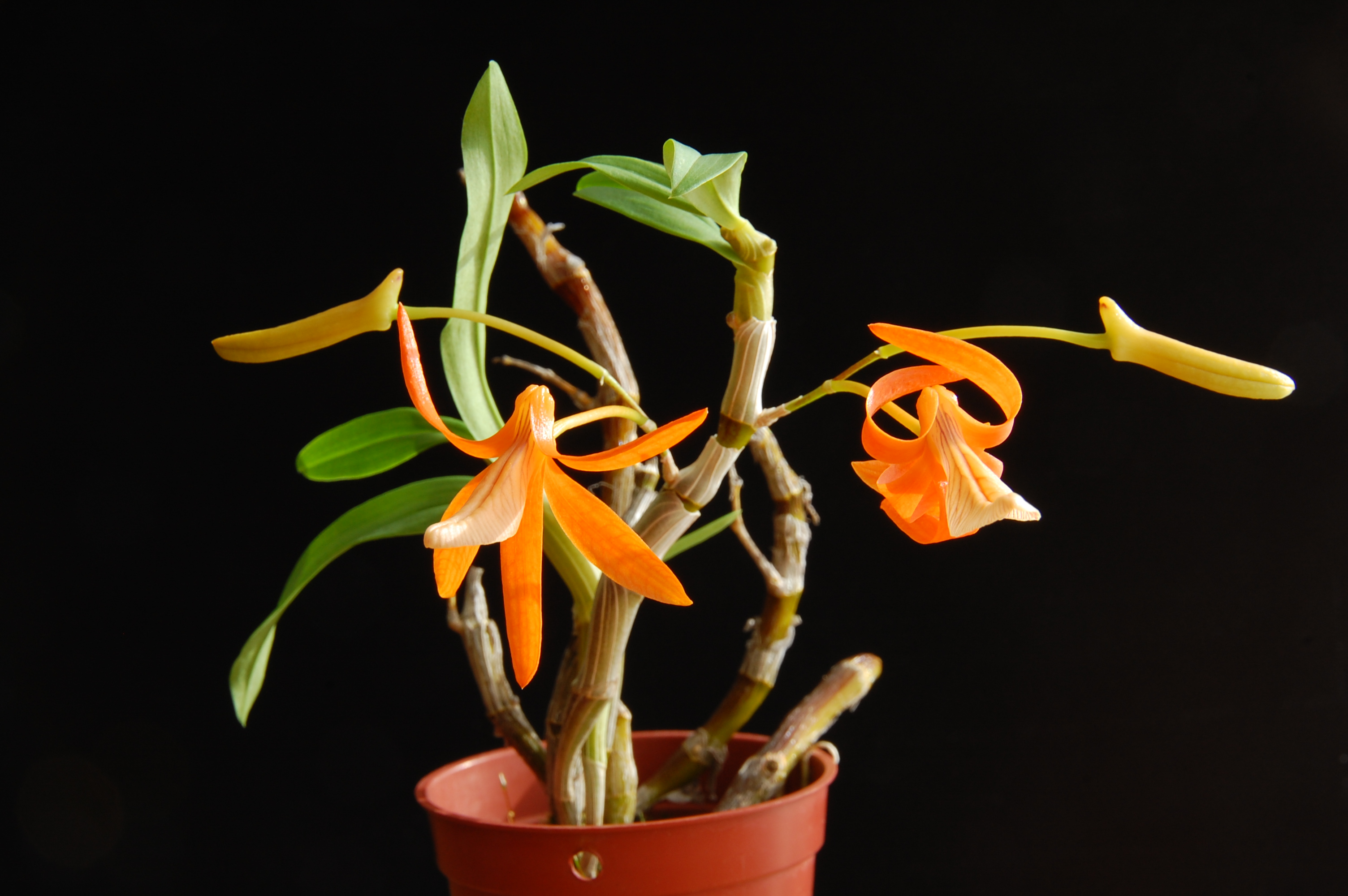

Scientific classification
- Kingdom: Plantae
- Clade: Tracheophytes
- Clade: Angiosperms
- Clade: Monocots
- Order: Asparagales
- Family: Orchidaceae
- Subfamily: Epidendroideae
- Genus: Dendrobium
- Species: D. unicum

Binomial name
- Dendrobium unicum Seidenf.

= Dendrobium unicum =

Unique dendrobium

Species of orchid

Dendrobium unicum is a species of orchid, commonly known as the unique dendrobium endemic to Southeast Asia, in Thailand, Laos, and Vietnam. It was first described by Seidenfadden in 1970.

== Cultivation ==
Dendrobium unicum requires a cool climate with a temperature of 40 to 95 °F (4 to 35 °C)
