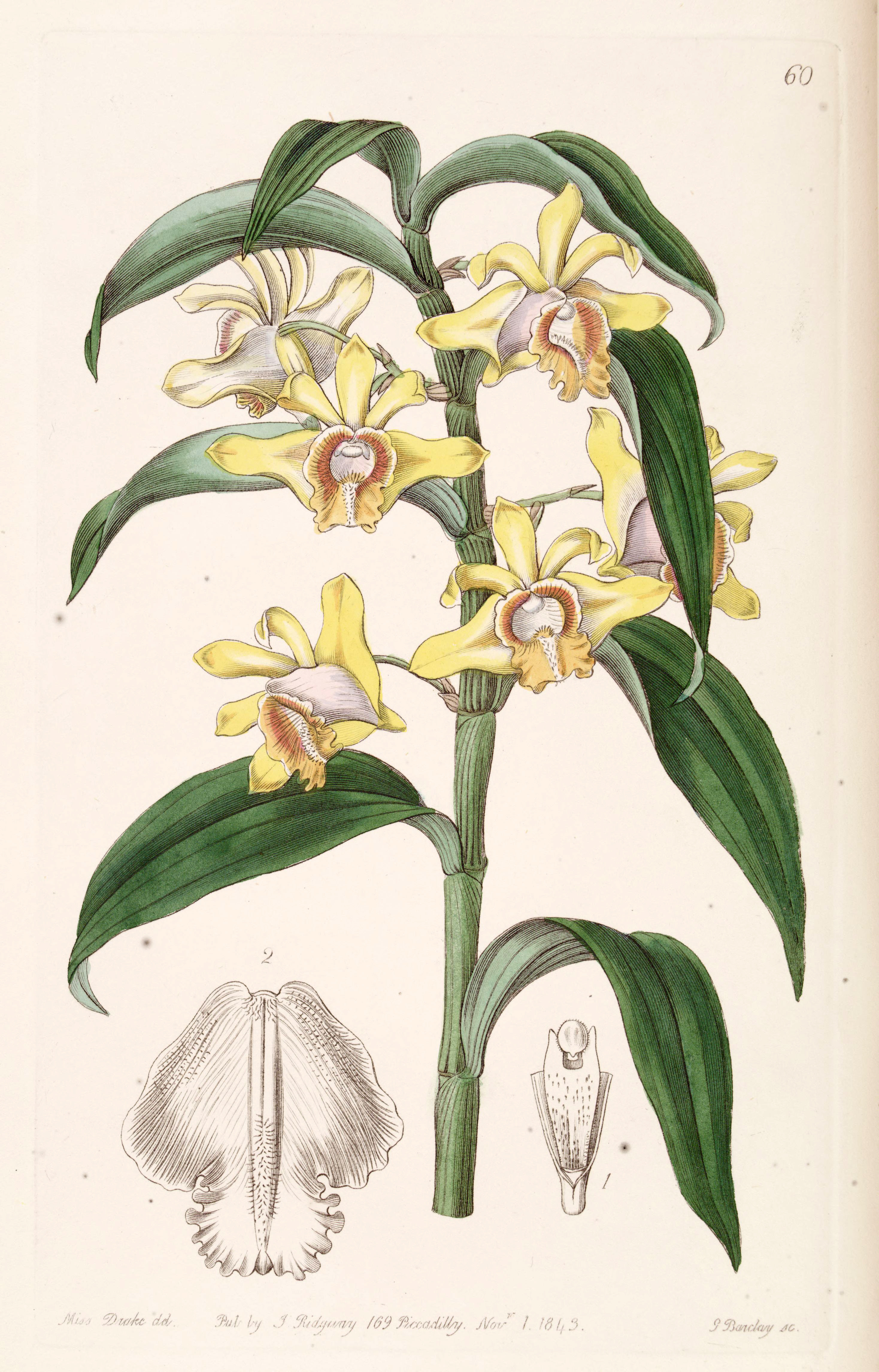
- 1843 illustration

Scientific classification
- Kingdom: Plantae
- Clade: Embryophytes
- Clade: Tracheophytes
- Clade: Angiosperms
- Clade: Monocots
- Order: Asparagales
- Family: Orchidaceae
- Subfamily: Epidendroideae
- Genus: Dendrobium
- Species: D. ruckeri

Binomial name
- Dendrobium ruckeri Lindl.

Synonyms
- Dendrobium ramosum Lindl. 1830, illegitimate homonym, not (Ruiz & Pav.) Pers. 1807; Callista ramosa Kuntze; Callista ruckeri (Lindl.) Kuntze

= Dendrobium ruckeri =

Species of orchid

Dendrobium ruckeri is a species of flowering plant in the family Orchidaceae. It is native to the eastern Himalayas (Bhutan, Assam, Arunachal Pradesh and Myanmar).
