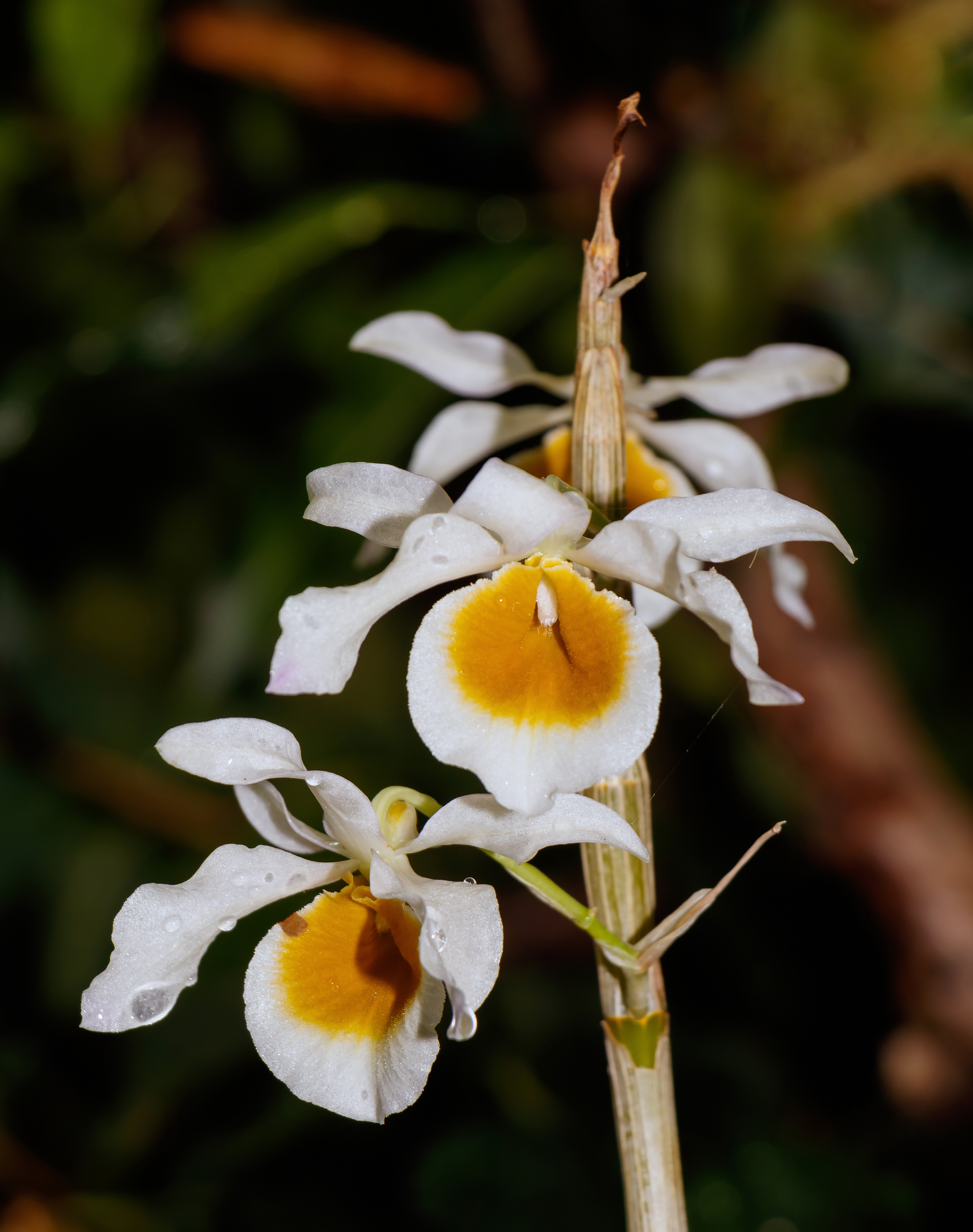

Scientific classification
- Kingdom: Plantae
- Clade: Tracheophytes
- Clade: Angiosperms
- Clade: Monocots
- Order: Asparagales
- Family: Orchidaceae
- Subfamily: Epidendroideae
- Genus: Dendrobium
- Species: D. crystallinum

Binomial name
- Dendrobium crystallinum Rchb.f. (1868)

Synonyms
- Callista crystallina (Rchb.f.) Kuntze (1891); Dendrobium crystallinum var. hainanense S.J. Cheng & C.Z. Tang (1986)

= Dendrobium crystallinum =

Shiny crystal Dendrobium

Species of orchid

Dendrobium crystallinum (shiny crystal dendrobium) is a species of orchid. It is native to Southeast Asia, Hainan and Yunnan in China, and Manipur in India.
