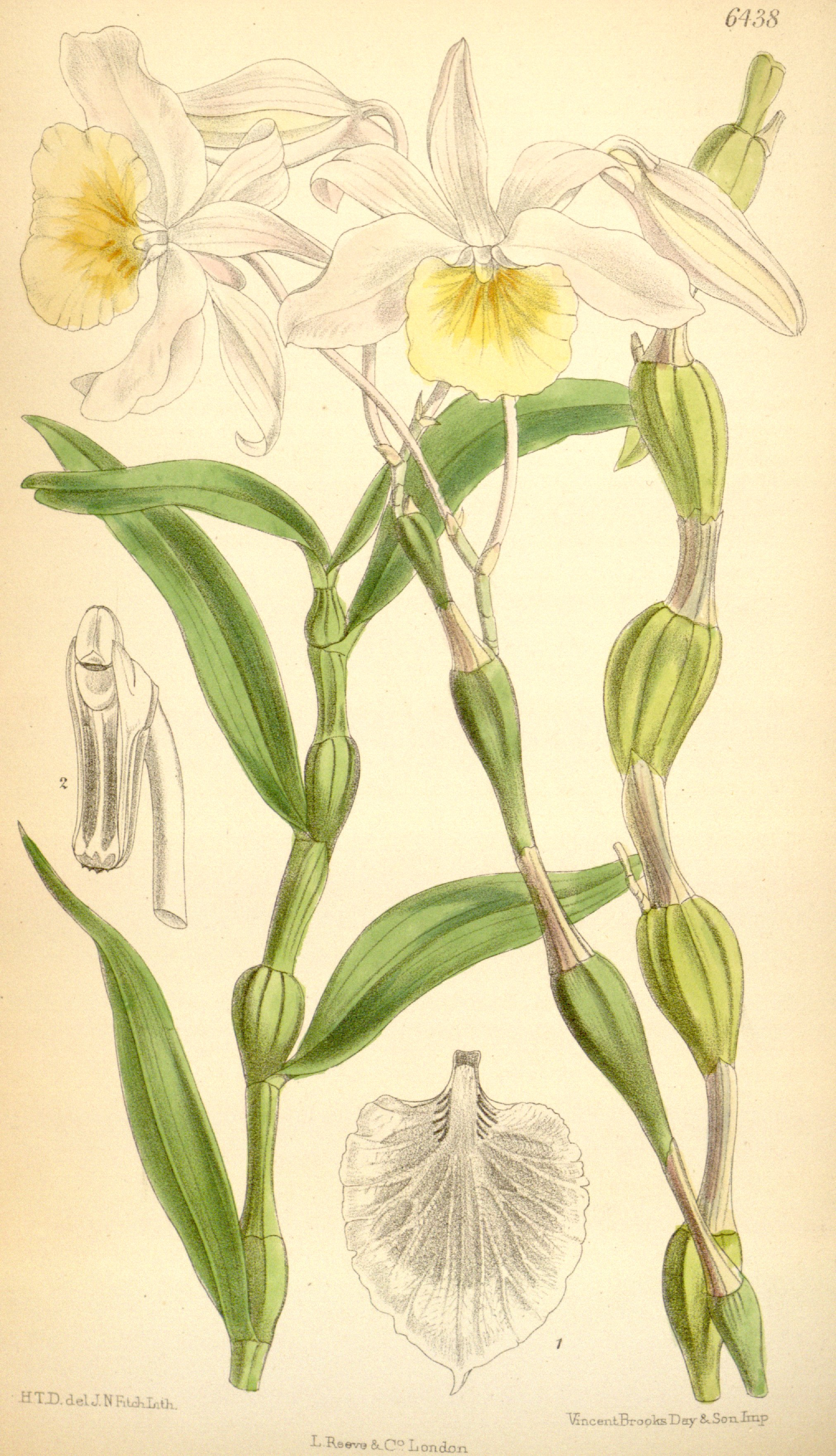
- 1879 illustration

Scientific classification
- Kingdom: Plantae
- Clade: Embryophytes
- Clade: Tracheophytes
- Clade: Angiosperms
- Clade: Monocots
- Order: Asparagales
- Family: Orchidaceae
- Subfamily: Epidendroideae
- Genus: Dendrobium
- Species: D. findlayanum

Binomial name
- Dendrobium findlayanum C.S.P. Parish & Rchb.f. (1874)

Synonyms
- Callista findlayana (C.S.P. Parish & Rchb.f.) Kuntze (1891)

= Dendrobium findlayanum =

Findlay's dendrobium

Species of orchid

Dendrobium findlayanum, Findlay's dendrobium, is a species of orchid. It is native to Indochina (Vietnam, Thailand, Laos, Myanmar) and to the Yunnan region of China.

The epithet is sometimes spelled findleyanum. The species was named for James Findlay.
