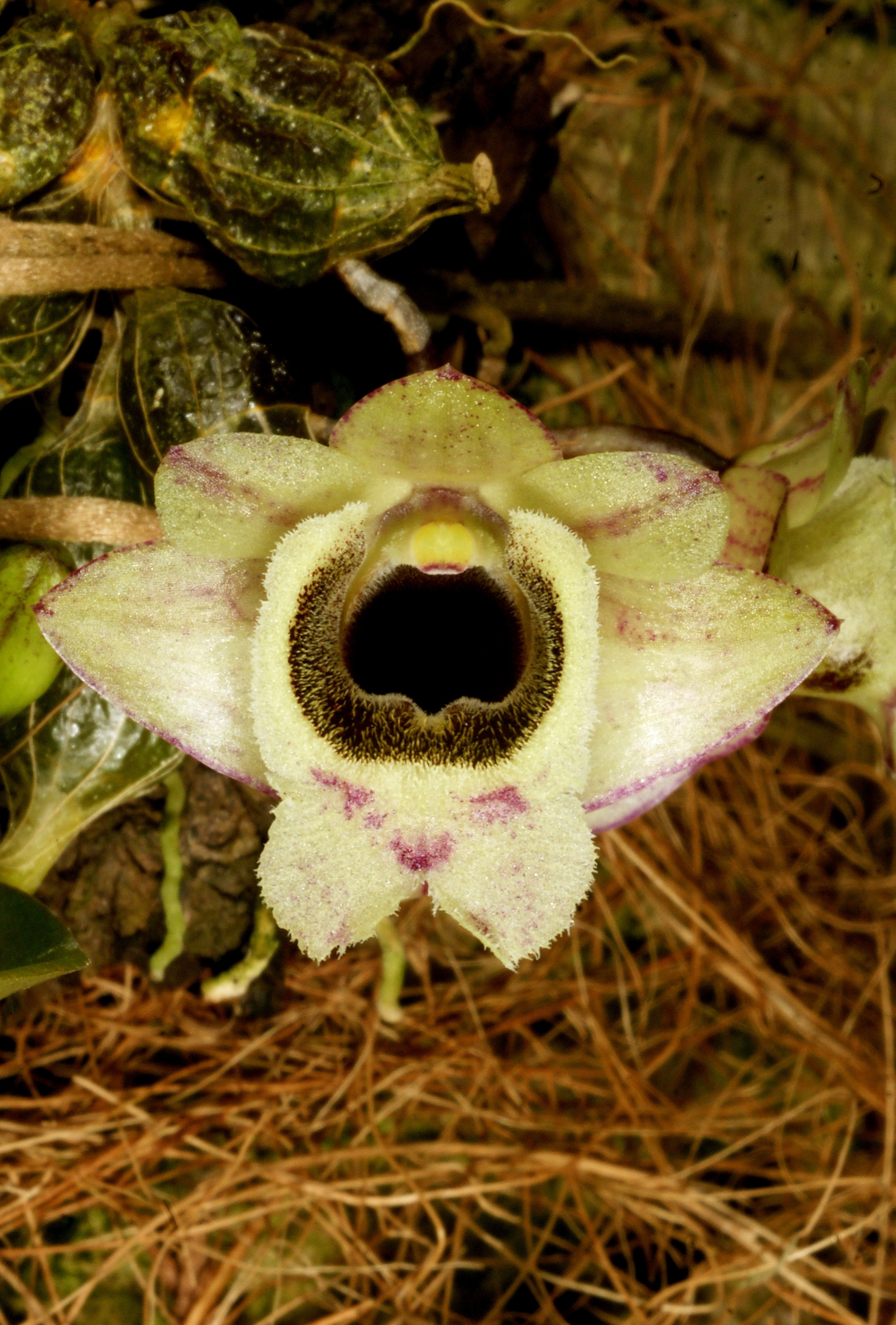

Scientific classification
- Kingdom: Plantae
- Clade: Tracheophytes
- Clade: Angiosperms
- Clade: Monocots
- Order: Asparagales
- Family: Orchidaceae
- Subfamily: Epidendroideae
- Genus: Dendrobium
- Species: D. hekouense

Binomial name
- Dendrobium hekouense Z.J.Liu & L.J.Chen

= Dendrobium hekouense =

Species of orchid

Dendrobium hekouense is a miniature species of orchid.

== Distribution and habitat ==
The primary habitat of Dendrobium hekouense is evergreen forests located in subtropical highlands. These forests are covered with dense fog between April and October as a result of monsoon weather.

It was first described in Yunnan, China and has also been found in Northern Vietnam.

== Characteristics ==
Dendrobium hekouense forms a single-flower inflorescence that arises from a leafless pseudobulb.

In its natural habitat this orchid flowers between August and September, during a period that coincides with annual rain. It is typically found on the ground-facing side of tree trunks, in a position that prevents rainwater from falling into the flower.
