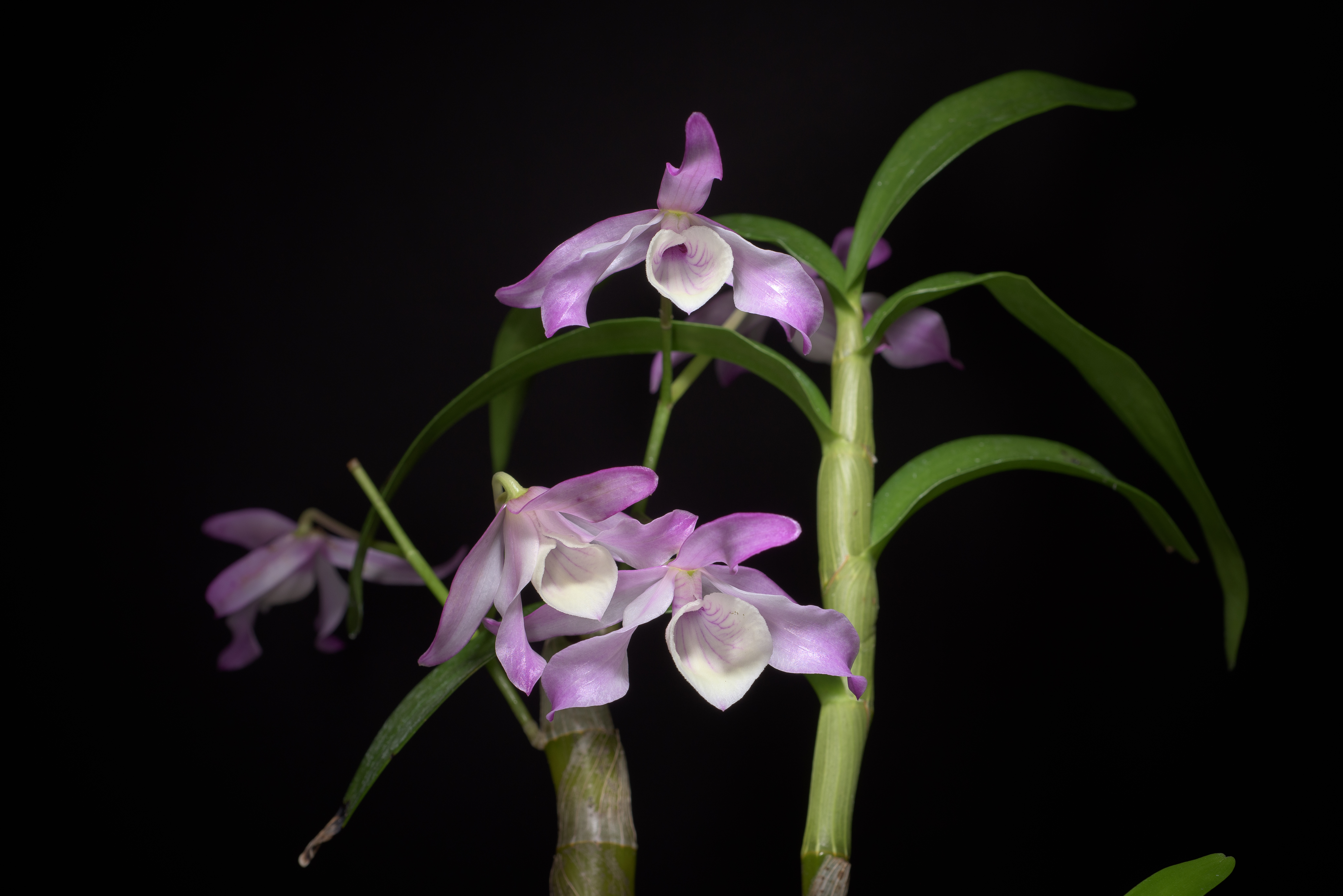

Scientific classification
- Kingdom: Plantae
- Clade: Tracheophytes
- Clade: Angiosperms
- Clade: Monocots
- Order: Asparagales
- Family: Orchidaceae
- Subfamily: Epidendroideae
- Genus: Dendrobium
- Species: D. tortilerS

Binomial name
- Dendrobium tortilerS Lindl.

Synonyms
- Dendrobium dartoisianum De Wild.; Dendrobium haniffii Ridl. ex Burkill

= Dendrobium tortile =

Twisted dendrobium

Species of orchid

Dendrobium tortile is a species of orchid, commonsly known as the twisted dendrobium. It is native across Southeast Asia, and in Bangladesh, Assam state of India, and the Andaman Islands.
