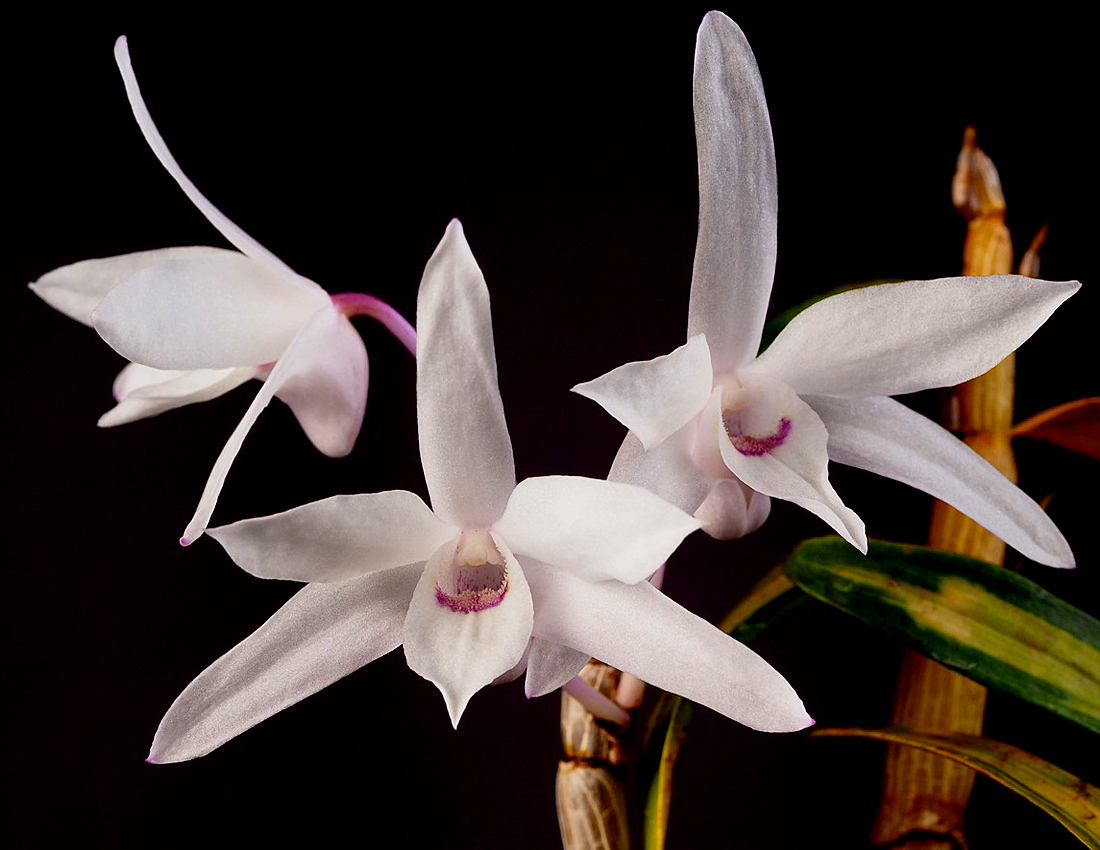

Scientific classification
- Kingdom: Plantae
- Clade: Tracheophytes
- Clade: Angiosperms
- Clade: Monocots
- Order: Asparagales
- Family: Orchidaceae
- Subfamily: Epidendroideae
- Genus: Dendrobium
- Species: D. moniliforme

Binomial name
- Dendrobium moniliforme (L.) Sw.

Synonyms
- Epidendrum moniliforme L. (basionym); Epidendrum monile Thunb.; Limodorum monile (Thunb.) Thunb.; Callista moniliformis (L.) Kuntze; Dendrobium monile Kraenzl.; Epidendrum moniliferum Panz.; Dendrobium japonicum (Blume) Lindl.; Ormostema albiflora Raf.; Dendrobium castum Bateman ex Rchb.f.; Callista japonica (Blume) Kuntze; Callista stricklandiana (Rchb.f.) Kuntze; Dendrobium heishanense Hayata; Dendrobium taiwanianum S.S.Ying; Dendrobium candidum Wall. ex Lindl; Dendrobium spathaceum Lindl.; Callista candida (Wall. ex Lindl.) Kuntze; Callista spathacea (Lindl.) Kuntze; Dendrobium yunnanense Finet; Dendrobium zonatum Rolfe; Dendrobium wilsoni Rolfe; Dendrobium heishanense Hayata; Dendrobium kosepangii C.L.Tso; Dendrobium kwangtungense C.L.Tso; Dendrobium nienkui C.L.Tso; Dendrobium crispulum Kimura & Migo; Dendrobium taiwanianu S.S.Ying; Dendrobium tosaense var. chingshuishanianum S.S.Ying; Dendrobium moniliforme var. malipoense L.J.Chen & Z.J.Liu

= Dendrobium moniliforme =

Species of orchid from Asia

Dendrobium moniliforme (Chinese: 石斛, romanized: shíhú, Japanese: セッコク, romanized: sekkoku, Korean: 석곡, romanized: seokgok ) is a species of orchid. It is native to Japan, Korea, China, the Himalayas, and northern Indochina.

Dendrobium moniliforme is the type species for the genus Dendrobium.

In 17th century Japan, royalty used it to perfume clothing.
