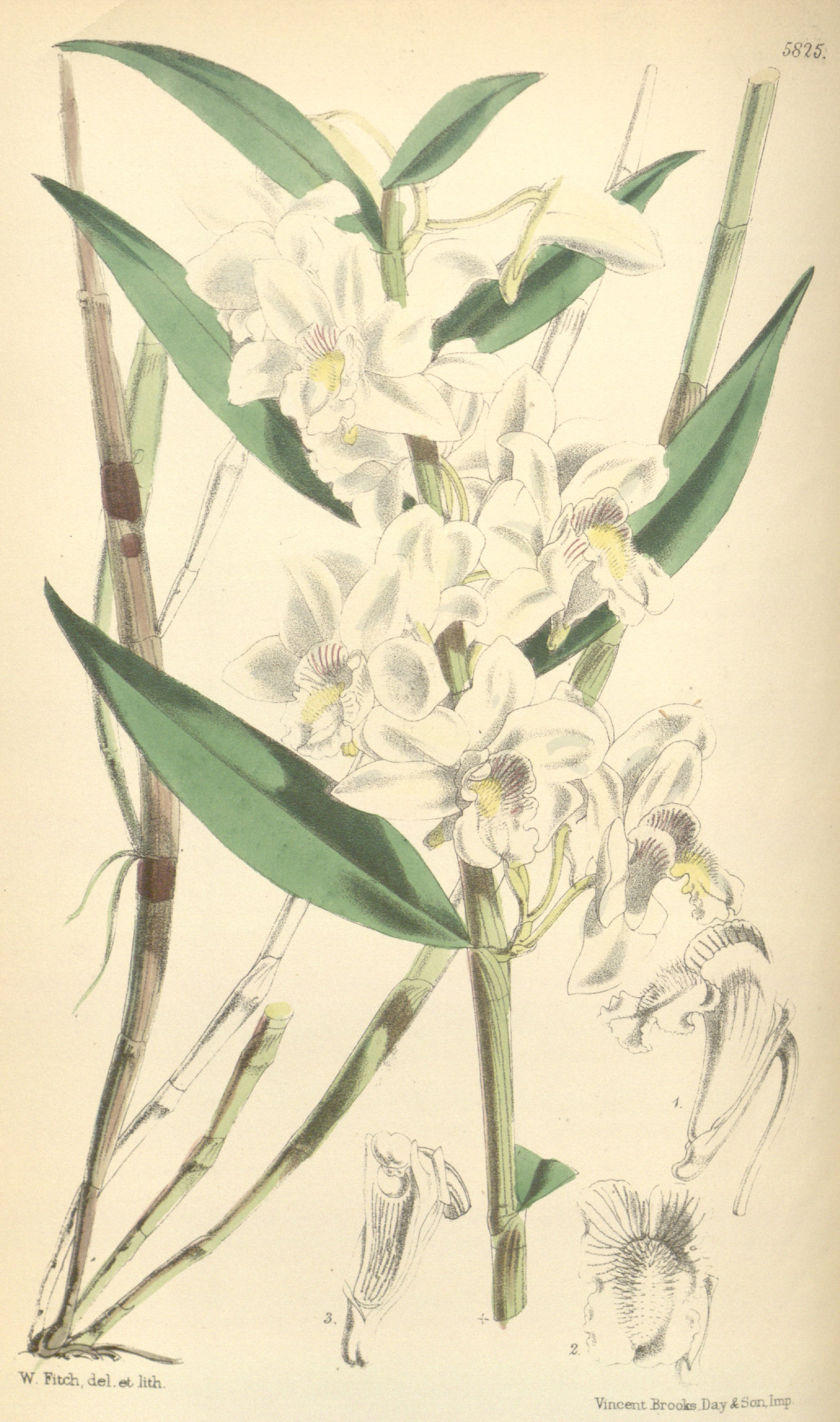
- 1869 illustration

Scientific classification
- Kingdom: Plantae
- Clade: Tracheophytes
- Clade: Angiosperms
- Clade: Monocots
- Order: Asparagales
- Family: Orchidaceae
- Subfamily: Epidendroideae
- Genus: Dendrobium
- Species: D. lasioglossum

Binomial name
- Dendrobium lasioglossum Rchb.f.

Synonyms
- Callista lasioglossa (Rchb.f.) Kuntze

= Dendrobium lasioglossum =

Species of orchid

Dendrobium lasioglossum is a species of orchid endemic to New Guinea.
