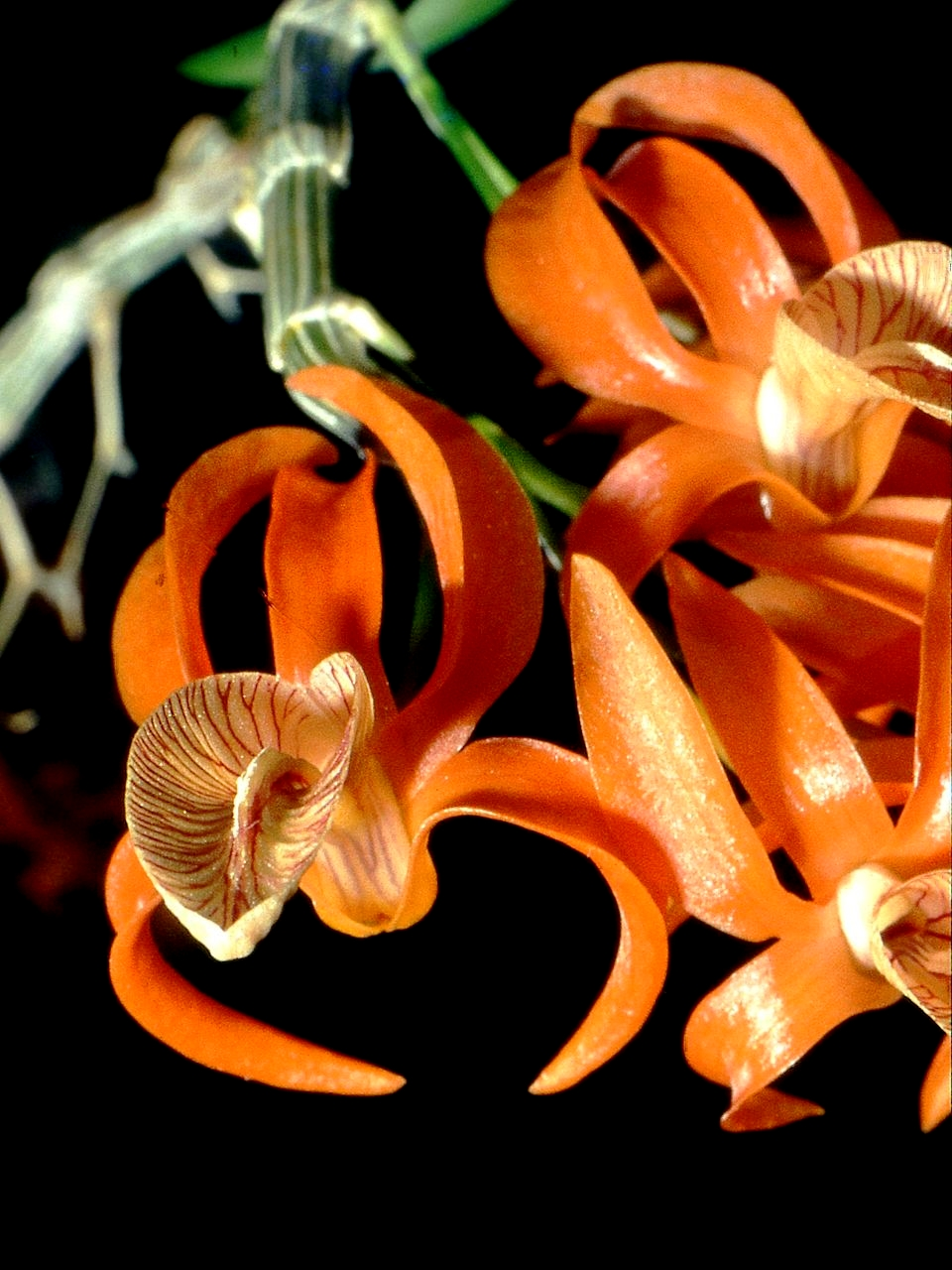

Scientific classification
- Kingdom: Plantae
- Clade: Tracheophytes
- Clade: Angiosperms
- Clade: Monocots
- Order: Asparagales
- Family: Orchidaceae
- Subfamily: Epidendroideae
- Genus: Dendrobium
- Species: D. inversum

Binomial name
- Dendrobium inversum J.Bradshaw ex Cortauld

Synonyms
- Callista arachnites Kuntze; Dendrobium arachnites Rchb.f. nom. illeg.; Dendrobium dickasonii L.O.Williams; Dendrobium inversum Kraenzl. ex A.D.Hawkes nom. illeg.; Dendrobium seidenfadenii Senghas & Bockemühl nom. superfl.

= Dendrobium inversum =

Species of orchid

Dendrobium inversum is a species of orchid that is native to Myanmar (Burma) and the Assam region of northeastern India. It was first formally described in 1895 in The Gardeners' Chronicle by Sydney Cortauld from an unpublished description by John Bradshaw.
