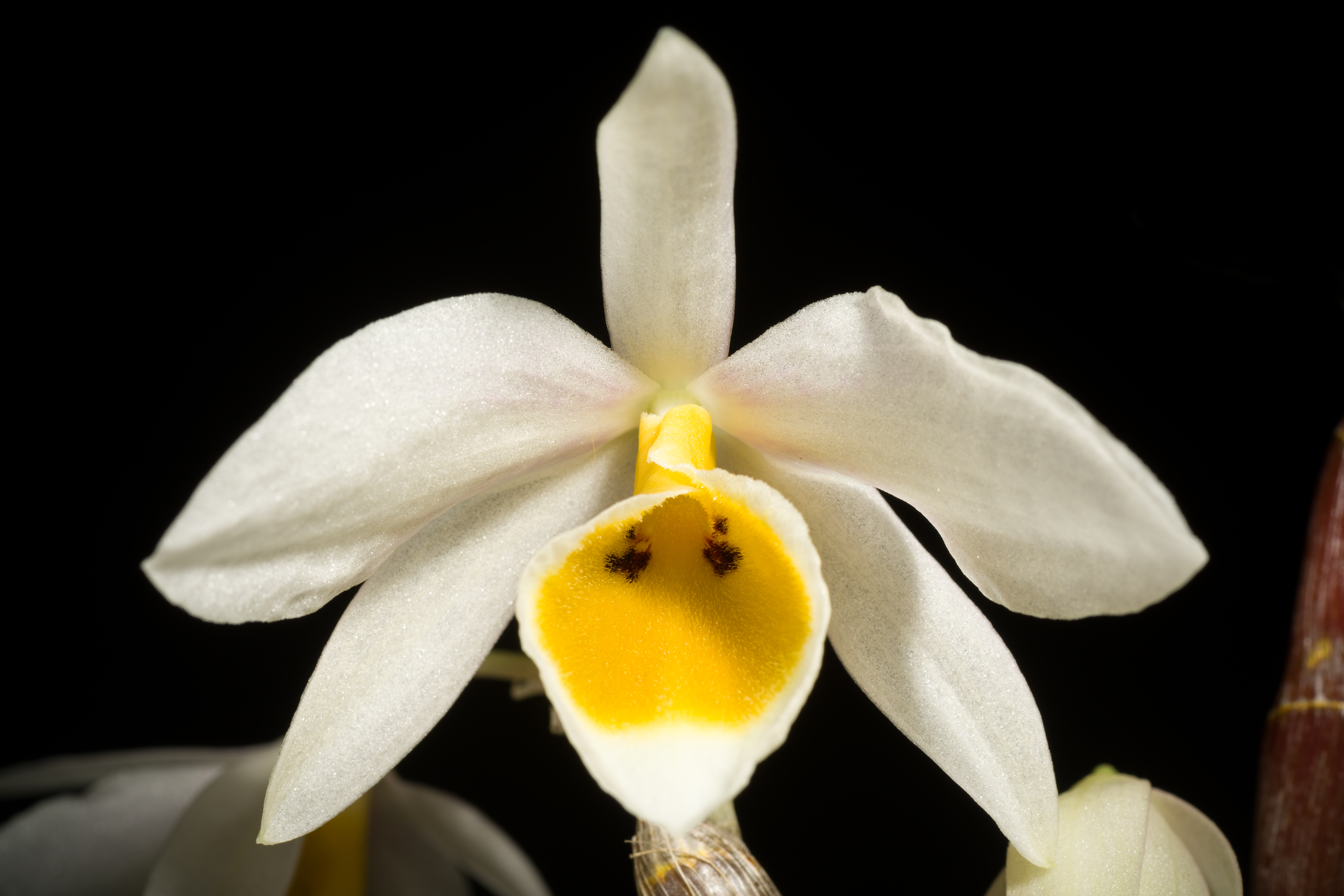
- Flower of D. bensoniae

Conservation status
- Least Concern (IUCN 3.1)

Scientific classification
- Kingdom: Plantae
- Clade: Tracheophytes
- Clade: Angiosperms
- Clade: Monocots
- Order: Asparagales
- Family: Orchidaceae
- Subfamily: Epidendroideae
- Genus: Dendrobium
- Species: D. bensoniae

Binomial name
- Dendrobium bensoniae Rchb.f.

Synonyms
- Callista bensoniae (Rchb.f.) Kuntze; Dendrobium bensoniae var. aurantiacum Rchb.f.

= Dendrobium bensoniae =

Species of orchid

Dendrobium bensoniae is a species of orchid native to Asia. It was described by German botanist Heinrich Gustav Reichenbach in 1867 and is now popular as an ornamental plant.

== Distribution and habitat ==
Dendrobium bensoniae is native to northeastern India (Assam, Mizoram, and Manipur), Bangladesh, mainland Myanmar, and Thailand. It grows as an epiphyte on tree trunks in moist lowland and submontane forests.

== Description ==
D. bensoniae is an upright, deciduous plant. The stems measure 3.5–7.5 cm (1.4–3.0 in) long and 4–8 mm (0.16–0.31 in) thick and each bear two to five leaves. The flowers measure approximately 4.6 cm (1.8 in) across and are mostly white in colour, with two dark purple blotches surrounded by yellow on the inside of the labellum.
