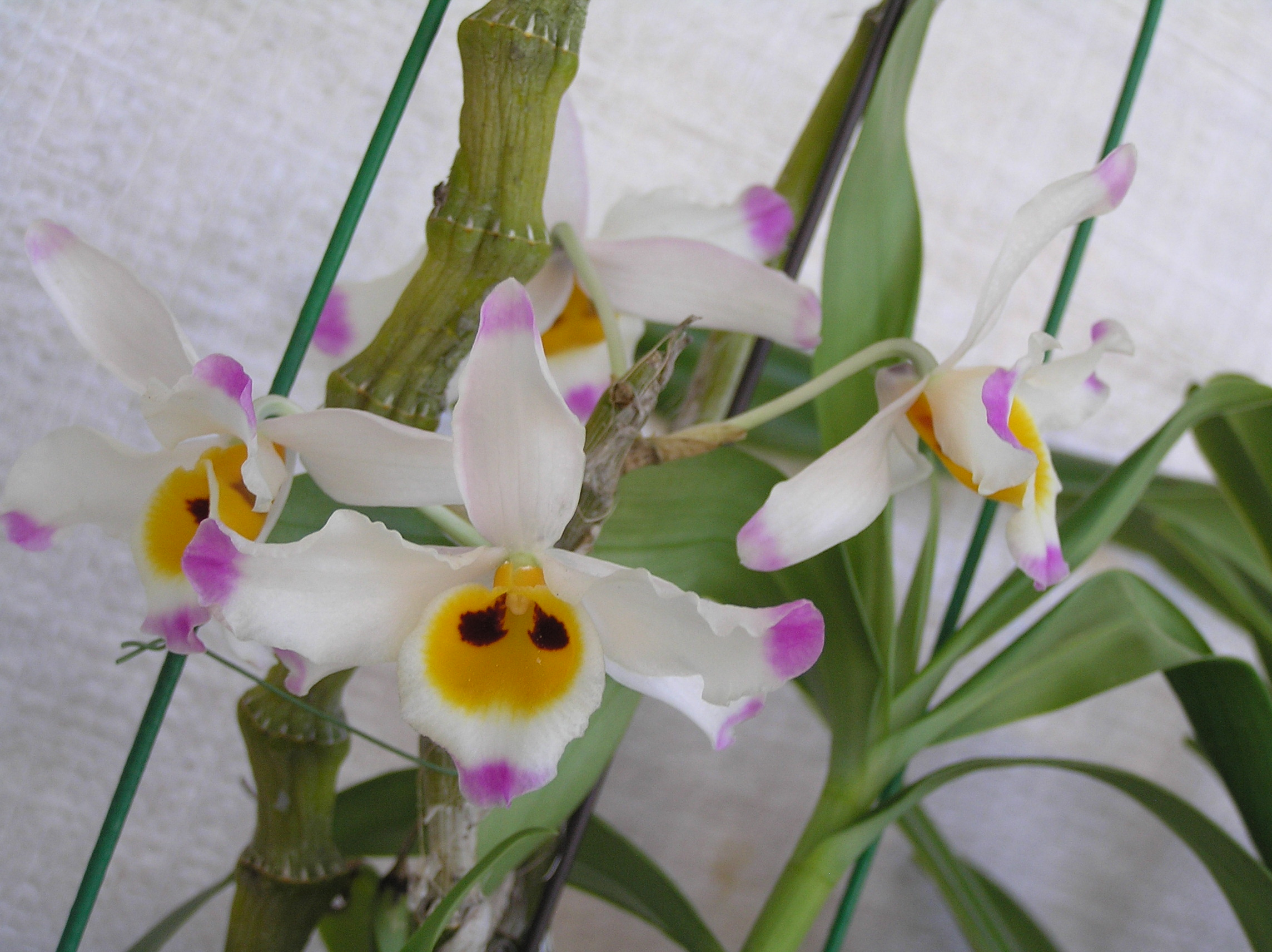

Scientific classification
- Kingdom: Plantae
- Clade: Embryophytes
- Clade: Tracheophytes
- Clade: Angiosperms
- Clade: Monocots
- Order: Asparagales
- Family: Orchidaceae
- Subfamily: Epidendroideae
- Genus: Dendrobium
- Species: D. wardianum

Binomial name
- Dendrobium wardianum Warner 1862

= Dendrobium wardianum =

Species of orchid

Dendrobium wardianum is a species of ornamental orchid.

== Distribution and habitat ==
Dendrobium wardianum is found in Yunnan, Myanmar, Bangladesh, Vietnam and Thailand.
