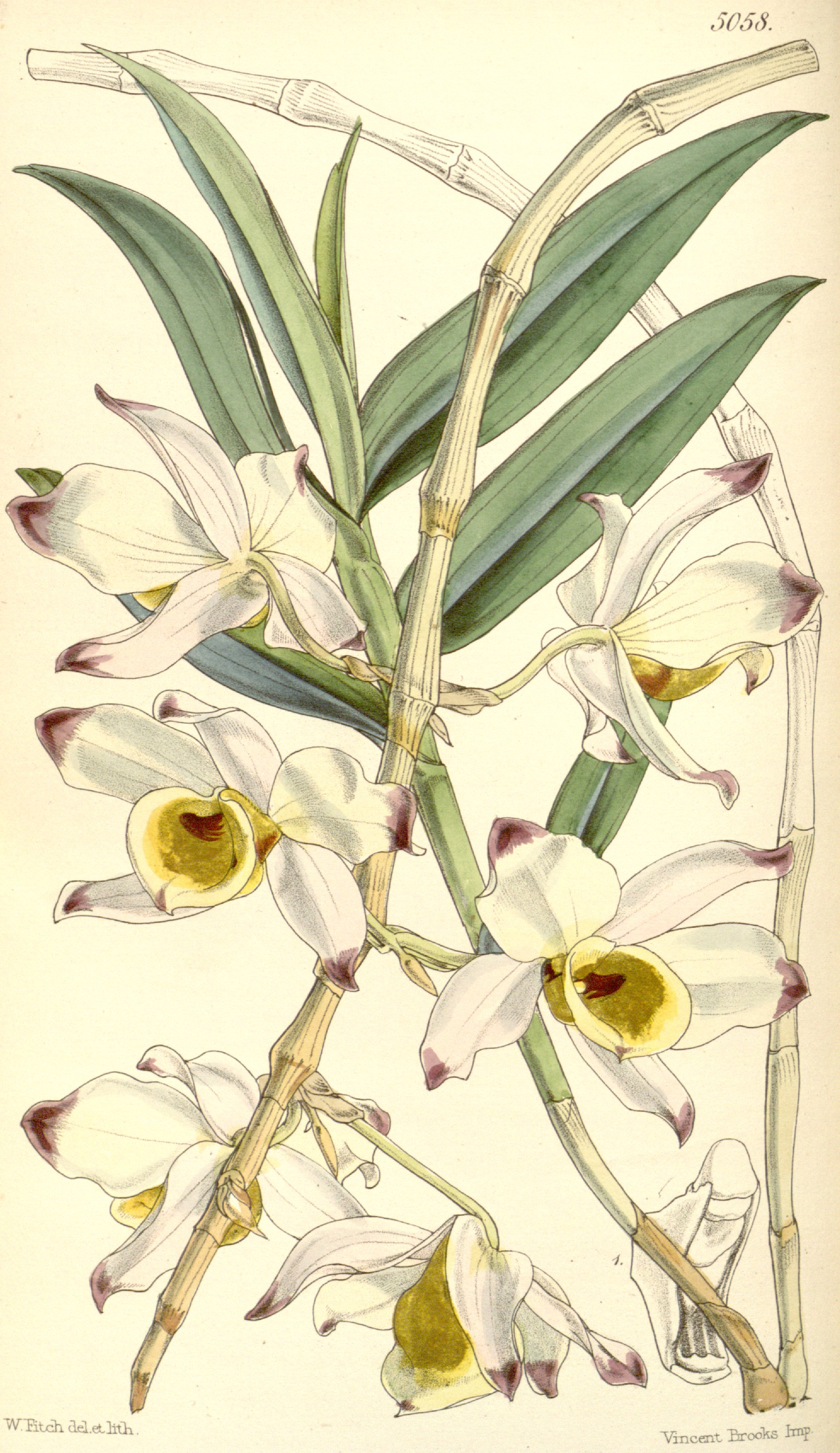
- 1857 illustration

Scientific classification
- Kingdom: Plantae
- Clade: Tracheophytes
- Clade: Angiosperms
- Clade: Monocots
- Order: Asparagales
- Family: Orchidaceae
- Subfamily: Epidendroideae
- Genus: Dendrobium
- Species: D. falconeri

Binomial name
- Dendrobium falconeri Hook. (1856)

Synonyms
- Callista falconeri (Hook.) Kuntze (1891); Dendrobium erythroglossum Hayata (1914); Dendrobium falconeri albidulum Rchb.f.; Dendrobium falconeri var. robustum Rchb.f.; Dendrobium falconeri var. giganteum B.S.Williams; Dendrobium falconeri var. albidulum (Rchb.f.) B.S.Williams; Dendrobium falconeri var. senapatianum C.Deori, Gogoi & A.A.Mao

= Dendrobium falconeri =

Species of orchid

Dendrobium falconeri is a species of orchid native to Asia.

It is native to southern China (Hunan, Yunnan), Taiwan, the Eastern Himalayas (Bhutan), Northeastern India (Arunachal Pradesh, Assam, and Sikkim), and northern Indochina (Myanmar, Thailand, Vietnam). Dendrobium falconeri can grow up to 60–120 cm (24–47 in) tall. The flowers are large and have white petals with purple tips. It grows on rocks and on tree trunks in dense forests.

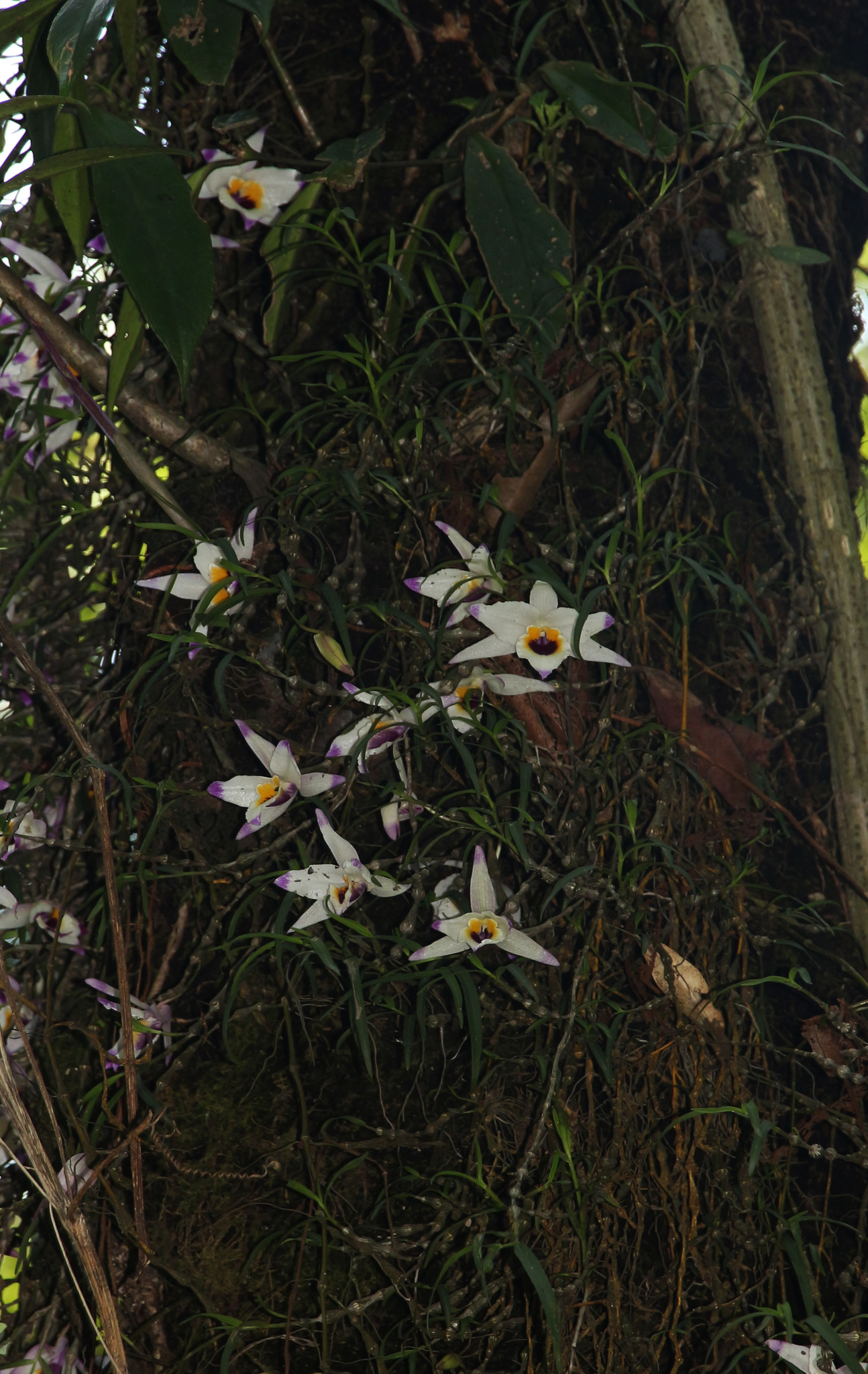
Living specimen

Its common name in Chinese is 串珠石斛 (chuan zhu shi hu).
