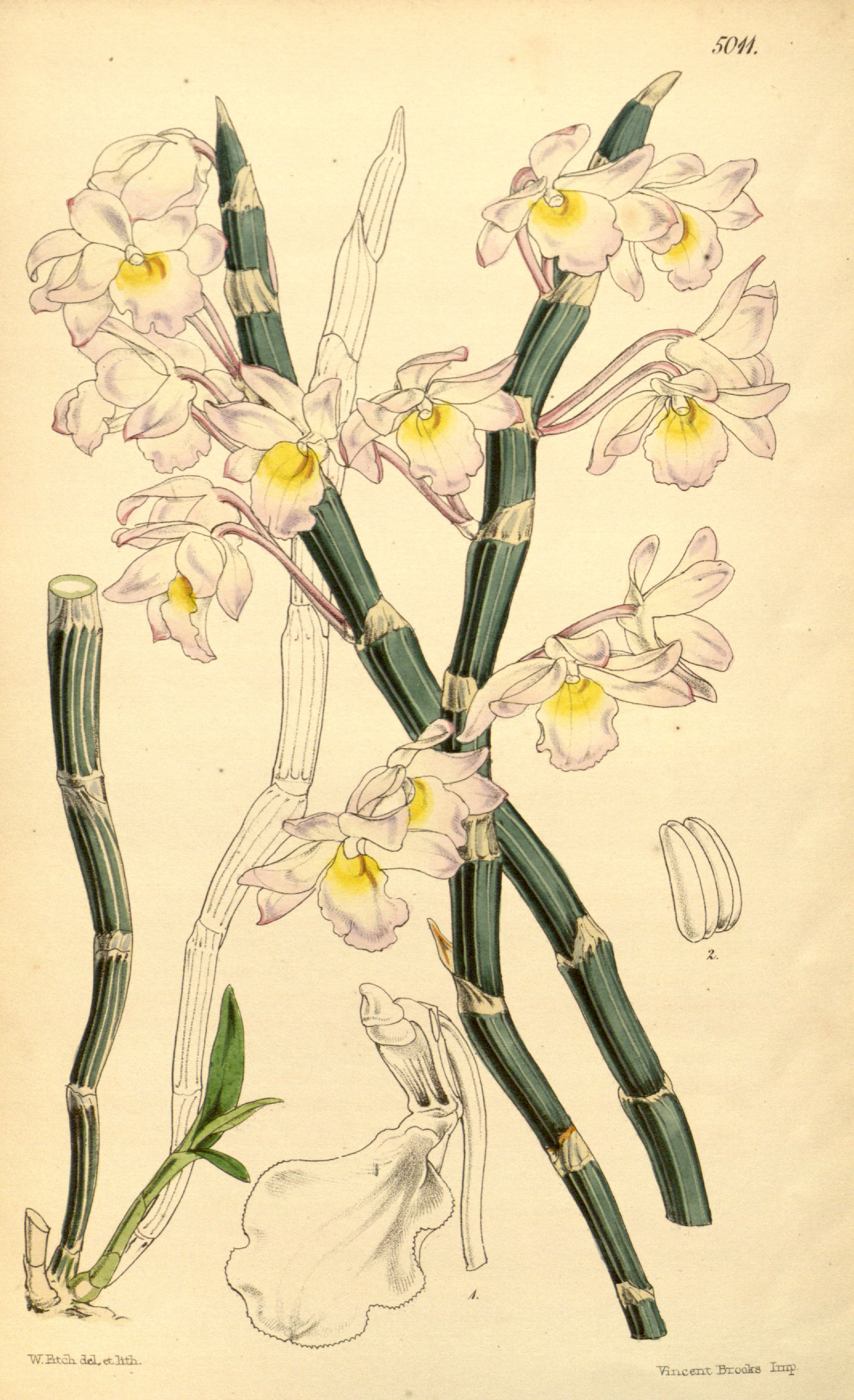
- 1856 illustration

Scientific classification
- Kingdom: Plantae
- Clade: Tracheophytes
- Clade: Angiosperms
- Clade: Monocots
- Order: Asparagales
- Family: Orchidaceae
- Subfamily: Epidendroideae
- Genus: Dendrobium
- Species: D. crepidatum

Binomial name
- Dendrobium crepidatum Lindl. & Paxton (1850)

Synonyms
- Dendrochilum roseum Dalzell (1852); Dendrobium lawianum Lindl. (1859); Callista crepidata (Lindl. & Paxton) Kuntze (1891); Callista lawiana (Lindl.) Kuntze (1891); Dendrobium actinomorphum Blatt. & Hallb. (1921)

= Dendrobium crepidatum =

Shoe-lipped dendrobium

Species of orchid

Dendrobium crepidatum (shoe-lipped dendrobium) is a species of orchid. It is native to southern China (Guizhou, Yunnan), the eastern Himalayas (India, Assam, Sikkim, Bhutan, Arunachal Pradesh, Nepal, Bangladesh), and northern Indochina (Laos, Myanmar, Thailand, Vietnam).
