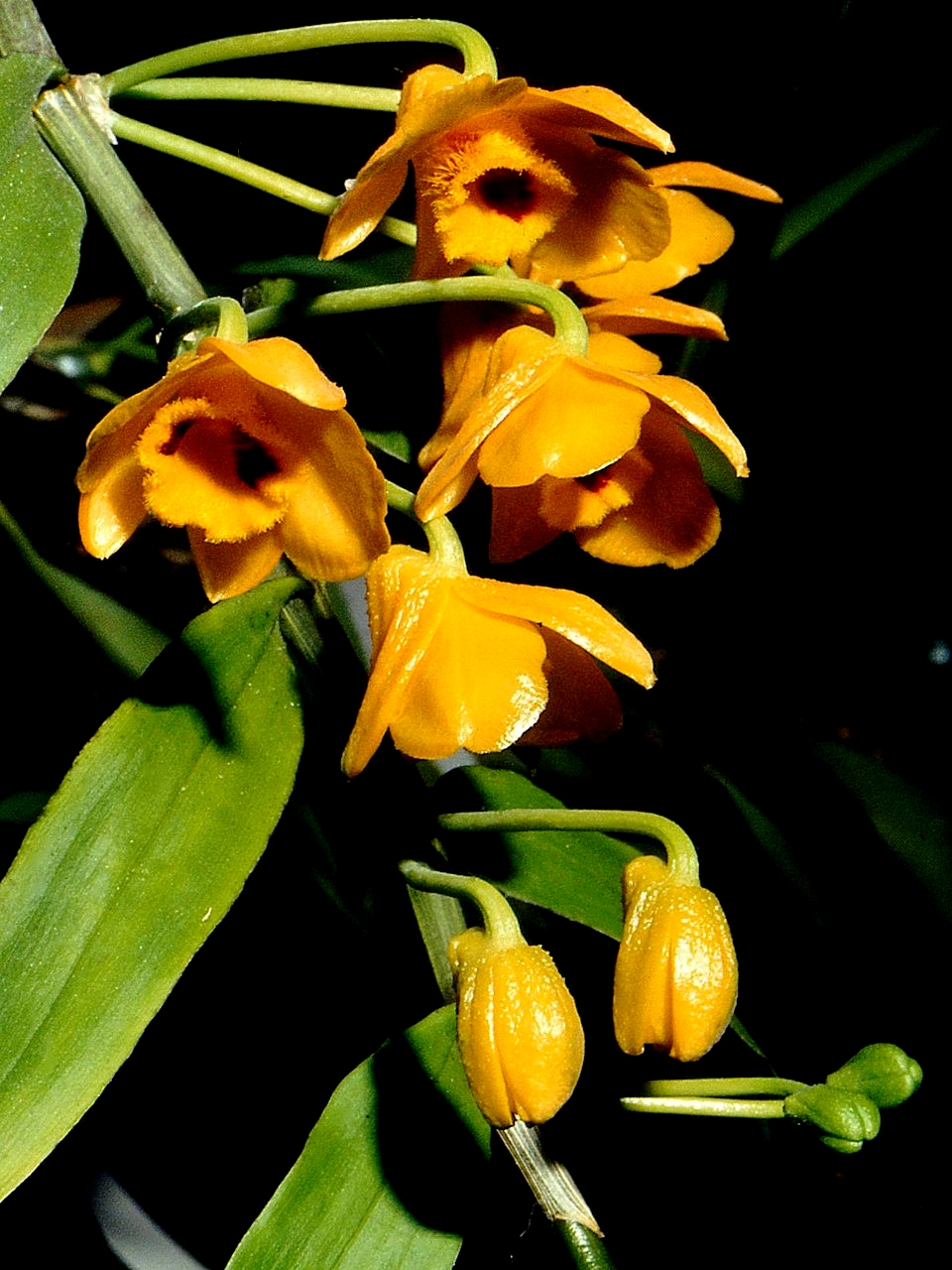

Scientific classification
- Kingdom: Plantae
- Clade: Tracheophytes
- Clade: Angiosperms
- Clade: Monocots
- Order: Asparagales
- Family: Orchidaceae
- Subfamily: Epidendroideae
- Genus: Dendrobium
- Species: D. chrysanthum

Binomial name
- Dendrobium chrysanthum Wall. ex Lindl. (1830)

Synonyms
- Dendrobium microphthalmum Van Geert; Dendrobium paxtonii Lindl. (1839); Dendrobium chrysanthum var. microphthalama Rchb.f. (1879); Dendrobium chrysanthum var. anophthalama Rchb.f. (1883); Callista chrysantha (Wall. ex Lindl.) Kuntze (1891)

= Dendrobium chrysanthum =

Golden yellow-flowered dendrobium

Species of orchid

Dendrobium chrysanthum (golden yellow-flowered dendrobium) is a species of orchid. It is native to China (Guangxi, Guizhou, Tibet, Yunnan), Indochina (Laos, Thailand, Myanmar, Vietnam) and the Himalayas (Nepal, Bhutan, Assam etc.).
