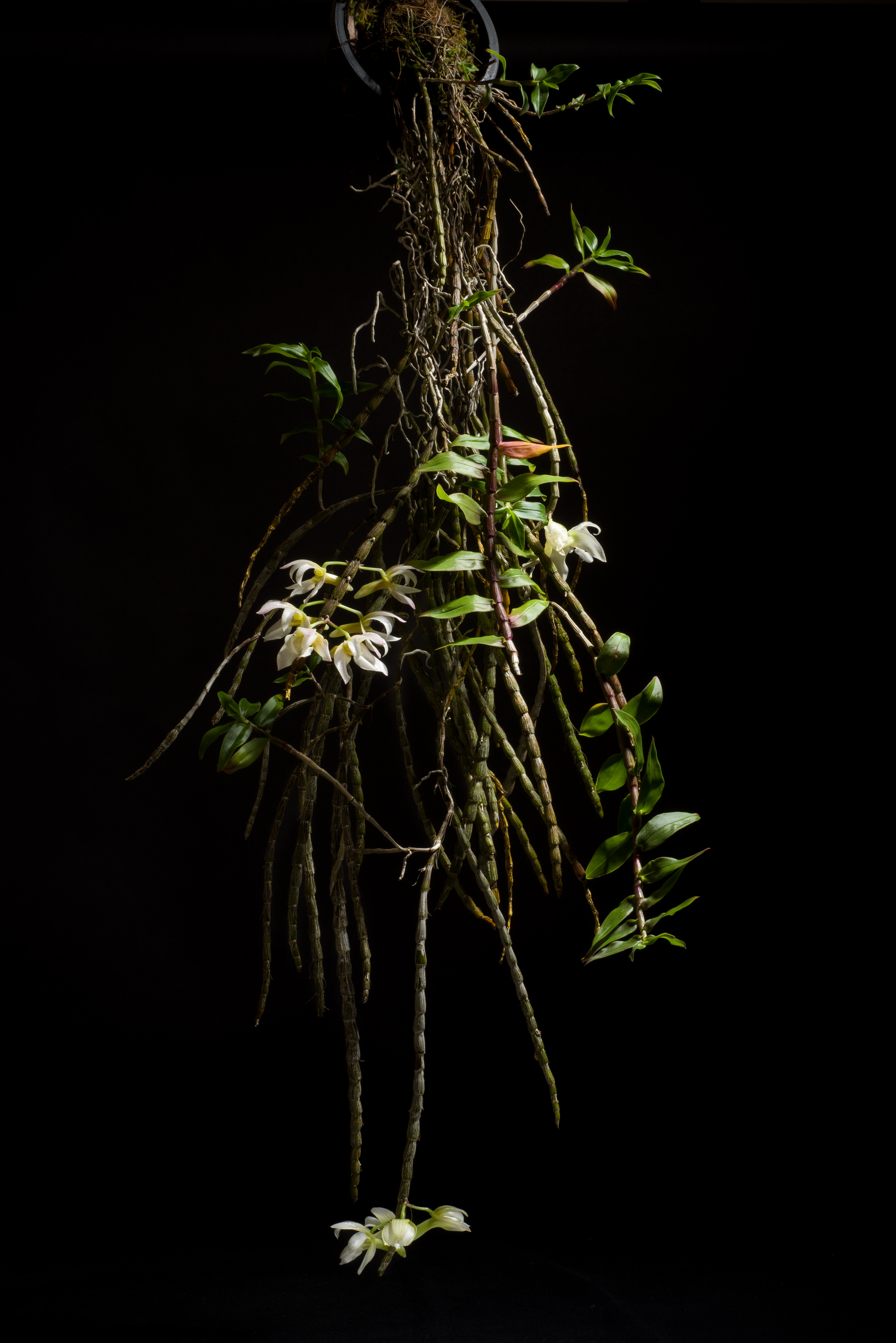
- Dendrobium chameleon

Scientific classification
- Kingdom: Plantae
- Clade: Tracheophytes
- Clade: Angiosperms
- Clade: Monocots
- Order: Asparagales
- Family: Orchidaceae
- Subfamily: Epidendroideae
- Genus: Dendrobium
- Section: Dendrobium sect. Calcarifera; J J Sm. 1908

Type species
- Dendrobium pedicellatum

Species
- See text

= Dendrobium sect. Calcarifera =

Subgenus of flowering plants

Dendrobium section Calcarifera is a section of the genus Dendrobium.

== Description ==
Plants in this section have short stems and pendent racemes growing on leafless stems.

== Distribution ==
Plants from this section are found growing in Southeast Asia.

== Species ==
Dendrobium section Calcarifera comprises the following species:

| Image | Name | Distribution | Elevation (m) |
|---|---|---|---|
| | Dendrobium acutimentum J.J.Sm. 1917 | Sumatra | 1,200 metres (3,900 ft) |
| | Dendrobium ainiae Rusea & Besi 2018 | Malaysia (Terengganu) | |
| | Dendrobium amethystoglossum Rchb.f. 1872 | Philippines (Luzon) | 1,400 metres (4,600 ft) |
| | Dendrobium annae J.J.Sm. 1905 | Sumatra and Java | |
| | Dendrobium annamense Rolfe 1906 | Vietnam | |
| | Dendrobium anthrene Ridl. 1896 | Sumatra and Borneo | 900–1,350 metres (2,950–4,430 ft) |
| | Dendrobium arcuatum J.J.Sm. 1905 | Java | 800 metres (2,600 ft) |
| | Dendrobium atjehense J.J.Sm. 1932 | Sumatra | |
| | Dendrobium boosii Cootes & W.Suarez 2011 | Philippines | |
| | Dendrobium bunuanense Ames 1925 | Philippines (Mindanao) | 1,650 metres (5,410 ft) |
| | Dendrobium calcariferum Carr 1935 | Borneo ( Sabah and Sarawak) | 0–1,500 metres (0–4,921 ft) |
| | Dendrobium ceraula Rchb.f. 1876 | Philippines | 1,300 metres (4,300 ft) |
| | Dendrobium chameleon Ames 1908 | Philippines and Taiwan | 600–1,000 metres (2,000–3,300 ft) |
| | Dendrobium chewiorum J.J.Wood & A.L.Lamb 2008 | Borneo (Sabah) | 400 metres (1,300 ft) |
| | Dendrobium compressimentum J.J.Sm. 1928 | Sumatra | 1,400–1,800 metres (4,600–5,900 ft) |
| | Dendrobium corallorhizon J.J.Sm. 1931 | Brunei, Borneo | 1,300–1,600 metres (4,300–5,200 ft) |
| | Dendrobium cowenii P.O'Byrne & J.J.Verm. 2007 | Thailand | |
| | Dendrobium crabro Ridl. 1908 | Borneo ( Sarawak) | 500 metres (1,600 ft) |
| | Dendrobium crassimarginatum L.O.Williams 1937 | Philippines (Leyte) | 600–1,000 metres (2,000–3,300 ft) |
| | Dendrobium crocatum Hook.f. 1890 | Malaysia and Thailand | |
| | Dendrobium croceocentrum J.J.Sm. 1920 | Sumatra | 400–600 metres (1,300–2,000 ft) |
| | Dendrobium cumulatum Lindl. 1855 | India (Assam), Nepal, Bhutan, Sikkim, Myanmar, Thailand, Cambodia, Laos, Vietnam and Borneo | 300–1,500 metres (980–4,920 ft) |
| | Dendrobium cymbicallum P.O'Byrne & J.J.Wood 2007 | Borneo (Sabah) | 1,500 metres (4,900 ft) |
| | Dendrobium cymboglossum J.J.Wood & A.L.Lamb 1994 | Borneo | 400–700 metres (1,300–2,300 ft) |
| | Dendrobium derekcabactulanii Cootes, Pimentel & M.Leon 2017 | Philippines (Mindanao) | 1,600 metres (5,200 ft) |
| | Dendrobium derryi Ridl. 1907 | Sumatra, Borneo and peninsular Malaysia | 500–1,700 metres (1,600–5,600 ft) |
| | Dendrobium dianiae Metusala, P.O'Byrne & J.J.Wood 2010 | Borneo (Kalimantan) | 300–900 metres (980–2,950 ft) |
| | Dendrobium diffusum L.O.Williams 1937 | Philippines (Mindanao, Mindoro) | 600 metres (2,000 ft) |
| | Dendrobium doloissumbinii J.J.Wood 2009 | Borneo (Kalimantan and Sabah) | 600–700 metres (2,000–2,300 ft) |
| | Dendrobium endertii J.J.Sm. 1931 | Borneo | 1,000–1,500 metres (3,300–4,900 ft) |
| | Dendrobium fairchildiae Ames & Quisumb. 1932 | Philippines | 1,200 metres (3,900 ft) |
| | Dendrobium fimbrilabium J.J.Sm. 1920 | northern Sumatra | |
| | Dendrobium floresianum Metusala & P.O'Byrne 2009 | Flores Island | 600 metres (2,000 ft) |
| | Dendrobium flos-wanua Metusala, P.O'Byrne & J.J.Wood 2010 | Borneo (Kalimantan) | |
| | Dendrobium foxii Ridl. 1900 | peninsular Malaysia | 900–1,300 metres (3,000–4,300 ft) |
| | Dendrobium fulminicaule J.J.Sm. 1917 | Sumatra | |
| | Dendrobium gayoense Frankie Handoyo, Jim Cootes und Y. R. Yudistira 2020 | Sumatra | 1,400–2,000 metres (4,600–6,600 ft) |
| | Dendrobium gemellum Lindl. 1830 | Malaysia, Sumatra, Java and the Moluccas | 500–2,000 metres (1,600–6,600 ft) |
| | Dendrobium grastidioides J.J.Sm. 1920 | western Sumatra | 1,700–1,900 metres (5,600–6,200 ft) |
| | Dendrobium guerreroi Ames & Quisumb. 1932 | Philippines | 500 metres (1,600 ft) |
| | Dendrobium hamaticalcar J.J.Wood & Dauncey 1993 | Borneo (Sabah) | 400–1,400 metres (1,300–4,600 ft) |
| | Dendrobium hamatum Rolfe 1894 | Vietnam | |
| | Dendrobium hughii Rchb.f. 1882 | peninsular Malaysia | 1,220–1,680 metres (4,000–5,510 ft) |
| | Dendrobium hymenophyllum Lindl. 1830 | Sumatra and Java | 600–1,250 metres (1,970–4,100 ft) |
| | Dendrobium inflatum Rolfe 1895 | Bali and Java | 920–1,220 metres (3,020–4,000 ft) |
| | Dendrobium intricatum Gagnep. 1930 | Cambodia, Thailand and Vietnam | |
| | Dendrobium ionopus Rchb.f. 1882 | Philippines (Luzon), Java, and Japan | 500–1,200 metres (1,600–3,900 ft) |
| | Dendrobium jimcootesii Cabactulan & M.Leon 2016 | Philippines (Mindanao) | |
| | Dendrobium kelamense Metusala, P.O'Byrne & J.J.Wood 2010 | Borneo (Kalimantan) | 500–800 metres (1,600–2,600 ft) |
| | Dendrobium kentrochilum Hook.f. 1890 | Malaysia (Perak) | |
| | Dendrobium klabatense Schltr. 1910 | Sulawesi | 500–1,150 metres (1,640–3,770 ft) |
| | Dendrobium kruiense J.J.Sm. 1926 | Sumatra | |
| | Dendrobium lampongense J.J.Sm. 1908 | Thailand, Malaysia, Sabah and Sumatra | 200–400 metres (660–1,310 ft) |
| | Dendrobium lucens Rchb.f. 1863 | Borneo | |
| | Dendrobium maierae J.J.Sm. 1920 | Indonesia (Bali, Lesser Sunda Islands) | |
| | Dendrobium megaceras Hook.f. 1890 | peninsular Malaysia | |
| | Dendrobium metrium Kraenzl. 1910 | Cambodia, Laos, Malaya, Sumatera, Thailand, Vietnam | |
| | Dendrobium mizanii R.Go et E.E. Besi 2018 | Malaysia (Terengganu) | 1,300 metres (4,300 ft) |
| | Dendrobium montanum J.J.Sm. 1905 | Java | 1,400–2,000 metres (4,600–6,600 ft) |
| | Dendrobium muluense J.J.Wood 2008 | Borneo (Sarawak) | 50 metres (160 ft) |
| | Dendrobium mutabile (Blume) Lindl. 1830 | India, the Ryukyu Islands, Sumatra and Java | 700 metres (2,300 ft) |
| | Dendrobium nieuwenhuisii J.J.Sm. 1906 | Borneo (Kalimantan) | |
| | Dendrobium nudum (Blume) Lindl. 1830 | Java, Sumatra and Borneo | 1,200–2,000 metres (3,900–6,600 ft) |
| | Dendrobium obrienianum Kraenzl. 1892 | Philippines (Luzon) | |
| | Dendrobium paathii J.J.Sm. 1935 | Borneo (Sabah, Kalimantan) | 300–600 metres (980–1,970 ft) |
| | Dendrobium panduriferum Hook.f. 1890 | Myanmar, peninsular Thailand, Malaysia and Borneo (Sabah) | 250–600 metres (820–1,970 ft) |
| | Dendrobium pedicellatum J.J.Sm. 1908 | Sumatra | 1,300–2,900 metres (4,300–9,500 ft) |
| | Dendrobium phillipsii Ames & Quisumb. 1935 | Philippines (Mindanao) | 800 metres (2,600 ft) |
| | Dendrobium pictum Lindl. 1862 | Borneo (Sabah, Sarawak) | 1,100 metres (3,600 ft) |
| | Dendrobium prianganense J.J.Wood & J.B.Comber 1988 | western Java | 950 metres (3,120 ft) |
| | Dendrobium profusum Rchb.f. 1884 | Philippines | 300–500 metres (980–1,640 ft) |
| | Dendrobium punbatuense J.J.Wood 2008 | Borneo (Sabah) | 400–1,000 metres (1,300–3,300 ft) |
| | Dendrobium rantii J.J.Sm. 1934 | Sulawesi | 1,000–1,600 metres (3,300–5,200 ft) |
| | Dendrobium ravanii Cootes 2008 | Philippines (Mindanao) | 500–800 metres (1,600–2,600 ft) |
| | Dendrobium reypimentelii Cootes, Cabactulan & M.Leon 2017 | Philippines (Mindanao) | 900–1,600 metres (3,000–5,200 ft) |
| | Dendrobium rhodocentrum Rchb.f. 1872 | Myanmar | |
| | Dendrobium roseatum Ridl. 1896 | peninsular Malaysia | 1,300–1,600 metres (4,300–5,200 ft) |
| | Dendrobium roseosparsum P.O'Byrne & J.J.Verm. 2004 | Sulawesi | 500 metres (1,600 ft) |
| | Dendrobium ruseae Besi & Dome 2018 | Malaysia (Terengganu) | |
| | Dendrobium sanguinolentum Lindl. 1842 | Borneo, Jawa, Malaya, Philippine (Sulu Archipelago)s, Sumatera, Thailand | 600–900 metres (2,000–3,000 ft) |
| | Dendrobium sarawakense Merr. 1921 | Borneo (Sarawak) | |
| | Dendrobium schettleri Cootes, Cabactulan, Pimentel & M.Leon 2017 | | |
| | Dendrobium serena-alexianum J.J.Wood & A.L.Lamb 2008 | Borneo (Sabah, Kalimantan) | 200–600 metres (660–1,970 ft) |
| | Dendrobium serratilabium L.O.Williams 1937 | Philippines (Luzon) | |
| | Dendrobium spathilabium Ames & C.Schweinf. 1934 | Sumatra | 1,100–1,700 metres (3,600–5,600 ft) |
| | Dendrobium spathilingue J.J.Sm. 1913 | Java, Bali, Borneo (Kalimantan) | 500–800 metres (1,600–2,600 ft) |
| | Dendrobium speckmaieri Fessel & Lückel 2002 | Sulawesi | |
| | Dendrobium subflavidum Ridl. 1908 | Thailand and Malaysia | 910–1,800 metres (2,990–5,910 ft) |
| | Dendrobium swartzii A.D.Hawkes & A.H.Heller 1957 | Borneo | |
| | Dendrobium tanjiewhoei J.J.Wood & C.L.Chan 2014 | Borneo (Sabah) | 800 metres (2,600 ft) |
| | Dendrobium terengganuensis Rosli & Latiff 2009 | peninsular Malaysia | 200–300 metres (660–980 ft) |
| | Dendrobium transtilliferum J.J.Sm. 1922 | western Sumatra | 1,500 metres (4,900 ft) |
| | Dendrobium tropaeoliflorum Hook.f. 1890 | peninsular Malaysia | |
| | Dendrobium ventrilabium J.J.Sm. 1922 | western Sumatra | |
| | Dendrobium victoriae-reginae Loher 1897 | Philippines | 1,300–2,700 metres (4,300–8,900 ft) |
| | Dendrobium yeageri Ames & Quisumb. 1934 | Philippines (Luzon) | |
| | Dendrobium yongii J.J.Wood 2008 | Borneo (Sarawak) | |
