= List of moths of Australia (Limacodidae) =

Partial list of Australian moths

This is a list of the Australian moth species of the family Limacodidae. It also acts as an index to the species articles and forms part of the full List of moths of Australia.

- Anaxidia lactea Swinhoe, 1892
- Anaxidia lozogramma (Turner, 1902)
- Anepopsia eugyra Turner, 1926
- Anepopsia tephraea Turner, 1926
- Apodecta monodisca Turner, 1902
- Birthamoides plagioscia Turner, 1902
- Calcarifera ordinata (Butler, 1886)
- Chalcocelis albiguttatus (Snellen, 1879)
- Chalcocelis castanica Turner, 1926
- Comana albibasis Walker, 1862
- Comana collaris Walker, 1865
- Comana corones (Fabricius, 1775)
- Comana cosmocalla Lower, 1902
- Comana euryparoa Turner, 1927
- Comana idiomorpa
- Comana inexpectata Hering, 1931
- Comana miltochyta (Turner, 1932)
- Comana miltogramma Meyrick, 1891
- Comana mjobergi (Aurivillius, 1920)
- Comana monomorpha Turner, 1904
- Comana resplendens (Turner, 1926)
- Comanula uniformis Swinhoe, 1892
- Doratifera casta (Scott, 1864)
- Doratifera corallina Turner, 1902
- Doratifera ochroptila Turner, 1926
- Doratifera oxleyi (Newman, 1855)
- Doratifera pinguis Walker, 1855
- Doratifera quadriguttata (Walker, 1855)
- Doratifera stenora Turner, 1902
- Doratifera vulnerans (Lewin, 1805)
- Ecnomoctena brachyopa Lower, 1897
- Ecnomoctena hemitoma Turner, 1926
- Ecnomoctena sciobaphes Turner, 1941
- Elassoptila microxutha Turner, 1902
- Eloasa acrata (Turner, 1926)
- Eloasa atmodes (Turner, 1902)
- Eloasa bombycoides (Felder, 1874)
- Eloasa brevipennis (Hering, 1931)
- Eloasa calida Walker
- Eloasa callidesma (Lower, 1869)
- Eloasa infrequens (Scott, 1864)
- Eloasa liosarca (Lower, 1902)
- Eloasa luxa Swinhoe, 1902
- Eloasa perixera (Lower, 1902)
- Eloasa sphemosema
- Eloasa symphonistis (Turner, 1936)
- Hedraea quadridens Lucas, 1901
- Hydroclada antigona Meyrick, 1889
- Lamprolepida chrysochroa Felder, 1874
- Limacochara pulchra Bethune-Baker, 1904
- Mambara haplopis Turner, 1906
- Mambara delocrossa Hering, 1931
- Mecytha dnophera (Turner 1931)
- Mecytha fasciata (Walker, 1855)
- Parasoidea albicollaris Hering, 1931
- Parasoidea neurocausta (Turner, 1926)
- Parasoidea paroa (Turner, 1902)
- Praesusica placerodes (Turner, 1926)
- Pseudanapaea denotata (Walker, 1865)
- Pseudanapaea dentifascia Hering, 1931
- Pseudanapaea transvestita Hering, 1931
- Pygmaeomorpha aquila (H. Druce, 1899)
- Pygmaeomorpha modesta Bethune-Baker, 1904
- Pygmaeomorpha ocularis (T.P. Lucas, 1895)
- Scopelodes dinawa Bethune-Baker, 1904
- Scopelodes nitens Bethune-Baker, 1904
- Squamosa barymorpha (Turner, 1942)
- Thosea penthima Turner, 1902
- Thosea threnopis Turner, 1931
