= Ambaliha (disambiguation) =

Ambaliha is a municipality in Sofia Region, Madagascar.

Ambaliha may also refer to:

- Ambaliha, Kandreho a rural municipality in Kandreho District, Madagascar
- Ambaliha (moths), a genus of moths
  - Ambaliha lactea
  - Ambaliha lozogramma
