= Dendrobium moulmeinense =

The taxon Dendrobium moulmeinense refers to two species of orchids:

- Dendrobium moulmeinense R. Warner & B.S. Williams (1893), a synonym of Dendrobium infundibulum
- Dendrobium moulmeinense C.S.P. Parish ex Hook.f. (1890), a synonym of Dendrobium devonianum
