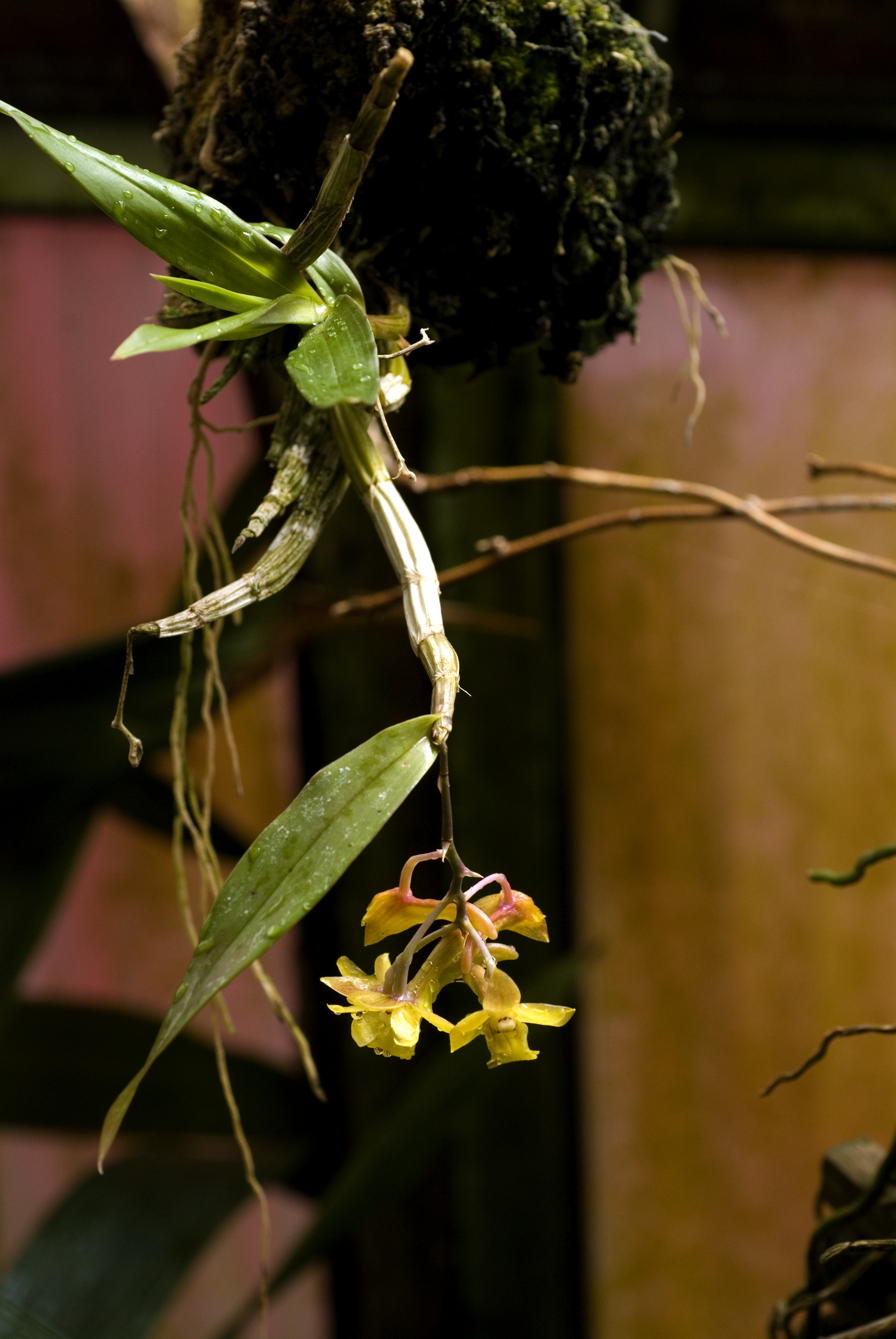

Scientific classification
- Kingdom: Plantae
- Clade: Tracheophytes
- Clade: Angiosperms
- Clade: Monocots
- Order: Asparagales
- Family: Orchidaceae
- Subfamily: Epidendroideae
- Genus: Dendrobium
- Species: D. guerreroi

Binomial name
- Dendrobium guerreroi Ames & Quisumb.

Synonyms
- Eurycaulis guerreroi (Ames & Quisumb.) M.A.Clem.

= Dendrobium guerreroi =

Species of orchid

Dendrobium guerreroi, or Guerrero's dendrobium, is a member of the family Orchidaceae endemic to the Philippines. It was named in honor of Mr. Guerrero, a Filipino orchid collector in the 1900s. This species is a small to medium to large sized, warm growing epiphyte with thin descendant, clumping pseudobulbs that rarely branch and carry many, unsubdivided, pointed fleshy leaves. Flowers are 3 centimeters and are yellow with light orange labia.
