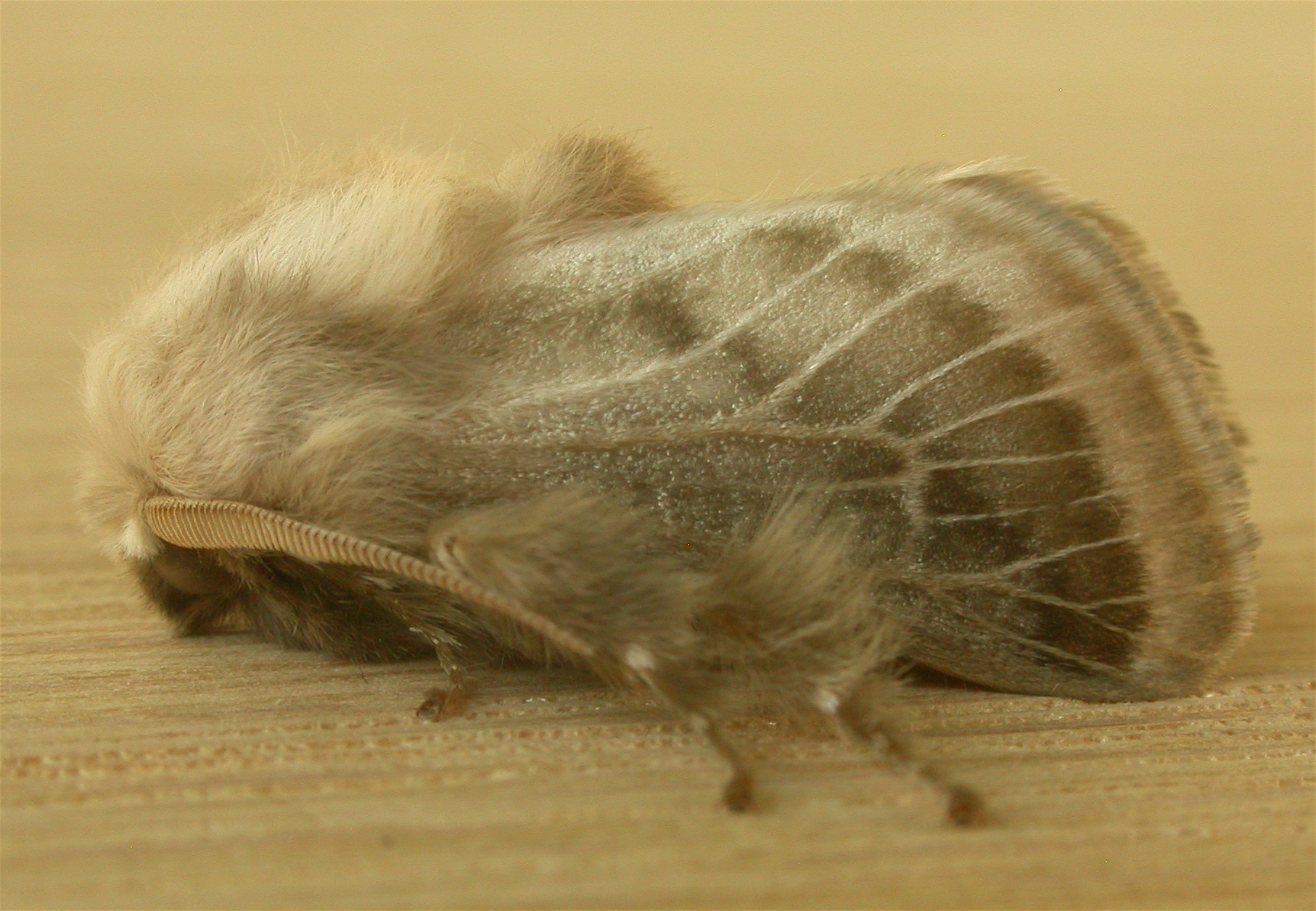

Scientific classification
- Domain: Eukaryota
- Kingdom: Animalia
- Phylum: Arthropoda
- Class: Insecta
- Order: Lepidoptera
- Family: Limacodidae
- Genus: Doratifera
- Species: D. pinguis

Binomial name
- Doratifera pinguis Walker, 1855

Synonyms
- Pelora olorina

= Doratifera pinguis =

Species of moth

Doratifera pinguis, the pale cup moth or sometimes the painted cup moth (although this name is usually for Doratifera oxleyi) is a moth of the family Limacodidae. The species was first described by Francis Walker in 1855. It is found over the whole eastern seaboard of Australia.

The wingspan is about 30 mm for males and about 40 mm for females.

The larvae feed on Eucalyptus species.
