= Dendrobium yeageri =

Scientific classification
- Kingdom: Plantae
- Clade: Tracheophytes
- Clade: Angiosperms
- Clade: Monocots
- Order: Asparagales
- Family: Orchidaceae
- Subfamily: Epidendroideae
- Genus: Dendrobium
- Species: D. yeageri

Binomial name
- Dendrobium yeageri Ames & Quisumb.

Species of orchid

Dendrobium yeageri (Yeager's dendrobium) is a species of the family Orchidaceae endemic to the Philippines named in honor of Dr. Clark Harvey Yeager. It is a small to medium-sized, warm growing epiphyte with thin descendant, clumping pseudobulbs that rarely branch and carry many, unsubdivided, pointed fleshy leaves. It has violet or purple inflorescences with a darker center of 3 to 4 centimetres (1.2 to 1.6 in).
