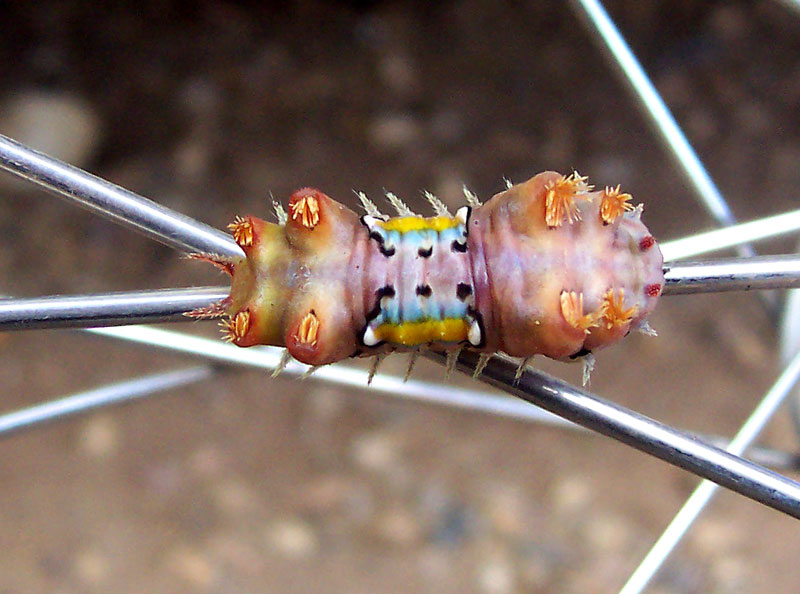
- Doratifera vulnerans

Scientific classification
- Domain: Eukaryota
- Kingdom: Animalia
- Phylum: Arthropoda
- Class: Insecta
- Order: Lepidoptera
- Family: Limacodidae
- Genus: Doratifera; Duncan, 1841

= Doratifera =

Genus of moths

Doratifera is a genus of cup-moth caterpillars in the family Limacodidae. The genus was erected by James Duncan in 1841. There are about 13 described species in Doratifera, found primarily in Australia. They are called cup-moths because of the shape of their cocoons. In the species Doratifera vulnerans, the venom has a complex structure having 151 different protein-based toxins produced from 59 distinct protein families. The venom can be used in pesticides and drugs.

== Species ==
These 13 species belong to the genus Doratifera:

- Doratifera casta Scott, 1864
- Doratifera corallina Turner, 1902
- Doratifera nagodina Hering, 1931
- Doratifera ochroptila Turner, 1926
- Doratifera olorina Turner, 1926
- Doratifera oxleyi Newman, 1855
- Doratifera pinguis Walker, 1855
- Doratifera quadriguttata Walker, 1855
- Doratifera rufa Bethune-Baker, 1904
- Doratifera stenora Turner, 1902
- Doratifera trigona Turner, 1942
- Doratifera unicolora Swinhoe, 1902
- Doratifera vulnerans Lewin, 1805
