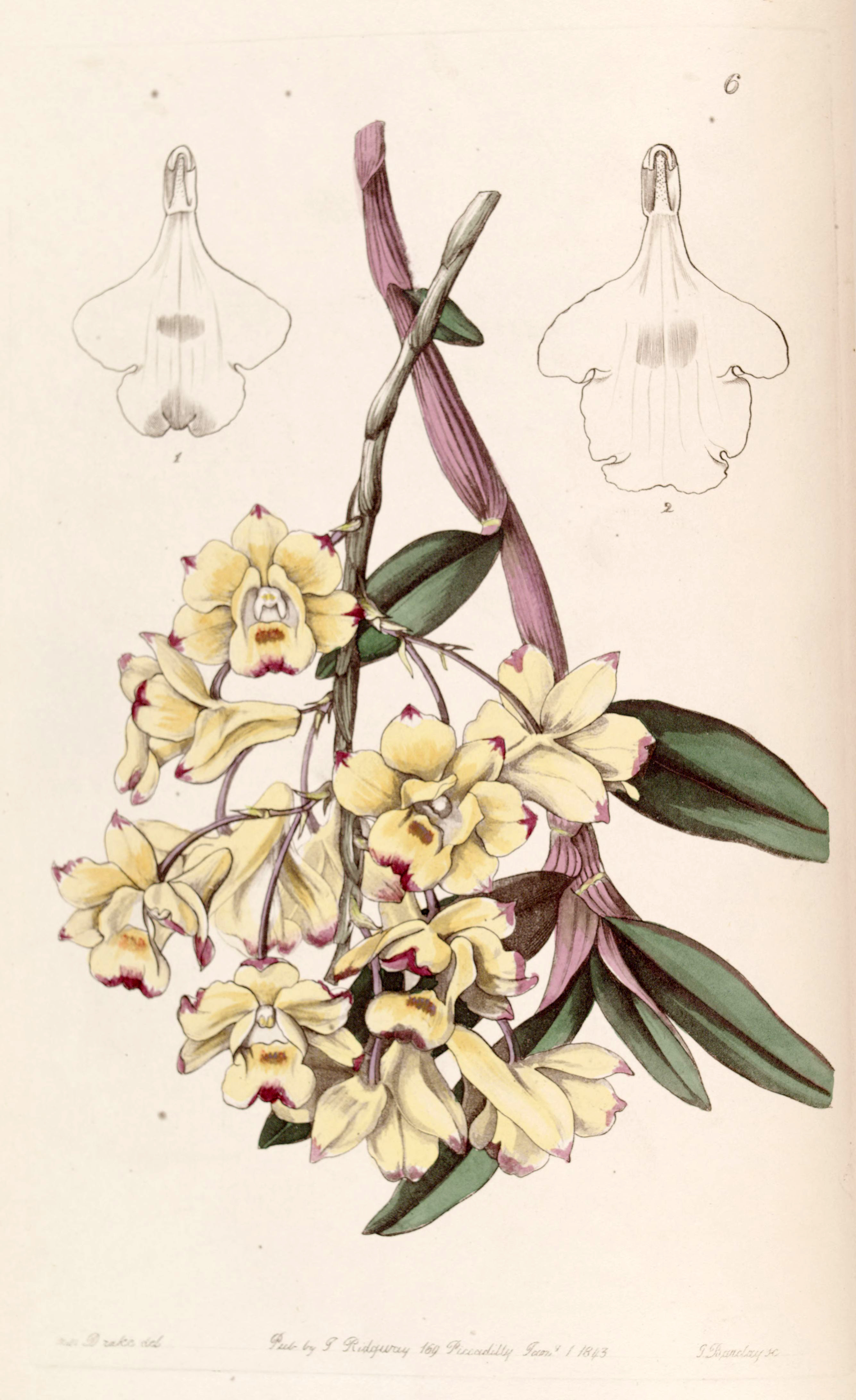
- 1843 illustration

Scientific classification
- Kingdom: Plantae
- Clade: Tracheophytes
- Clade: Angiosperms
- Clade: Monocots
- Order: Asparagales
- Family: Orchidaceae
- Subfamily: Epidendroideae
- Genus: Dendrobium
- Species: D. sanguinolentum

Binomial name
- Dendrobium sanguinolentum Lindl.

Synonyms
- Dendrobium cerinum Rchb.f.; Callista sanguinolenta (Lindl.) Kuntze; Pedilonum sanguinolentum (Lindl.) Brieger; Anisopetala sanguinolenta (Lindl.) M.A.Clem.; Eurycaulis cerinus (Rchb.f.) M.A.Clem.

= Dendrobium sanguinolentum =

Blood-stained dendrobium

Species of orchid

Dendrobium sanguinolentum, the blood-stained dendrobium, is a species of flowering plant in the family Orchidaceae. It is native to Southeast Asia (Thailand, Malaysia, Philippines, Borneo, Java, and Sumatra).
