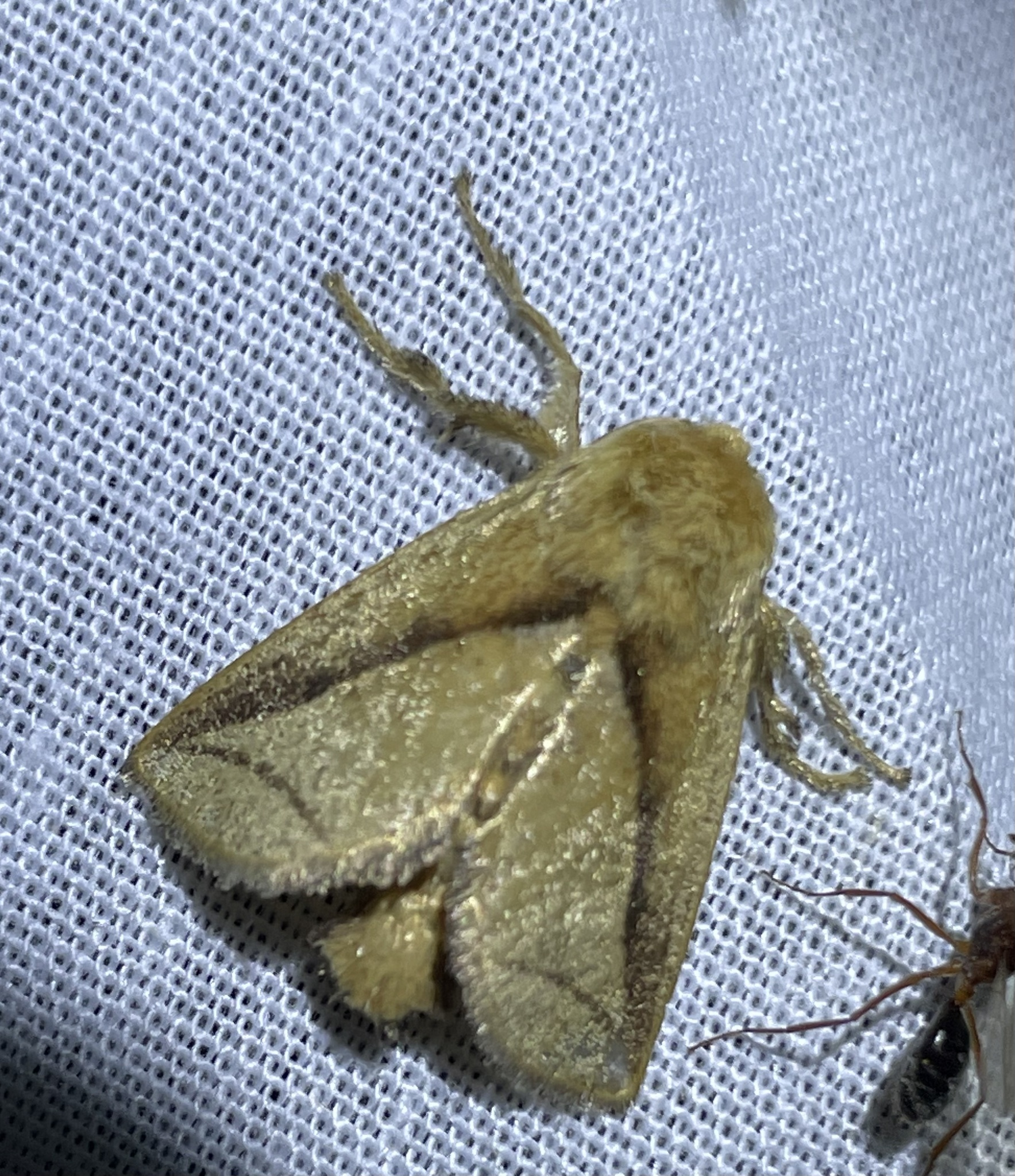
- Anaxidia lozogramma

Scientific classification
- Kingdom: Animalia
- Phylum: Arthropoda
- Class: Insecta
- Order: Lepidoptera
- Family: Limacodidae
- Genus: Anaxidia; Swinhoe, 1892

Species
- See text

Synonyms
- Ambaliha Swinhoe, 1892; Anaxidea Turner, 1926

= Anaxidia =

Genus of moths

Anaxidia is a genus of Limacodid moths found in Australia, including Western Australia.

== Selected species ==
- Anaxidia lactea Swinhoe, 1892
- Anaxidia lozogramma (Turner, 1902)
