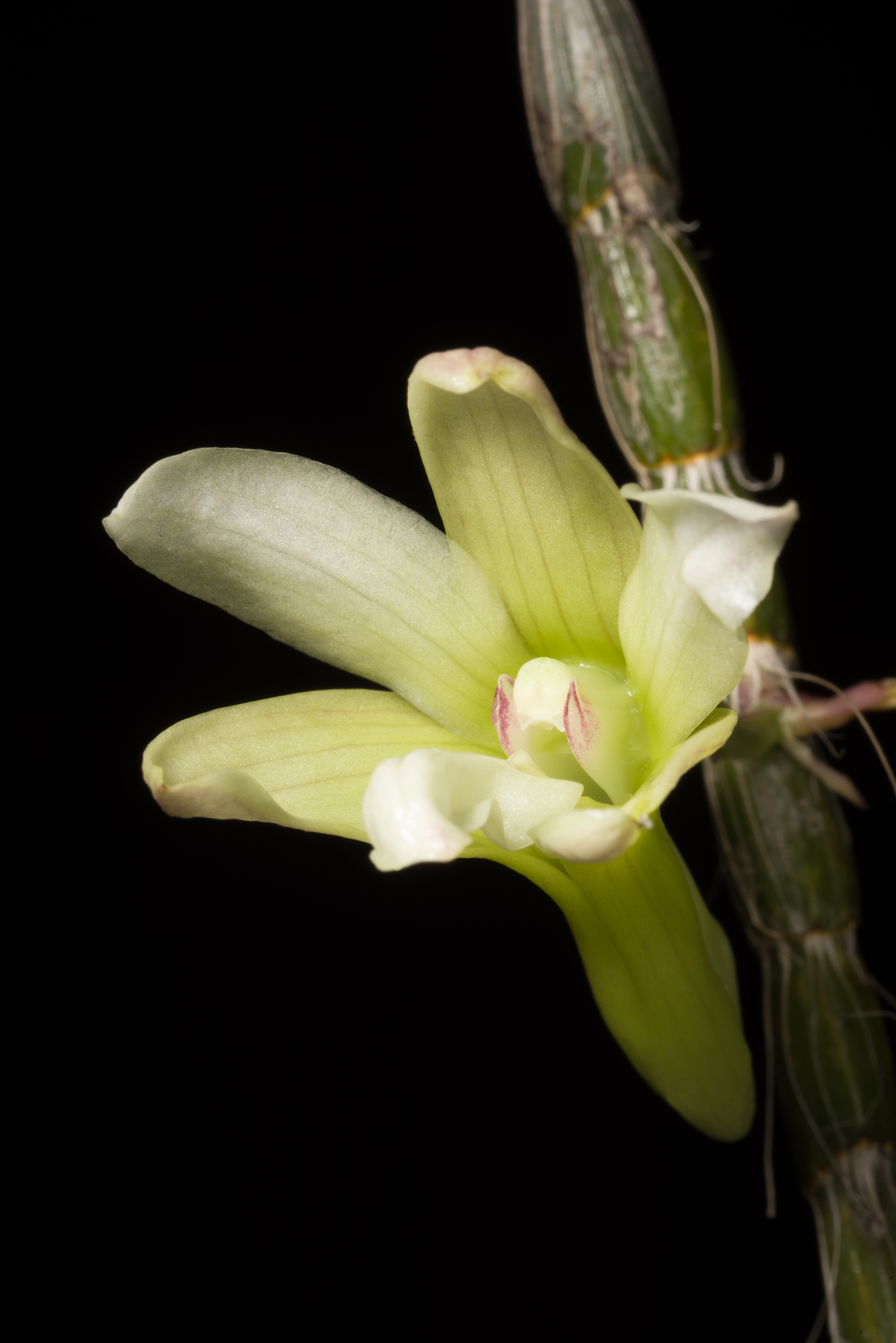

Scientific classification
- Kingdom: Plantae
- Clade: Tracheophytes
- Clade: Angiosperms
- Clade: Monocots
- Order: Asparagales
- Family: Orchidaceae
- Subfamily: Epidendroideae
- Genus: Dendrobium
- Species: D. chameleon

Binomial name
- Dendrobium chameleon Ames, 1908

Synonyms
- Dendrobium longicalcaratum Hayata 1914; Dendrobium randaiense Hayata 1911; Pedilonum longicalcaratum (Hayata) Rauschert 1983; Dendrobium chameleon var. ovatilabium Ames & Quisumb.; Dendrobium chameleon f. alba Ames & Quisumb.

= Dendrobium chameleon =

Chameleon dendrobium

Species of orchid

Dendrobium chameleon (chameleleon dendrobium) is a species of orchid of the genus Dendrobium. It is native to the Philippines and Taiwan. The size of the flowers varies from 2.5 to 3.75 cm.
