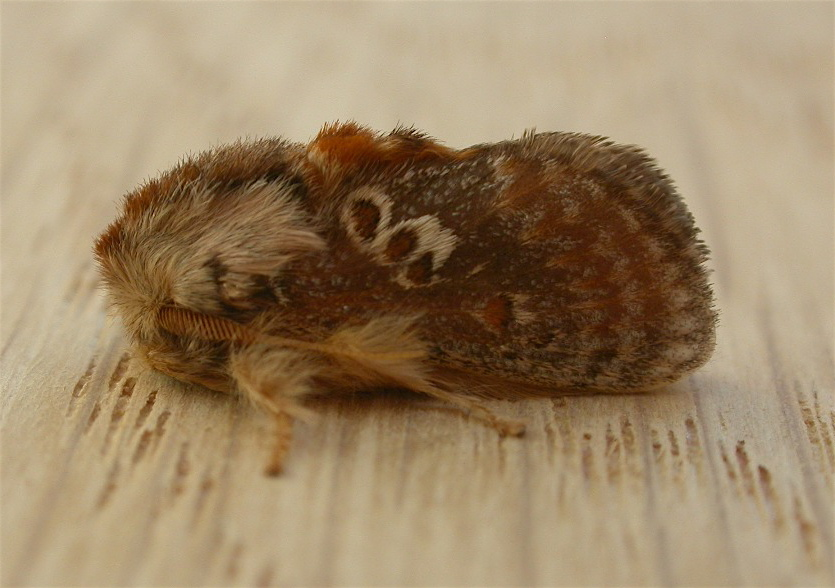

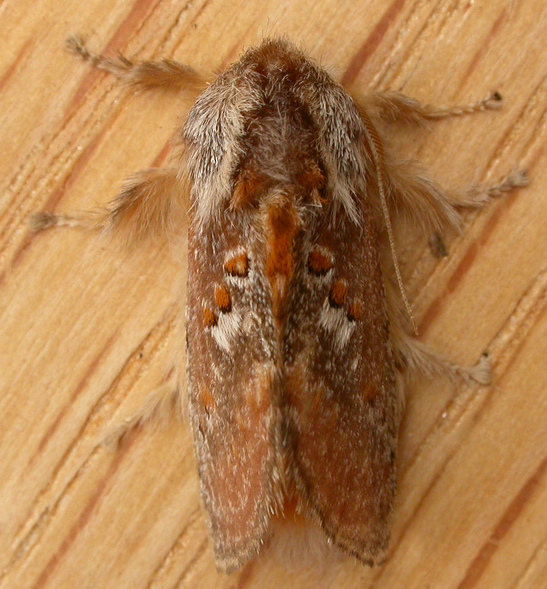

Scientific classification
- Kingdom: Animalia
- Phylum: Arthropoda
- Clade: Pancrustacea
- Class: Insecta
- Order: Lepidoptera
- Family: Limacodidae
- Genus: Pseudanapaea
- Species: P. transvestita

Binomial name
- Pseudanapaea transvestita Hering, 1931

Synonyms
- Anapaea trigona

= Pseudanapaea transvestita =

Species of moth

Pseudanapaea transvestita, the orange cup moth, is a species of moth of the family Limacodidae. It is found in the east of Australia.
