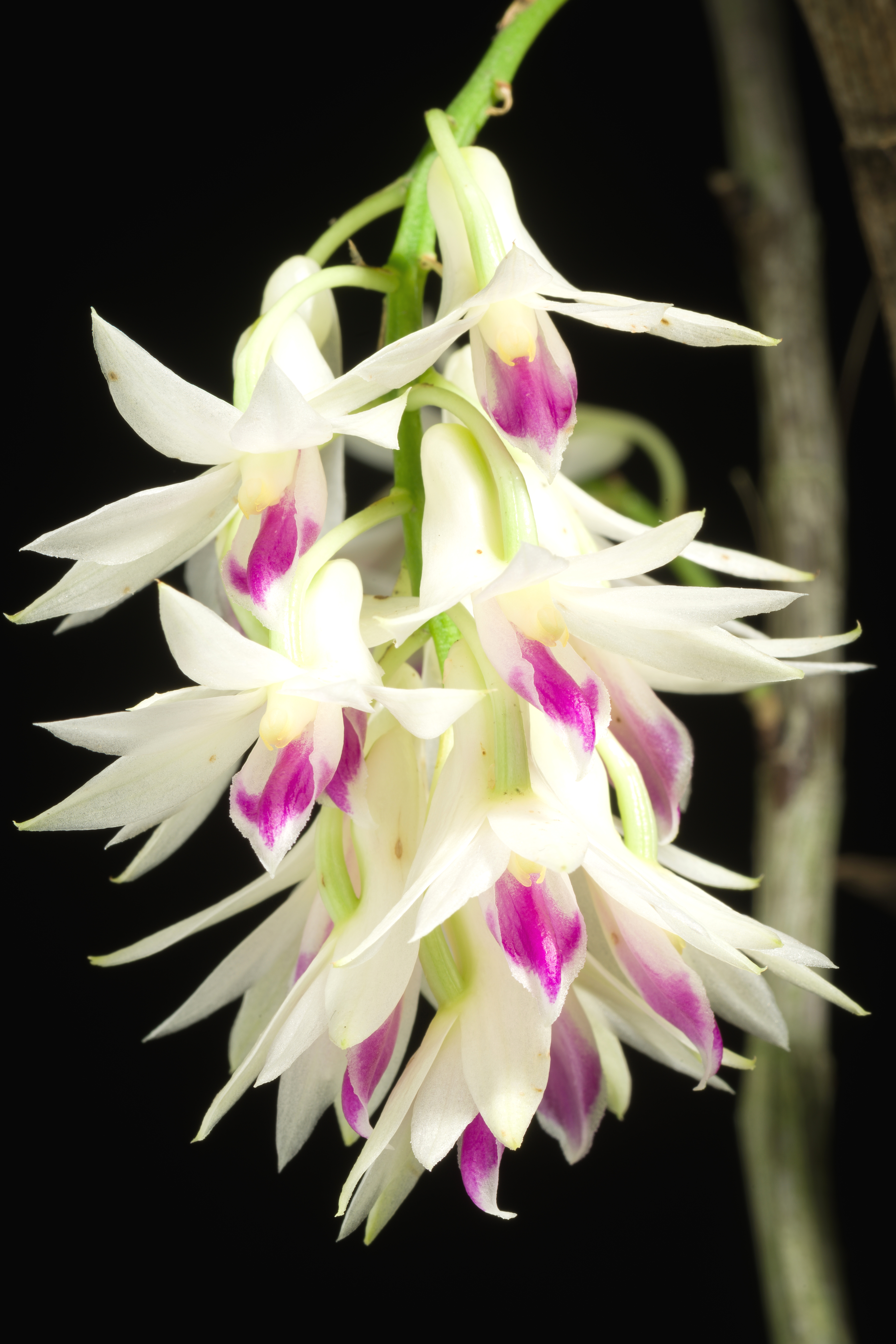

Conservation status
- CITES Appendix II

Scientific classification
- Kingdom: Plantae
- Clade: Embryophytes
- Clade: Tracheophytes
- Clade: Spermatophytes
- Clade: Angiosperms
- Clade: Monocots
- Order: Asparagales
- Family: Orchidaceae
- Subfamily: Epidendroideae
- Genus: Dendrobium
- Species: D. amethystoglossum

Binomial name
- Dendrobium amethystoglossum Rchb.f. (1872)

Synonyms
- Callista amethystoglossa (Rchb.f.) Kuntze (1891); Pedilonum amethystoglossum (Rchb.f.) M.A. Clem. (2003)

= Dendrobium amethystoglossum =

Amethyst-colored dendrobium

Species of orchid

Dendrobium amethystoglossum, the amethyst-colored dendrobium, is a species of orchid endemic to the Island of Luzon in the Philippines but cultivated elsewhere as an ornamental.
