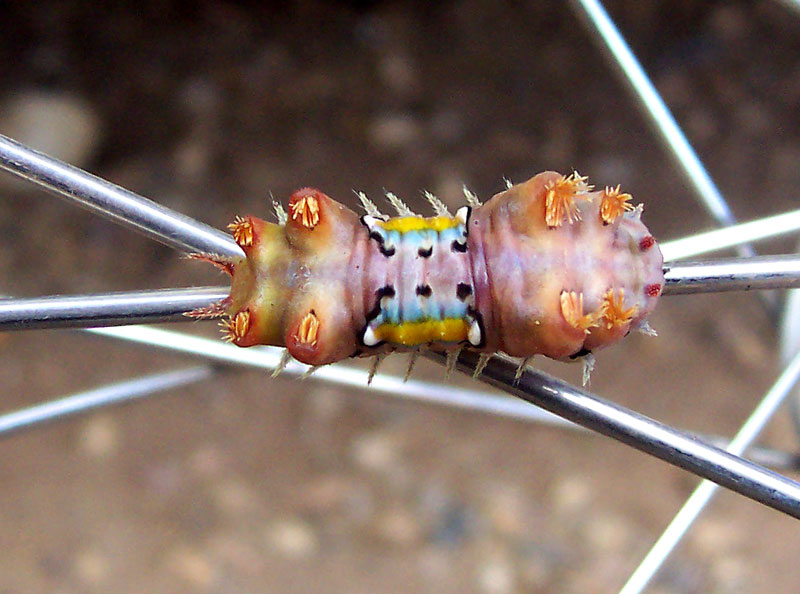
- Caterpillar of Doratifera vulnerans

Scientific classification
- Kingdom: Animalia
- Phylum: Arthropoda
- Clade: Pancrustacea
- Class: Insecta
- Order: Lepidoptera
- Family: Limacodidae
- Genus: Doratifera
- Species: D. vulnerans

Binomial name
- Doratifera vulnerans Lewin, 1805

Synonyms
- Bombyx vulnerans, Lewin, 1805

= Doratifera vulnerans =

Species of moth

Doratifera vulnerans, commonly known as the mottled cup moth, Australian cup moth or Chinese Junk (referring to its caterpillar), is a species of cup moth of the family Limacodidae. The species was first described by John Lewin in 1805 and is the type species of the genus Doratifera. It is found in Australia. It is known for its caterpillar having unique stinging spines or hairs that contain toxins, for which the scientific name is given that means "bearer of gifts of wounds". Chemical and genetic analysis in 2021 show that its caterpillar contains 151 toxins, some of which have medicinal properties.

== Biology ==
D. vulnerans is a small moth having a characteristic rust-coloured (ferruginous) body. The head region surrounding the antennae are white. It has two pairs of legs, and the two fore legs have white bands. The leg hairs, palpi, are white at the tip and brown at the base. The two fore wings are hairy with shiny rust colour and silvery margins. Two hind wings are dull white with the edges slightly whitish. The main body is entirely light brown. Males and females are very similar except that males are slightly smaller. Males measure 2 cm while females can be up to 5 cm across the wingspans.

=== Larva ===
The caterpillars of D. vulnerans are only about 2 cm long. They are distinctively banded with different colours, considered as an evolutionary means of displaying its dangerousness (a phenomenon called aposematism). They are broad, thick and short. There are four reddish and spiny projections on the anterior and posterior ends. The anterior end can be distinguished by its stouter appearance and the presence of a pair of tiny and reddish spine (antennae) compared to the posterior end that bears two slender but elongated whitish tails. The eight projections can pop up about a hundred of yellow needle-like stinging hairs or spines.

It was John Lewin who discovered that the sting of these hairs are painful due to the presence of toxins. He described this feature is a defence mechanism against predators. The caterpillars do not expose these spines unless they are stimulated or agitated by other animals. When the spines are in contact, the tips are easily broken thereby releasing the toxins, which can induce severely inflamed swellings. The general colour is grey studded with many dark spots and streaks. On each side of the body there is a clear yellow band lined with green band, giving a saddle-like appearance.

=== Life cycle ===
D. vulnerans lays their eggs in clusters on leaves and cover them with their body hairs. The eggs are commonly found on Eucalyptus leaves. Sometimes they also use other trees including guava and apricot. As the eggs hatch, the larvae feed on the leaves. They grow for about two weeks, after which they form cocoons and remain hanging on trees for two weeks. The cocoons have circular lids which can be conveniently pushed open by the moths as they emerge.

== Toxins ==
In 2021, researchers at the University of Queensland reported that the venom of D. vulnerans contains a mixture of at least 151 different toxins. These toxins are all proteins or derivatives of proteins, and some of them are chemically similar to insect neuropeptide, linear cationic peptides, and cysteine-rich peptides of the spider venom. When they isolated some of the toxins, they found that some of them have medicinal properties such as the ability to kill pathogenic bacteria and helminth parasites. Among the toxins, cecropin was identified as the pain-causing chemical. It was experimented with bacteria and helminths in which it specifically destroys the cell membranes, thus, has antibiotic and anthelmintic properties. In other studies, it is also known to have antifungal and anti-cancer activities. Another protein named DV33 can kill the sheep's roundworm Haemonchus contortus. There are also proteins that act on nervous system and can have beneficial effects such as in epilepsy.
