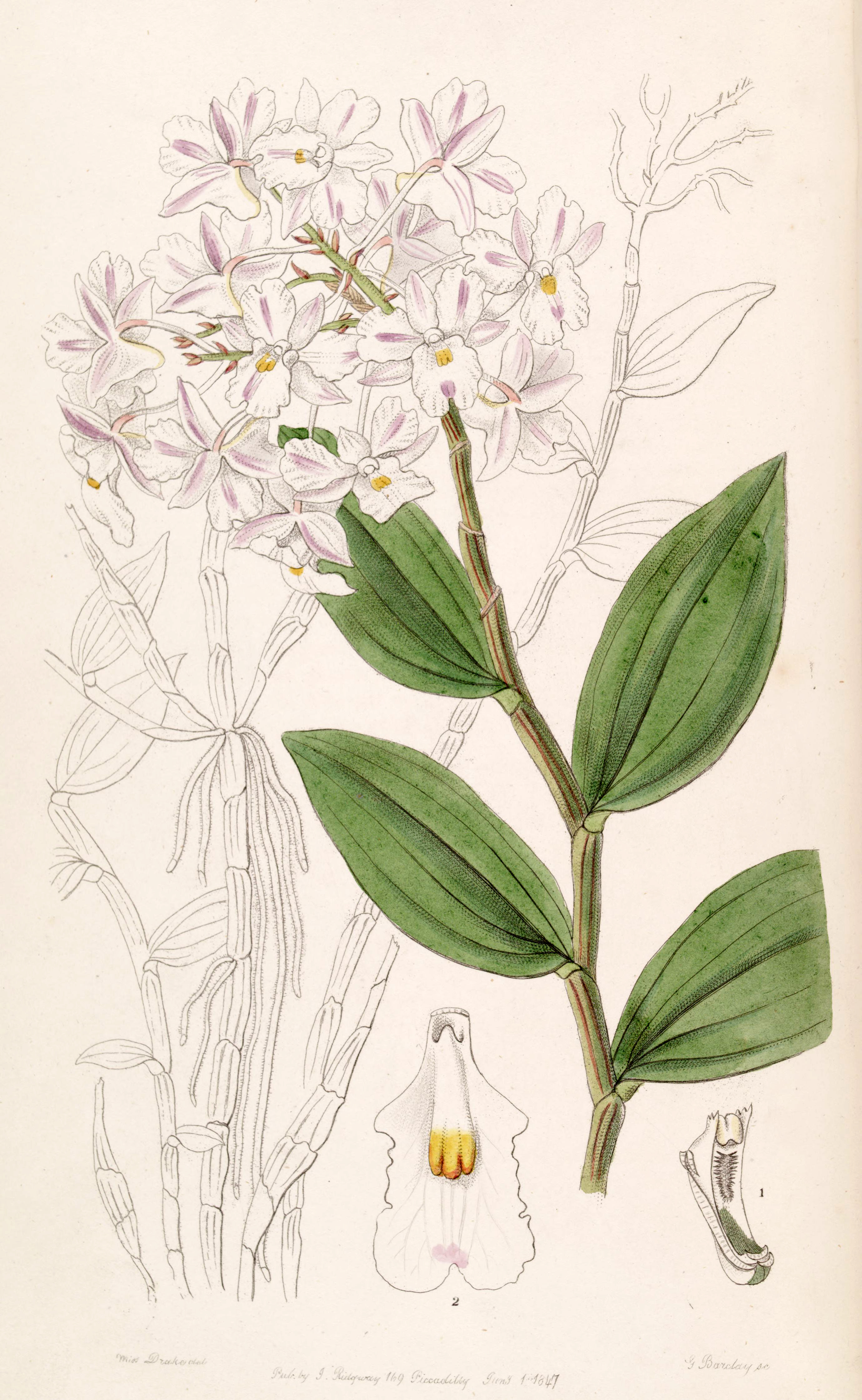
- 1847 illustration

Scientific classification
- Kingdom: Plantae
- Clade: Tracheophytes
- Clade: Angiosperms
- Clade: Monocots
- Order: Asparagales
- Family: Orchidaceae
- Subfamily: Epidendroideae
- Genus: Dendrobium
- Species: D. mutabile

Binomial name
- Dendrobium mutabile (Blume) Lindl.

Synonyms
- Anisopetala rigida (Blume) M.A.Clem.; Onychium mutabile Blume (basionym); Onychium rigidum Blume; Dendrobium firmum Steud.; Dendrobium sclerophyllum Lindl.; Dendrobium triadenium Lindl.; Callista mutabilis (Blume) Kuntze; Anisopetala mutabilis (Blume) M.A.Clem.

= Dendrobium mutabile =

Variable dendrobium

Species of orchid

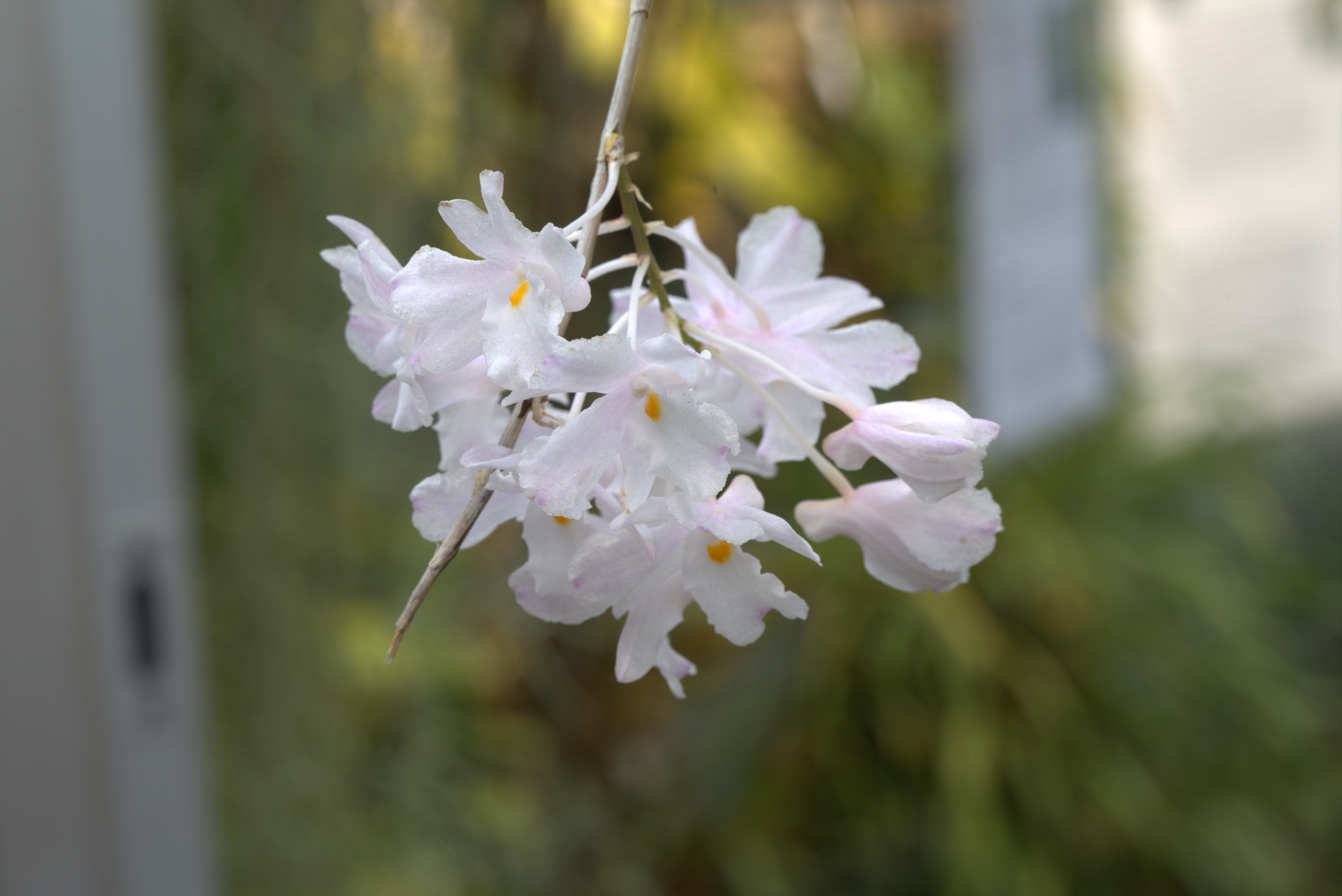
Dendrobium mutabile

Dendrobium mutabile, the variable dendrobium, is a species of orchid endemic to the islands of Java and Sumatra in Indonesia.
