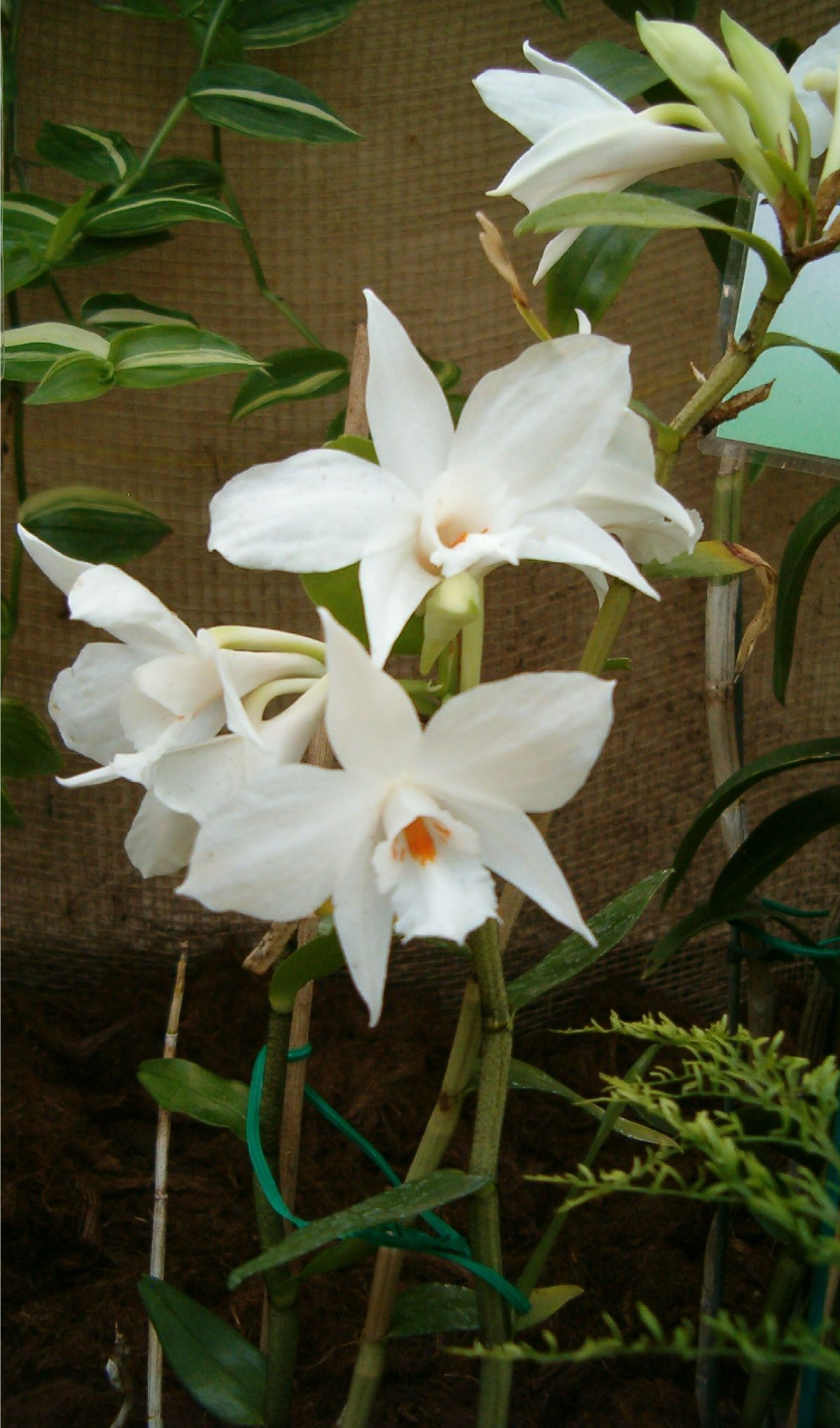

Scientific classification
- Kingdom: Plantae
- Clade: Tracheophytes
- Clade: Angiosperms
- Clade: Monocots
- Order: Asparagales
- Family: Orchidaceae
- Subfamily: Epidendroideae
- Genus: Dendrobium
- Species: D. infundibulum

Binomial name
- Dendrobium infundibulum Lindl.

Synonyms
- Callista infundibulum (Lindl.) Kuntze; Dendrobium jamesianum Rchb.f.; Dendrobium moulmeinense R.Warner & B.S.Williams

= Dendrobium infundibulum =

Small-funnel-lipped dendrobium

Species of orchid

Dendrobium infundibulum, the small-funnel-lipped dendrobium, is a species of orchid. It is native to northern Indochina (Laos, Thailand, Vietnam, Myanmar) and to neighboring parts of China and India (Yunnan and Assam).
