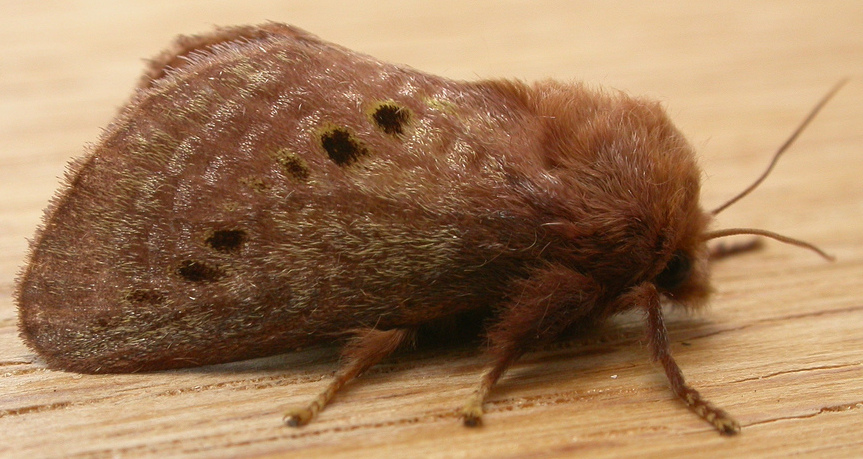

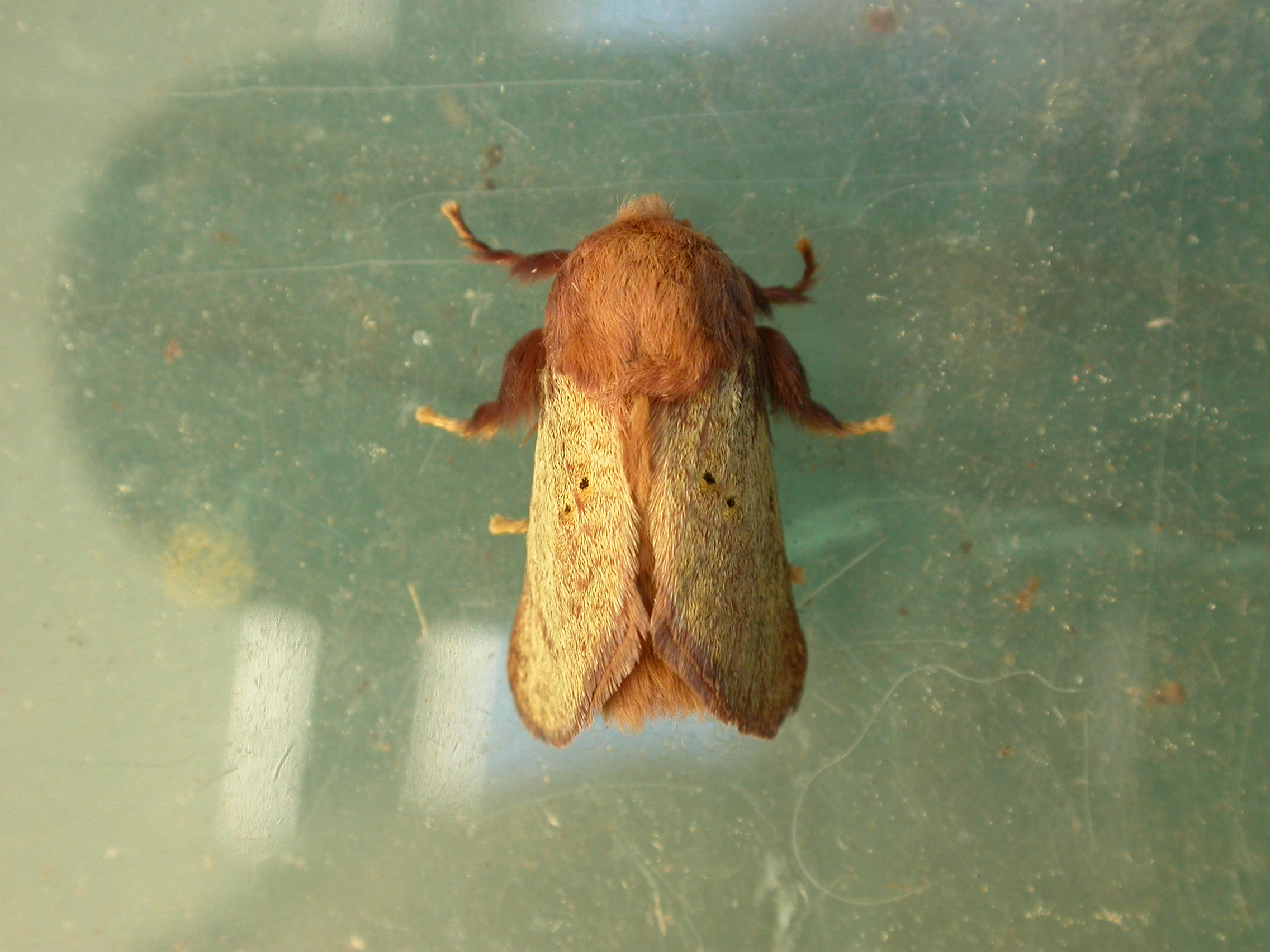

Scientific classification
- Domain: Eukaryota
- Kingdom: Animalia
- Phylum: Arthropoda
- Class: Insecta
- Order: Lepidoptera
- Family: Limacodidae
- Genus: Doratifera
- Species: D. quadriguttata

Binomial name
- Doratifera quadriguttata Walker, 1855

Synonyms
- Doratiophora lewini

= Doratifera quadriguttata =

Species of moth

Doratifera quadriguttata, the four-spotted cup moth, is a moth of the family Limacodidae. The species was first described by Francis Walker in 1855. It is found in Australia.

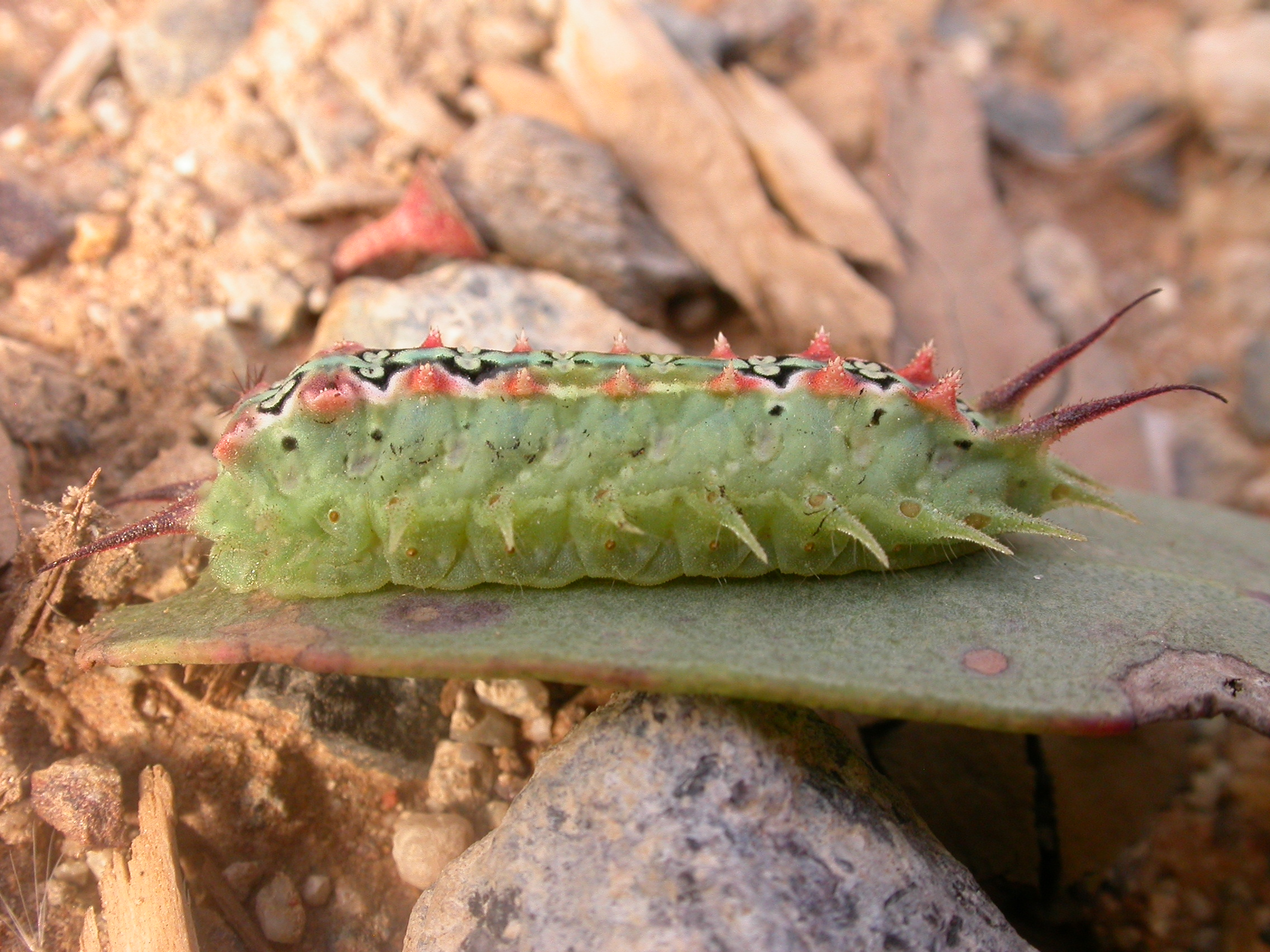
Caterpillar

The larvae feed on Tristaniopsis laurina, Lophostemon confertus, Rhizophora stylosa and Acacia and Eucalyptus species.
