= Calcarifera =

Scientific classification
- Kingdom: Animalia
- Phylum: Arthropoda
- Clade: Pancrustacea
- Class: Insecta
- Order: Lepidoptera
- Family: Limacodidae
- Genus: Calcarifera; Hering, 1931
- Species: C. ordinata

Binomial name
- Calcarifera ordinata (Butler, 1886)

Synonyms
- Doratiphora colligans

Species of moth

Calcarifera ordinata, the wattle cup caterpillar, is a moth of the family Limacodidae. It is widespread in northern Australia, south to Geraldton, Alice Springs and Brisbane. It is the only species in the genus Calcarifera.

The wingspan is about 30 mm.
