= Anaxidia lactea =

Scientific classification
- Kingdom: Animalia
- Phylum: Arthropoda
- Class: Insecta
- Order: Lepidoptera
- Family: Limacodidae
- Genus: Anaxidia
- Species: A. lactea

Binomial name
- Anaxidia lactea (Swinhoe, 1892)

Synonyms
- Ambaliha lactea Swinhoe, 1892

Species of moth

Anaxidia lactea is a moth belonging to the family Limacodidae and is found in Australia, including Western Australia.
