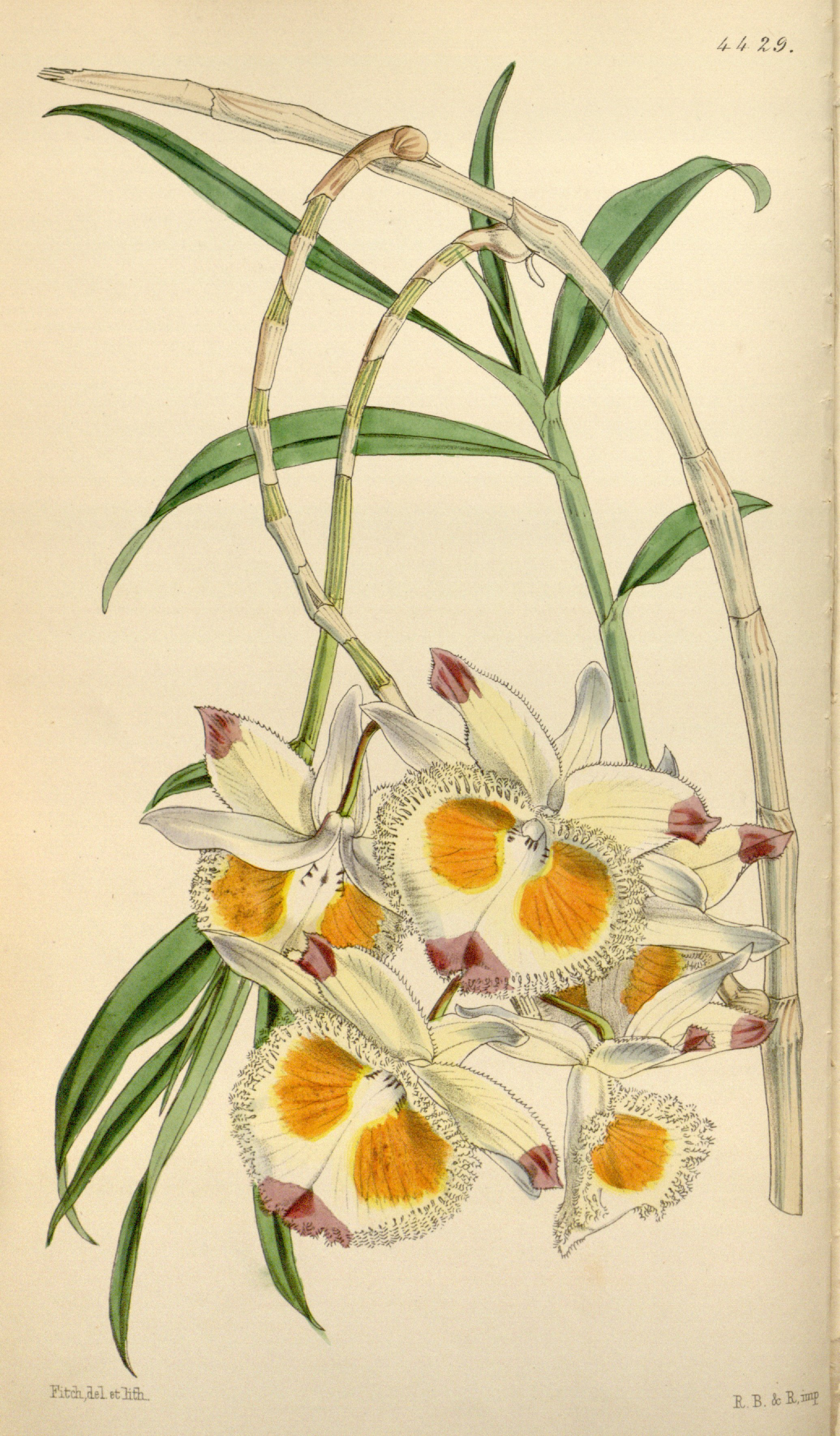
- 1849 illustration

Scientific classification
- Kingdom: Plantae
- Clade: Embryophytes
- Clade: Tracheophytes
- Clade: Spermatophytes
- Clade: Angiosperms
- Clade: Monocots
- Order: Asparagales
- Family: Orchidaceae
- Subfamily: Epidendroideae
- Genus: Dendrobium
- Species: D. devonianum

Binomial name
- Dendrobium devonianum Paxton

Synonyms
- Dendrobium pulchellum var. devonianum (Paxton) Rchb.f.; Callista devoniana (Paxton) Kuntze; Dendrobium pictum Griff. ex Lindl.; Dendrobium devonianum var. rhodoneurum Rchb.f.; Dendrobium moulmeinense C.S.P. Parish ex Hook.f.; Callista moulmeinensis (C.S.P. Parish ex Hook.f.) Kuntze

= Dendrobium devonianum =

Species of orchid

Dendrobium devonianum, or Devon's dendrobium, is a species of orchid. It is native to southern China (Guangxi, Guizhou, Tibet, Yunnan), the eastern Himalayas (Bhutan, Assam), and northern Indochina (Myanmar, Thailand, Laos, Vietnam). It is an epiphyte that grows on tree trunks in mountain forests.

== Description ==
Dendrobium devonianum is an orchid and its structure is based in three outer sepals, three inner petals, and a column formed by fused stamens and pistils. This species exhibits distinctive floral characteristics that includes a white labellum with a compound fringes margin and yellow spots on either side. The labellum's surface is densely populated with numerous conical and semicircular papillae, while the mesochile and epichile regions display jagged, branched epidermal cell structures and multicellular trichomes.

== Taxonomy ==
From a study based on the construction of the phylogenomic tree using homologous genes from Dendrobium devonianum and 15 other plant species it was determined that Dendrobium devonianum clustered with Dendrobium catenatum, Dendrobium chrysotoxum, Dendrobium huoshanense and Dendrobium nobile. The divergence time between Dendrobium devonianum and Dendrobium nobile was estimated at 18.79 million years ago (Mya).

== Distribution and habitat ==
Dendrobium devonianum is listed as an endangered species (EN) on the IUCN Red List of Threatened Species. This orchid is valued as ornamental and medicinal plant in China from over a century.

== Gallery of illustrations ==
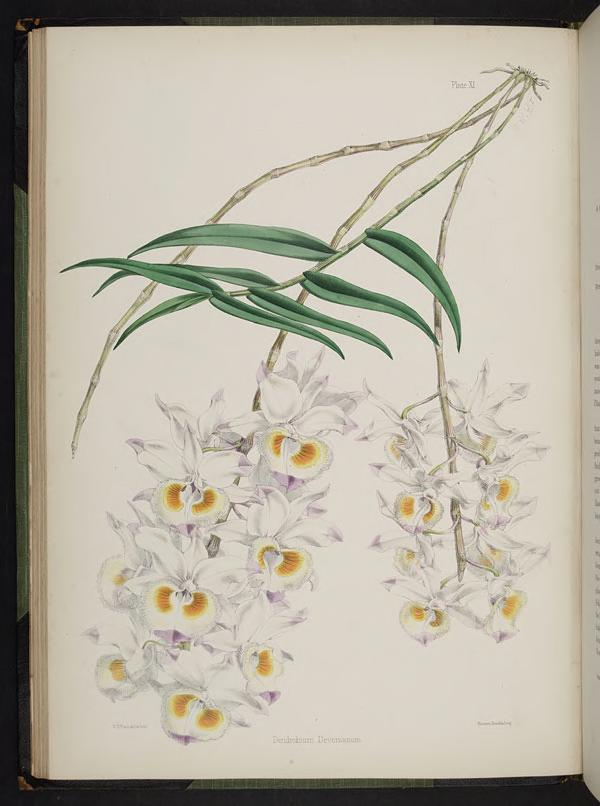

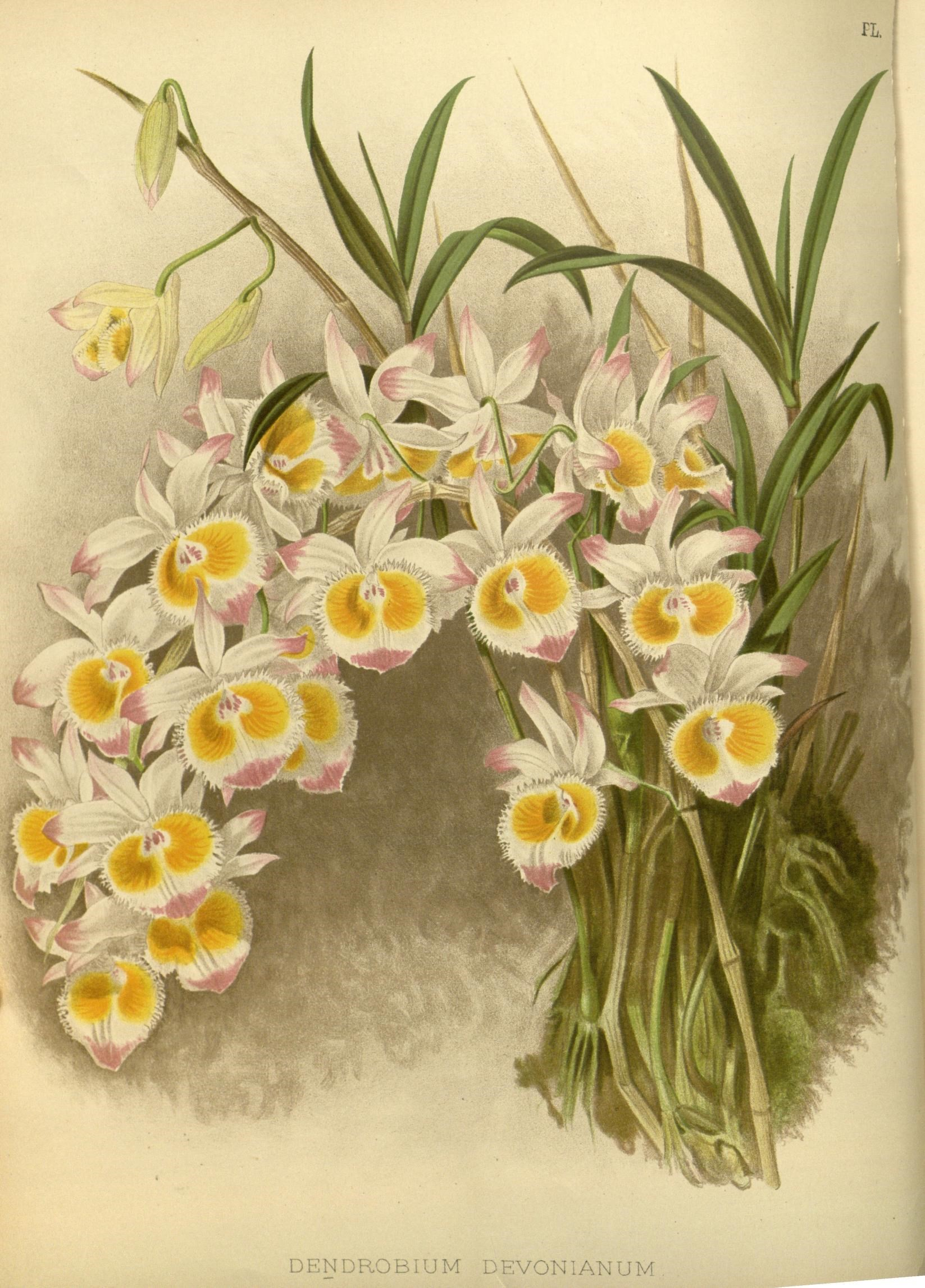

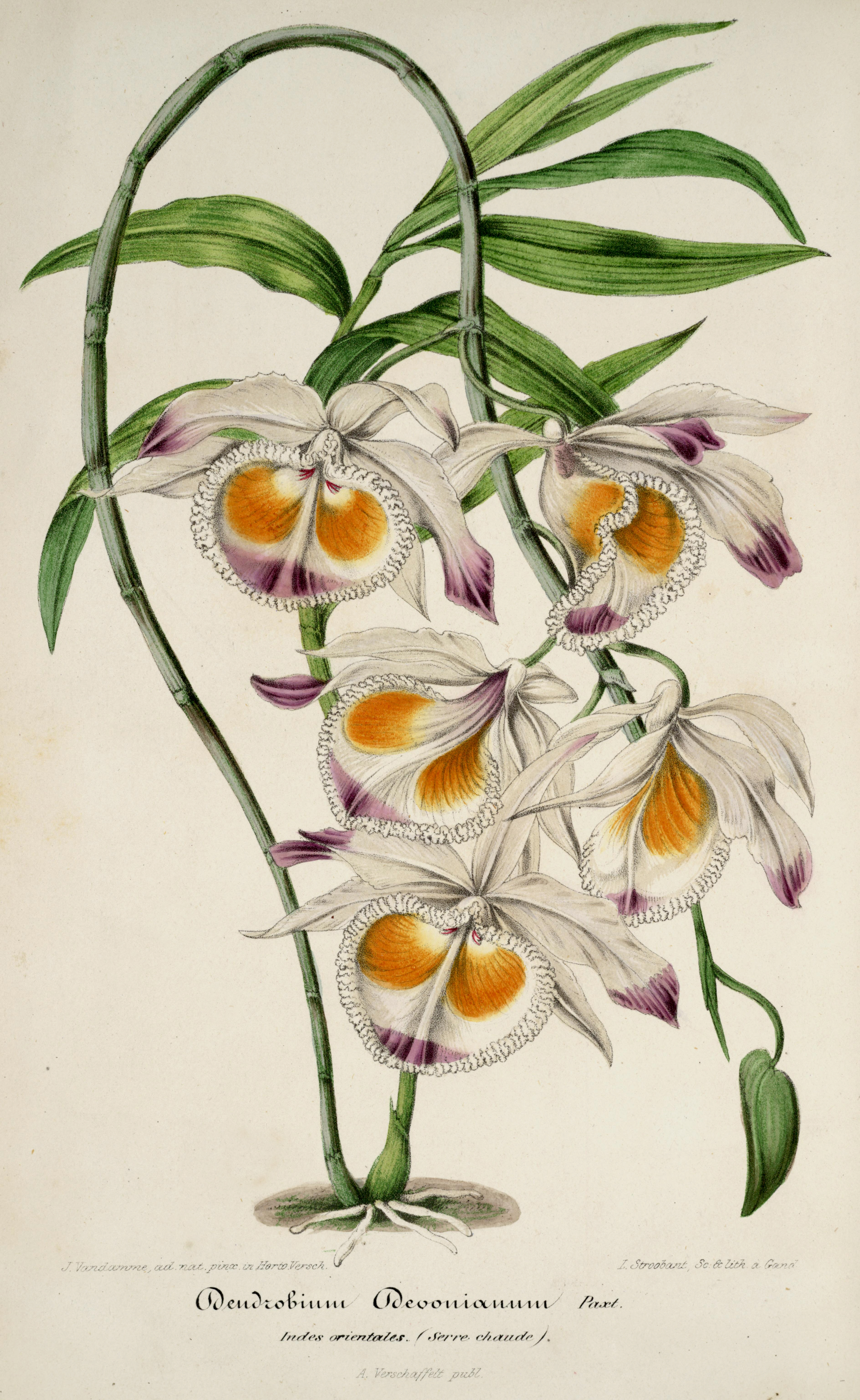
