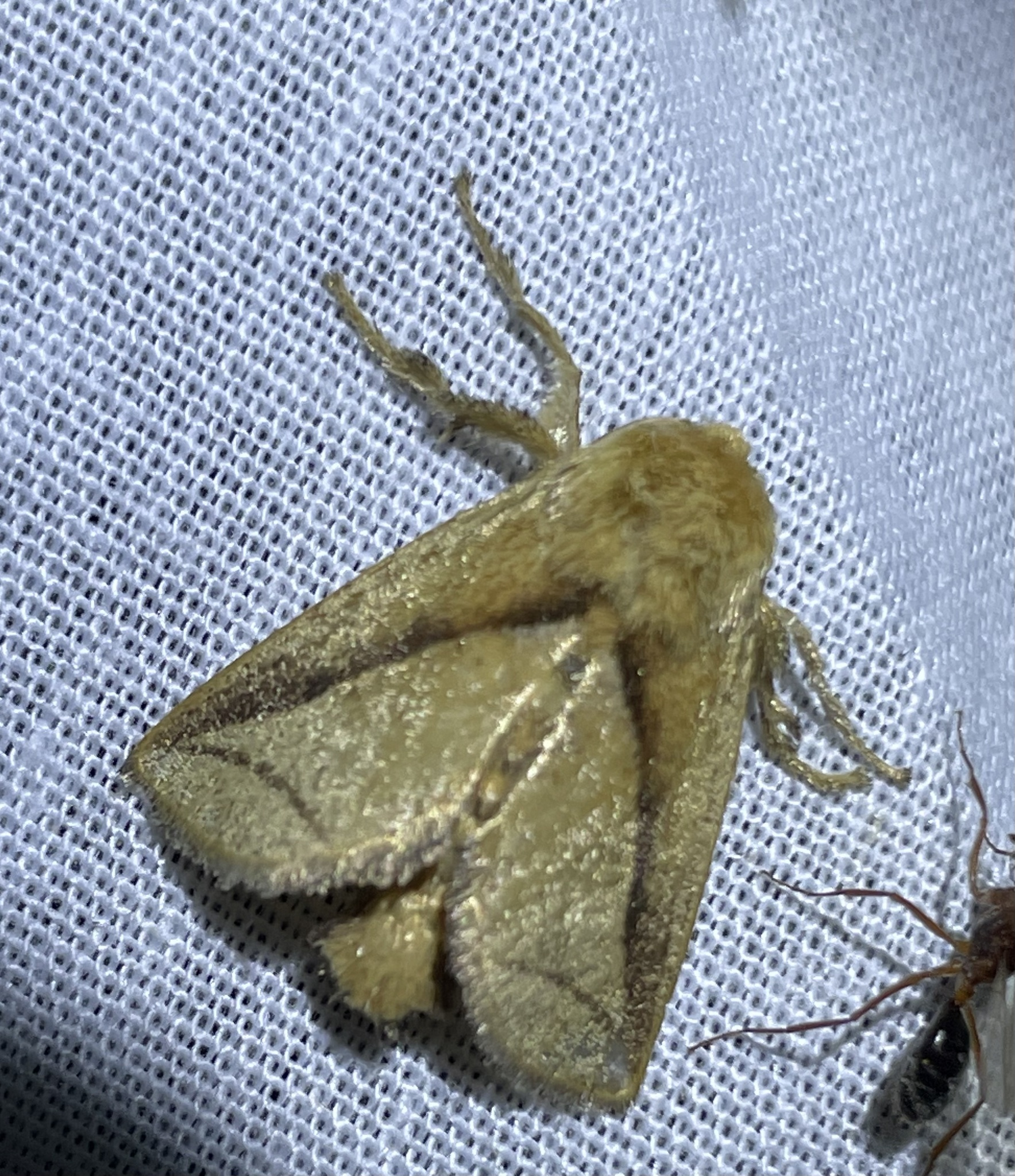
- Anaxidia lozogramma
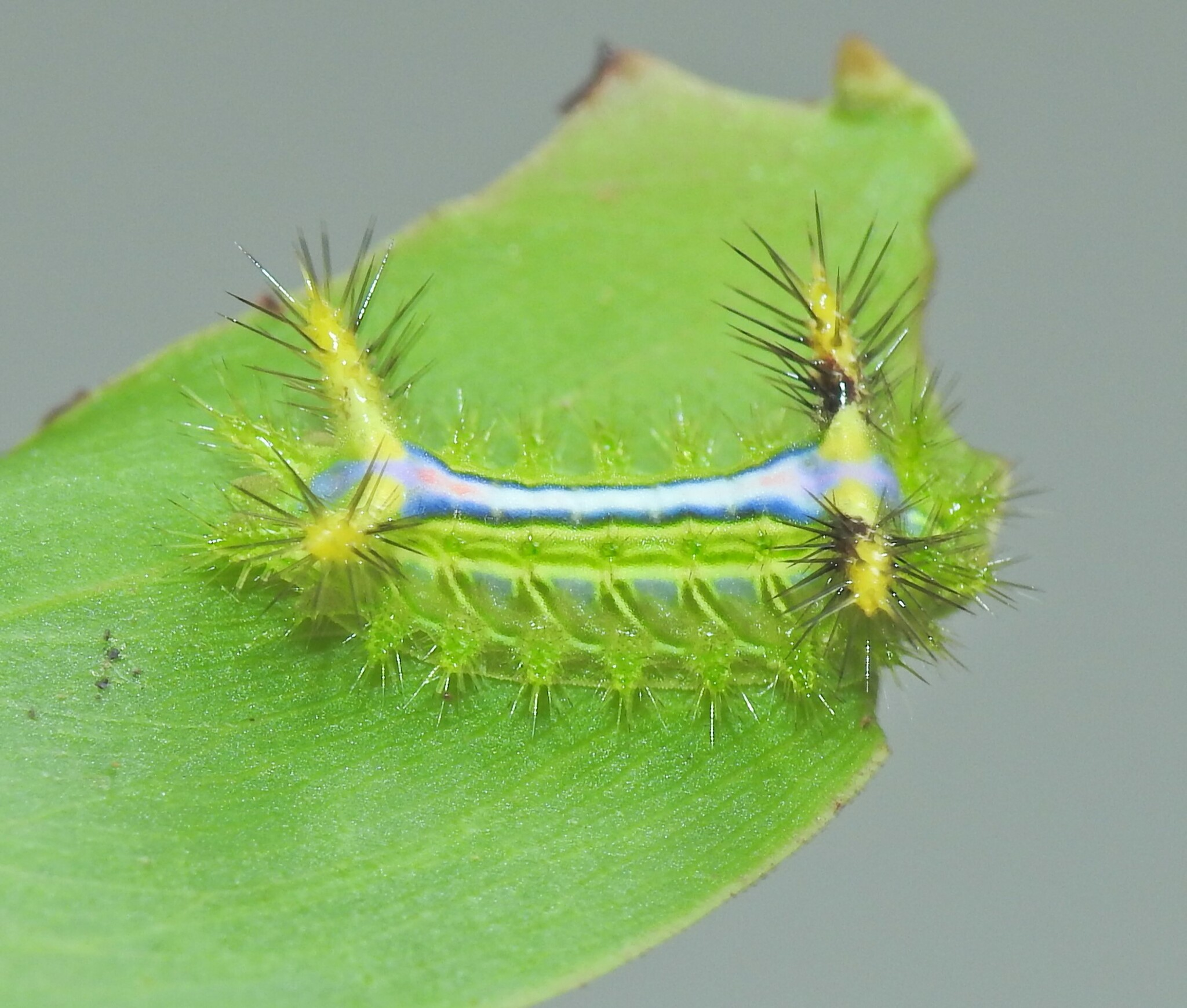
- Larval stage

Scientific classification
- Kingdom: Animalia
- Phylum: Arthropoda
- Class: Insecta
- Order: Lepidoptera
- Family: Limacodidae
- Genus: Anaxidia
- Species: A. lozogramma

Binomial name
- Anaxidia lozogramma (Turner, 1902)

Synonyms
- Ambaliha lozogramma Turner, 1902

= Anaxidia lozogramma =

Species of moth

Anaxidia lozogramma is a moth of the family Limacodidae found in Australia, in coastal and subcoastal areas from the Atherton tableland to Eungella in northern Queensland and from southern Queensland to Mount Keira in New South Wales.

The larvae feed on the foliage of Macadamia, Dodonaea triquetra and Camellia.
