= Eduardo Quisumbing =

Filipino botanist

Eduardo A. Quisumbing ONS
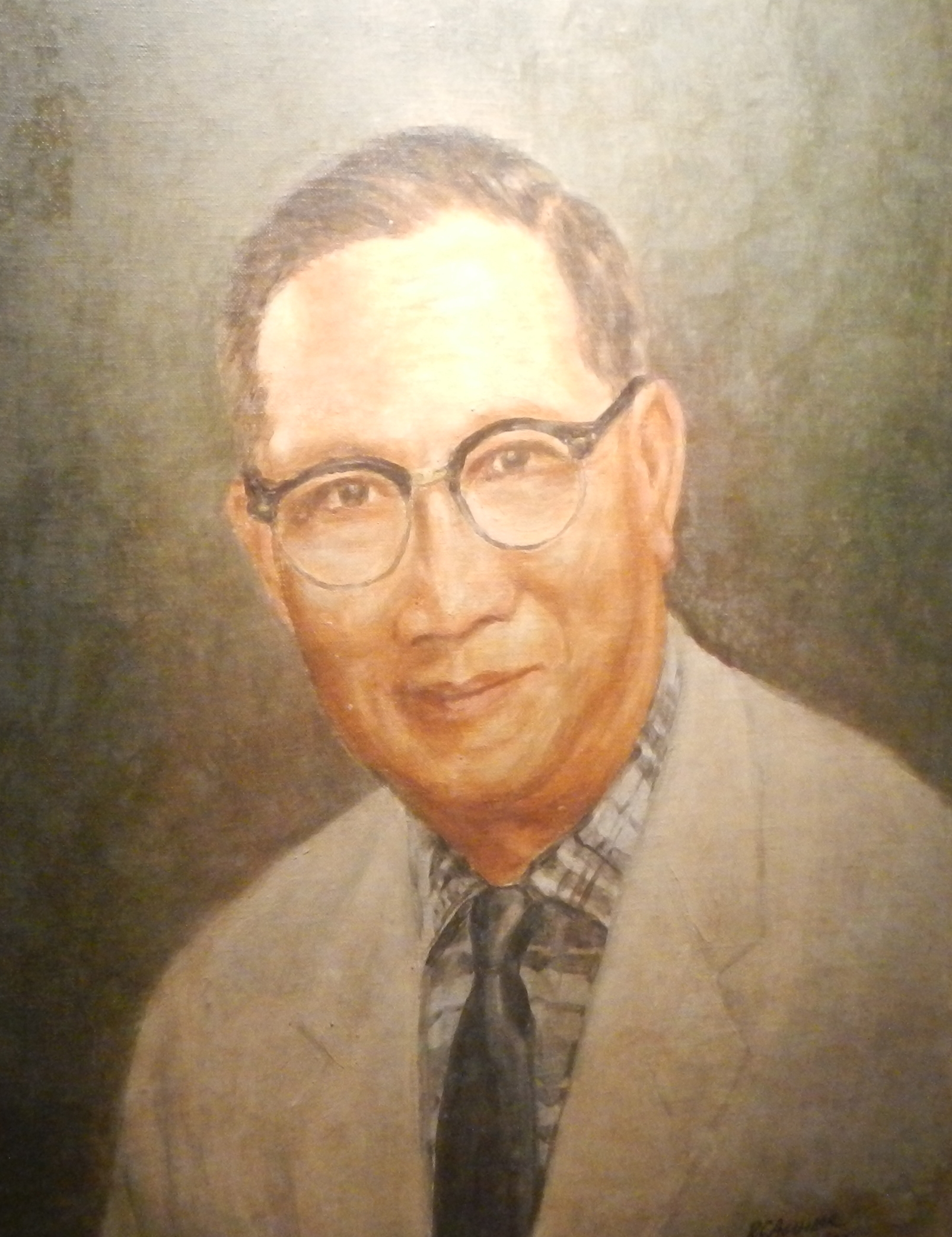
- Portrait of Eduardo Quisumbing in the National Museum of Natural History
- Born: November 24, 1895; Santa Cruz, Laguna, Captaincy General of the Philippines
- Died: August 23, 1986 (aged 90); Quezon City, Philippines
- Education: University of the Philippines Los Baños; University of Chicago
- Occupation: Plant Taxonomist
- Spouses: Basilia Lim; Trinidad Tanchoco
- Children: 4
- Relatives: Vicente Lim (brother-in-law)
- Awards: Order of National Scientists of the Philippines (1980)

Eduardo Quisumbíng y Argüelles (Filipino: Eduardo Argüelles Quisumbing; November 24, 1895 – August 23, 1986) was a Filipino biologist and leading authority of plants in the Philippines.

== Education ==
He earned his BSA in Biology at the University of the Philippines Los Baños in 1918, his MS in botany at the same university in 1921, and Ph.D. in plant taxonomy, systematics and morphology at the University of Chicago in 1923.

== Career ==
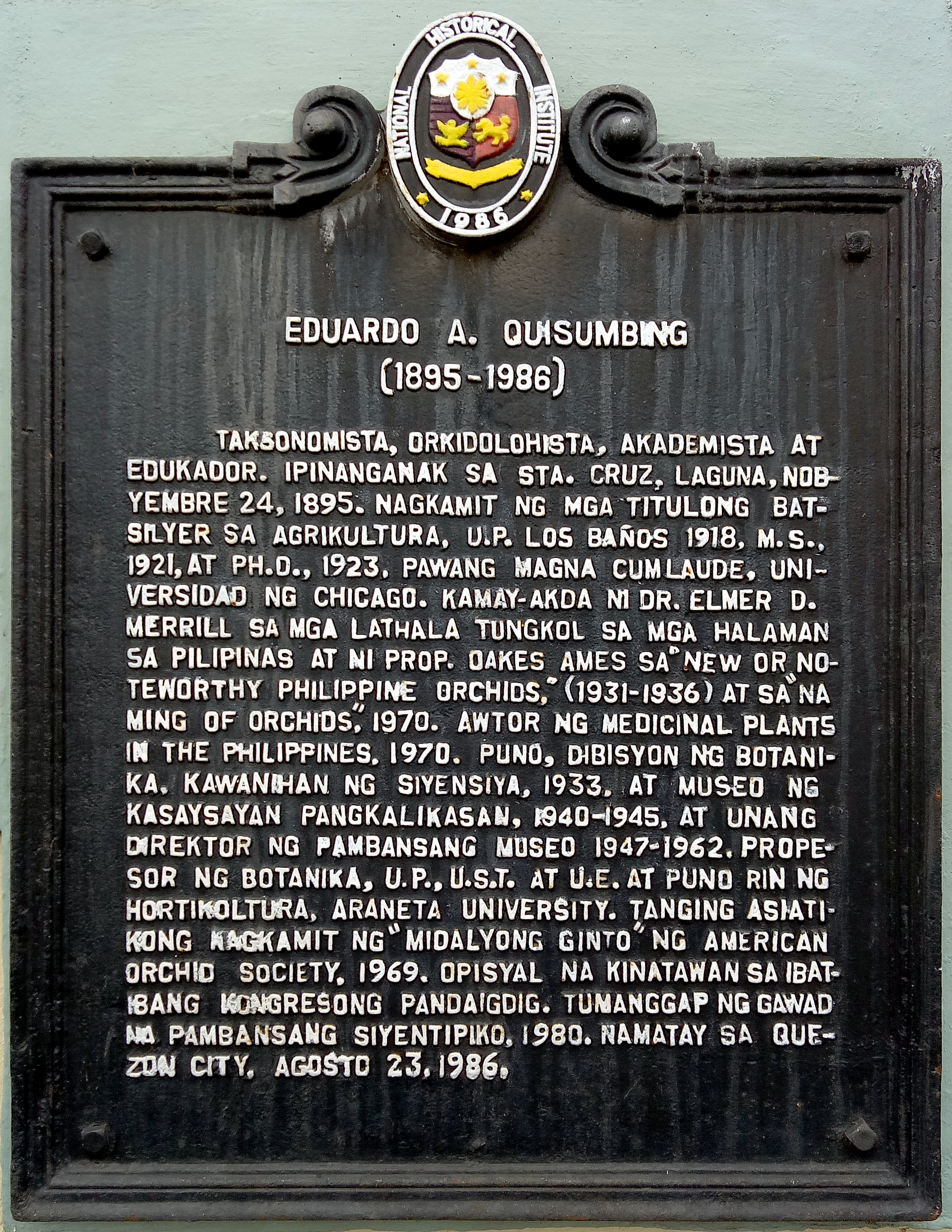
National historical marker installed in 1986 in Pasay, Metro Manila

From 1920 to 1926 he was attached to the College of Agriculture in U.P., and from 1926 to 1928 to the University of California, Berkeley; in 1928 appointed systematic botanist and since February 1934 acting chief of the Natural Museum Division of the Bureau of Science, Manila, now director of the National Museum. When assigned to the U.S. Navy in Guiuan, at the southern tip of Samar, made collections in that region. He retired as director in November 1961, and was for some following years attached to the Araneta University. Quisumbing undertook restoration of the Herbarium, which was completely destroyed during the war.

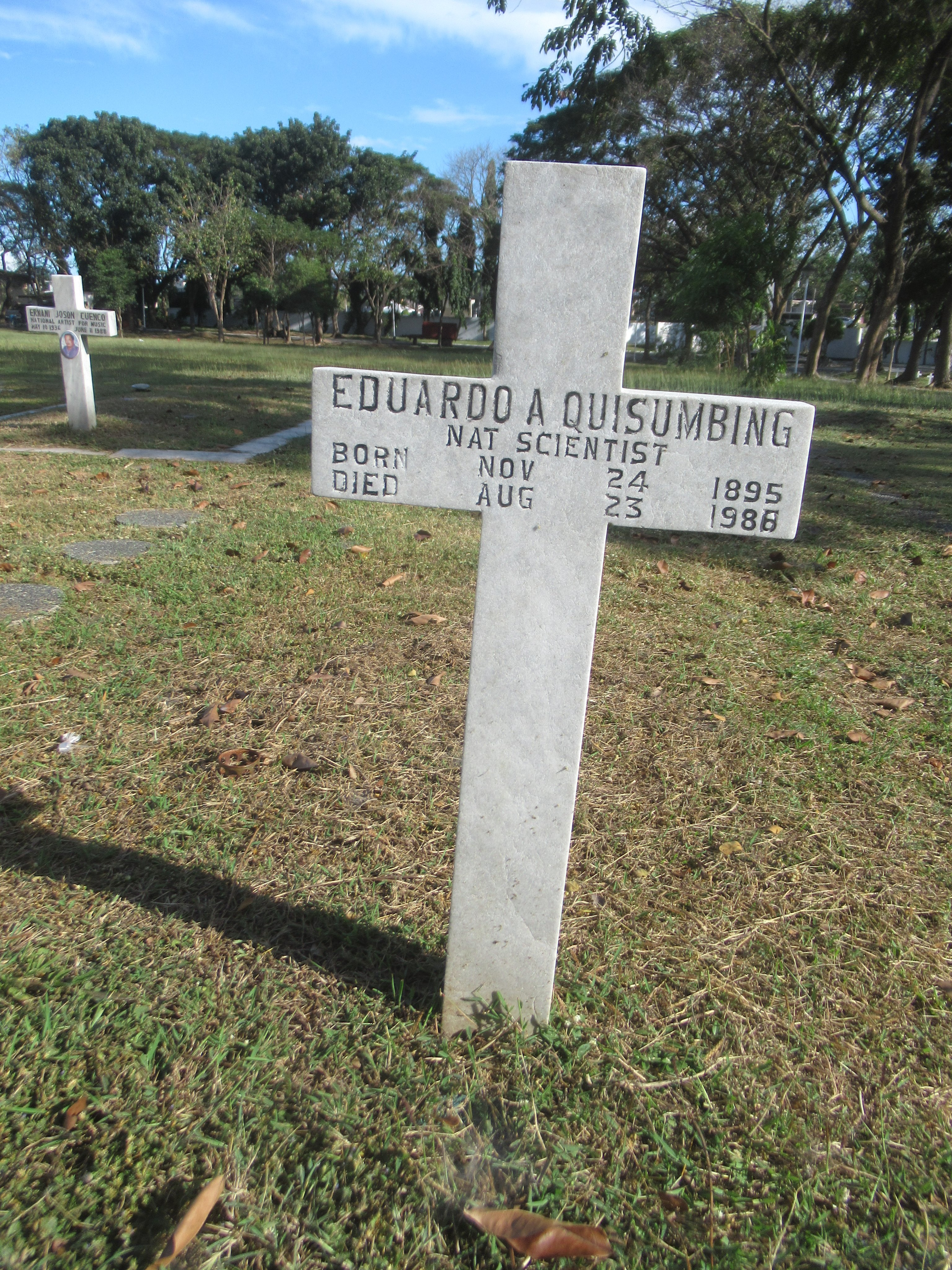
Quisumbing's grave at the Libingan ng mga Bayani.

Quisumbing was author of taxonomic and morphological papers, many of which deal with orchids, including 'Medicinal plants in the Philippines' (Manila 1951). Saccolabium quisumbingii has been named in his honour. He was recipient of the Distinguished Service Star (1954) for outstanding contribution to the field of systematic botany; Diploma of Merit on Orchidology and Fellow Gold Medal, Malaysian Orchid Society (1966); Gold Medal, American Orchid Society (1969), and 1975 PhilAAS Most Outstanding Award.

== See also ==
- Camellus
