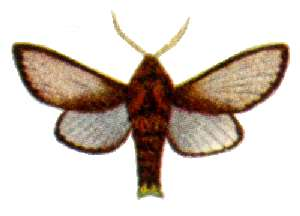

Scientific classification
- Kingdom: Animalia
- Phylum: Arthropoda
- Clade: Pancrustacea
- Class: Insecta
- Order: Lepidoptera
- Family: Limacodidae
- Genus: Doratifera
- Species: D. oxleyi

Binomial name
- Doratifera oxleyi (Newman, 1855)

Synonyms
- Anapaea confusa

= Doratifera oxleyi =

Species of moth

Doratifera oxleyi, the painted cup moth, is a moth of the family Limacodidae. The species was first described by Newman in 1855. An Australian moth, it is found in New South Wales and Victoria, as well as South Australia and Tasmania.

The wingspan is about 50 mm for females and 20 mm for males.

Females lay eggs in clusters of 40 and cover with body hairs from their abdomen. Eggs take 12 days to hatched.

The larvae feed on Eucalyptus species. Like most other members of the Limacodidae family, they are covered with poisonous hairs.
