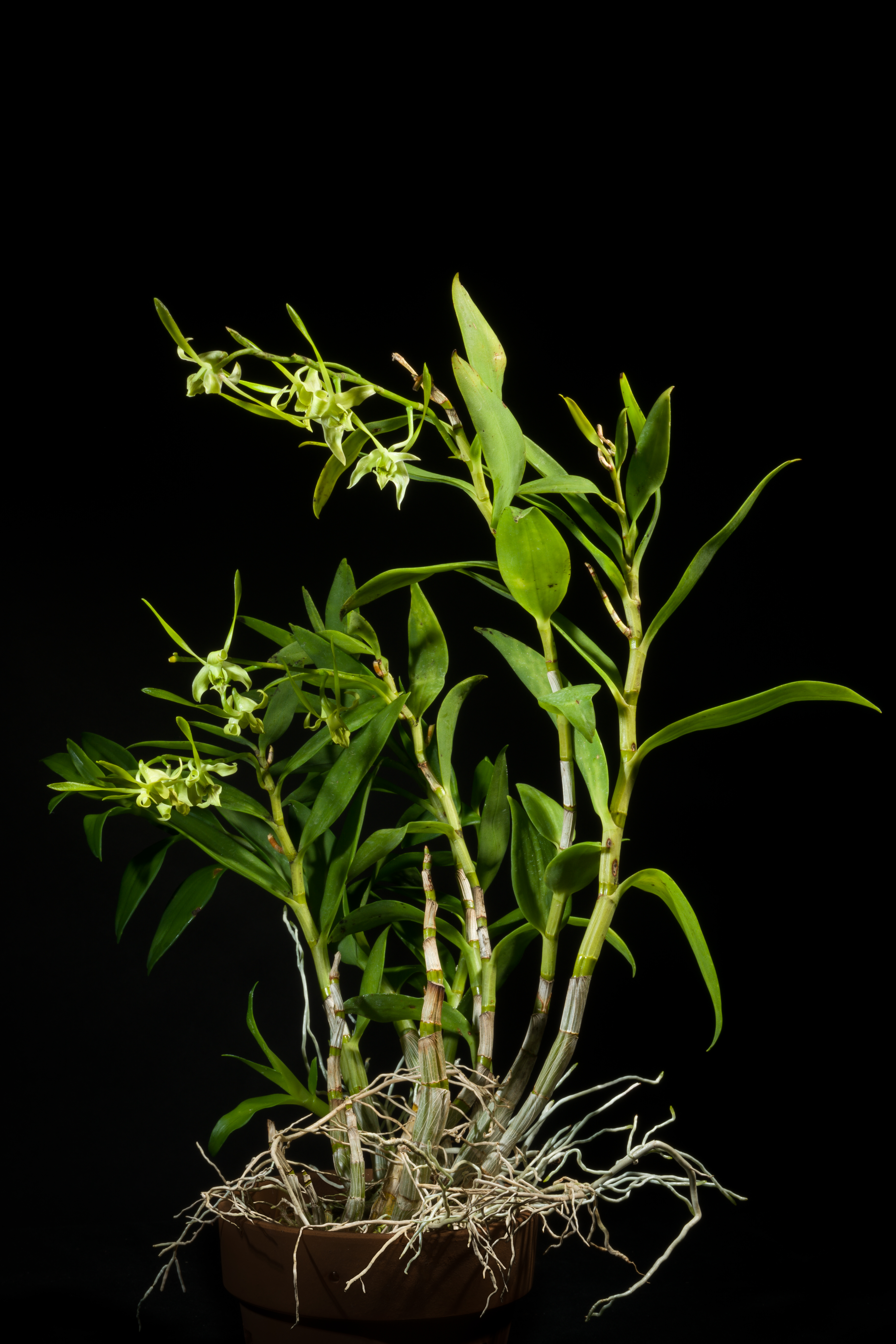
- Dendrobium archipelagense

Scientific classification
- Kingdom: Plantae
- Clade: Tracheophytes
- Clade: Angiosperms
- Clade: Monocots
- Order: Asparagales
- Family: Orchidaceae
- Subfamily: Epidendroideae
- Genus: Dendrobium
- Section: Dendrobium sect. Spatulata; Lindl. 1843

Type species
- Dendrobium antennatum

Species
- See text

Synonyms
- List: Dendrobium section Antennata Rchb.f 1886; Cepobaculum M A Clem & D L Jones 2002; Ceratobium [Lindl] M A Clem & D L Jones 2002; Dendrobium section Ceratobium Lindley 1851; Dendrobium section Ceratobium; Dendrobium subsection Minacia Kraenzl 1910; Dendrobium section Ceratobium; Dendrobium section Mirabeliana Kraenzl 1910; Dendrobium section Ceratobium; Dendrobium subsection Taurina Kraenzl 1910; Dendrobium section Ceratobium; Dendrobium subsection Undulata Kraenzl 1910; Durabaculum M A Clem & D L Jones 2002; Dendrobium section Eudendrobium; Dendrobium subsection Antennatum Rchb.f ex Pfitzer 1889; Dendrobium section Stachyobium; Dendrobium subsection Antennata Rchb.f 1878; Dendrobium section Strebloceras Schltr 1905; Dendrobium section Tokai Kraenzl 1910

= Dendrobium sect. Spatulata =

Subgenus of flowering plants

Dendrobium section Spatulata is a section of the genus Dendrobium.

== Description ==
Plants in this section have a erect cane like pseudobulbs with two leaves, blooming with a multi-flower inflorescence with twisted petals and a tri lobed lip.

== Distribution ==
Plants from this section are found in Java and the Philippines to Australia and the Pacific Islands with the greatest concentration in New Guinea. Most of the species can be found at lower elevation close to sea level.

== Species ==
Dendrobium section Spatulata comprises the following species:

Image	Name	Distribution	Elevation (m)
	Dendrobium angusticaule P.J.Spence 2016	Papua New Guinea (Mussau Island)	
	Dendrobium antennatum Lindley 1843	Queensland Australia, Papua and New Guinea, the Solomon Islands and surrounding islands	0–1,200 metres (0–3,937 ft)
	Dendrobium archipelagense Howcroft & W.N.Takeuchi 2002	Bismark Archipelago	0–250 metres (0–820 ft)
	Dendrobium aries J.J.Sm. 1914	western New Guinea	0 metres (0 ft)
	Dendrobium bicaudatum Reinw. ex Lindl. 1859	Mollucas, Sulawesi and the Philippines	0–1,000 metres (0–3,281 ft)
	Dendrobium brillianum Ormerod & Cavestro 2005	Malesia (Papua New Guinea)	
	Dendrobium burkeanum Ormerod 2009	Indonesia	
	Dendrobium busuangense Ames 1920	Philippines (Busuang Island )	300 metres (980 ft)
	Dendrobium calophyllum Rchb.f. 1870	Java, Lesser Sunda Islands and the Moluccas	0 metres (0 ft)
	Dendrobium canaliculatum R. Brown 1810	Australia and New Guinea	0–500 metres (0–1,640 ft)
	Dendrobium capra J.J. Sm. 1910	Lesser Sunda Islands and eastern Java	
	Dendrobium carronii Lavarack & P.J. Cribb 1983	Australia and Papua and New Guinea	0–500 metres (0–1,640 ft)
	Dendrobium cochliodes Schltr. 1912	Papua and New Guinea and Irian Jaya	400–1,600 metres (1,300–5,200 ft)
	Dendrobium conanthum Schltr. 1912	New Guinea, New Caledonia, the Philippines and Vanuatu	0–800 metres (0–2,625 ft)
	Dendrobium crispilinguum P.J.Cribb 1980	Papua New Guinea	1,100–1,600 metres (3,600–5,200 ft)
	Dendrobium dedeksantosoi D.S.Santoso 2022	Maluku Islands	
	Dendrobium devosianum J.J.Sm. 1934	western New Guinea	
	Dendrobium discolor Lindley 1841	Australia	0–550 metres (0–1,804 ft)
	Dendrobium enigmaticum Ormerod 2009	Papua New Guinea	
	Dendrobium gouldii Rchb. f. 1867	Papua and New Guinea and the Solomon Islands	0–700 metres (0–2,297 ft)
	Dendrobium hamiferum P.J.Cribb 1981	New Guinea	1,100–1,800 metres (3,600–5,900 ft)
	Dendrobium helix P.J. Cribb 1980	New Guinea	0–150 metres (0–492 ft)
	Dendrobium irinae Ormerod 2017	New Guinea	
	Dendrobium jennyanum Kraenzl. 1896	New Guinea	
	Dendrobium johannis Rchb.f 1865	Australia and Papua and New Guinea	
	Dendrobium lasianthera J.J. Sm 1932	Papua and New Guinea	0–100 metres (0–328 ft)
	Dendrobium laxiflorum J.J.Sm. 1932	Moluccas	
	Dendrobium leporinum J.J.Sm. 1909	the Mouluccas and western New Guinea	
	Dendrobium lineale Rolfe 1889	New Guinea	0–800 metres (0–2,625 ft)
	Dendrobium macranthum A.Rich.1834	New Caledonia, Santa Cruz Islands, Vanuatu and Wallis & Futna	0–500 metres (0–1,640 ft)
	Dendrobium magistratus P.J. Cribb 1981	Papua and New Guinea	1,300–1,500 metres (4,300–4,900 ft)
	Dendrobium militare P.J.Cribb 1996	Ternate of the Moluccas Islands	1,500 metres (4,900 ft)
	Dendrobium mirbelianum Gaudich. 1829	Queensland Australia, Solomon Islands and Papua and New Guinea	0–650 metres (0–2,133 ft)
	Dendrobium mussauense Ormerod 1997	The Bismark Archipelago to the north of New Guinea	
	Dendrobium odoardoi Kraenzl. 1910	New Guinea.	
	Dendrobium nindii W. Hill 1874	northeastern Australia and sporadically in New Guinea	0–200 metres (0–656 ft)
	Dendrobium parnatanum Cavestro 2002	Western New Guinea	200 metres (660 ft)
	Dendrobium percnanthum Rchb.f. 1886	Moluccas	
	Dendrobium pseudoconanthum J.J.Sm. 1926	Sulawesi	
	Dendrobium racieanum Cavestro 2003	western New Guinea	250 metres (820 ft)
	Dendrobium rennellii P.J.Cribb 1983	Solomon Islands	0–100 metres (0–328 ft)
	Dendrobium samoense P.J.Cribb 1983	Samoa	0–600 metres (0–1,969 ft)
	Dendrobium schulleri J.J.Sm. 1914	Papua (Noemfoor Island).	
	Dendrobium soriense Howcroft 1996	Papua New Guinea	
	Dendrobium stockelbuschii Schettler 2016	eastern Indonesia	
	Dendrobium stratiotes Rchb. f.1886	western New Guinea, the Moluccas [Halmaheira and Morotai], the Sunda Islands and Sulawesi	
	Dendrobium strebloceras Rchb.f 1886	Malaysian archipelago	
	Dendrobium strepsiceros J.J. Sm. 1912	the Moluccas and New Guinea	0–50 metres (0–164 ft)
	Dendrobium sutiknoi P.O'Byrne 2005	New Guinea	
	Dendrobium sylvanum Rchb. f. 1877	Papua New Guinea, New Ireland, Bouganville and the Solomons	0–80 metres (0–262 ft)
	Dendrobium tangerinum P.J. Cribb 1980	New Guinea	0–1,250 metres (0–4,101 ft)
	Dendrobium taurinum Lindl. 1843	Philippines	0–300 metres (0–984 ft)
	Dendrobium taurulinum J.J.Sm. 1920	Seram of the Moluccas	
	Dendrobium tokai Rchb.f. 1865	Fiji and Tonga	0–800 metres (0–2,625 ft)
	Dendrobium trilamellatum J.J.Sm. 1908	southern New Guinea and in northern Australia	
	Dendrobium violaceoflavens J.J. Sm. 1929	western New Guinea	0 metres (0 ft)
	Dendrobium wulaiense Howcroft 1981	Papua and New Guinea	

== Natural hybrids ==
Image	Name	Parentage	Distribution
	Dendrobium × andersonianum F.M.Bailey	Dendrobium antennatum × Dendrobium lineale	New Guinea
	Dendrobium × fleischeri J.J.Sm. 1913	Dendrobium antennatum × Dendrobium biggibum	New Guinea
