= Charles-François Brisseau de Mirbel =

French botanist and politician (1776–1854)

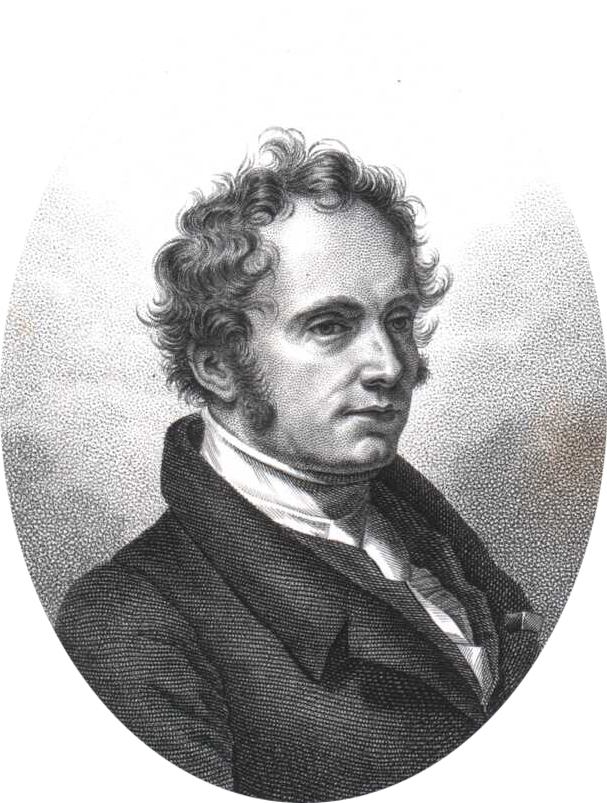
- Portrait of Charles-François Brisseau de Mirbel
- Born: 27 March 1776; Paris
- Died: 12 September 1854 (aged 78); Champerret, Paris
- Known for: cytology
- Scientific career
- Fields: botanist and politician
- Author abbrev. (botany): Mirb.

Charles-François Brisseau de Mirbel (27 March 1776 – 12 September 1854) was a French botanist and politician. He was a founder of the science of plant cytology.

A native Parisian, at the age of twenty, he became an assistant-naturalist with the French National Museum of Natural History. While there he began to examine plant tissue under a microscope.

In 1802, Mirbel published his treatise Traité d'anatomie et de physiologie végétale which established his position as a founder of cytology, plant histology and plant physiology in France. He proposed that all plant tissue is modified from parenchyma (supporting tissue). His observation, in 1809, that each plant cell is contained in a continuous membrane, remains a central contribution to cytology.

In 1803, Mirbel obtained the post of superintendent of the gardens of Napoleon's Château de Malmaison. There he studied and published on structure of plant tissue and the development of plant organs. He also studied and described the genus Marchantia of liverworts. His 1802 treatise and these publications enabled him, in 1808, to join the French Academy of Sciences and to become the chair of the botany department of the Sorbonne. His combined tissue studies were published in 1815 as Eléments de physiologie végétale et de botanique.

With the Bourbon Restoration, Mirbel's friend Élie, duc Decazes, then Minister of Interior, offered him the post of Secretary General. But the fall of the government in 1829, marked the end of Mirbel's political career, and he returned to a position with the National Museum of Natural History as head of the Jardin des Plantes in Paris, and eventually became the Director of Culture (chaire de culture) for the museum. Mirbel was elected a foreign member of the British Royal Society of London in 1837.

In 1823, Mirbel married Lizinska Aimée Zoé Rue, a French painter of miniatures. He died in Champerret, France in 1854. The plant genus Mirbelia and the orchid Dendrobium mirbelianum are named in his honor.

== Selected works ==
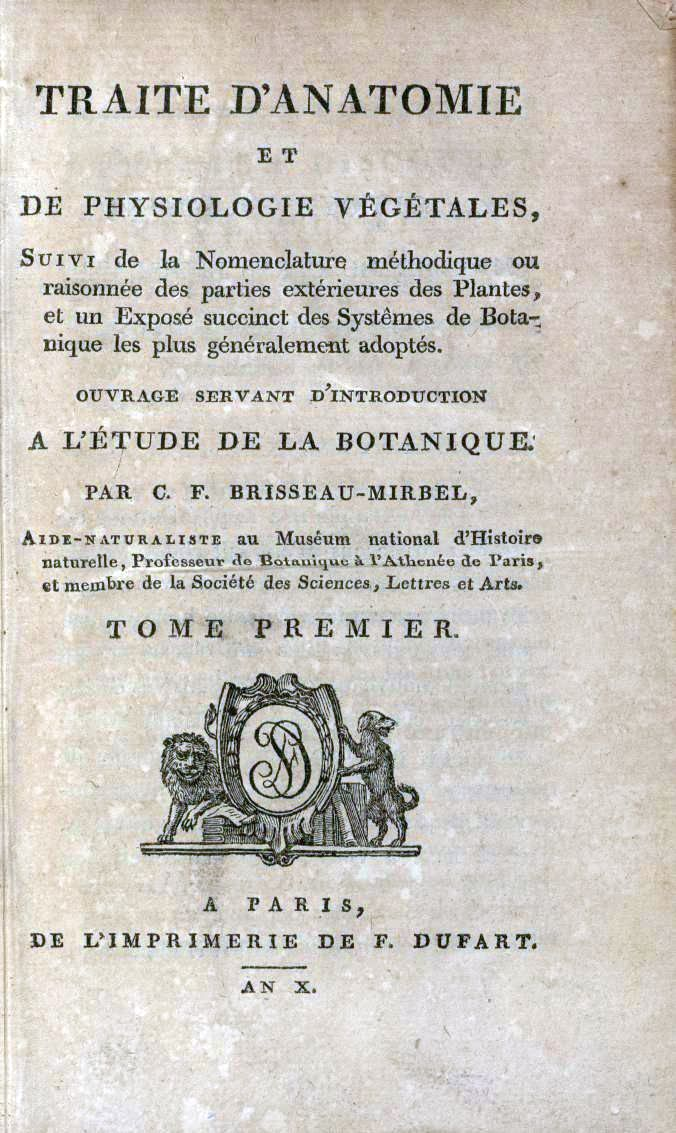
Traité d'anatomie et de physiologie végétales, 1801–1802

- Traité d'anatomie et de physiologie végétales (in French). Paris: François Dufart. 1801–1802.
- Traité d'anatomie et de physiologie végétale, 1802
- Histoire naturelle, générale et particulière de plantes, 1802–1806
- Exposition de la théorie de l'organisation végétale, 1809
- Éléments de physiologie végétale et de botanique, 1815
