= Dendrobium samoense =

Conservation status
- Near Threatened (IUCN 3.1)

Scientific classification
- Kingdom: Plantae
- Clade: Tracheophytes
- Clade: Angiosperms
- Clade: Monocots
- Order: Asparagales
- Family: Orchidaceae
- Subfamily: Epidendroideae
- Genus: Dendrobium
- Species: D. samoense

Binomial name
- Dendrobium samoense P.J.Cribb

Synonyms
- Durabaculum samoense (P.J.Cribb) M.A.Clem. & D.L.Jones

Species of flowering plant

Dendrobium samoense, the Samoan dendrobium, is a species of flower in the Orchidaceae family. It is endemic to Samoa, and is currently listed on the IUCN Red List as Near Threatened. This medium-sized orchid is a warm-weather epiphyte that grows on trees in the lowland and mountain forests of Samoa, from sea level up to 600 metres. It features clusters of leafy, cane-like stems with thick, oval leaves arranged in two neat rows. When it blooms, the plant produces a straight, upright flower spike between 20 and 45 cm long that loosely holds 10 to 20 flowers, each paired with a small, sharp, triangular leaf-like bract.
