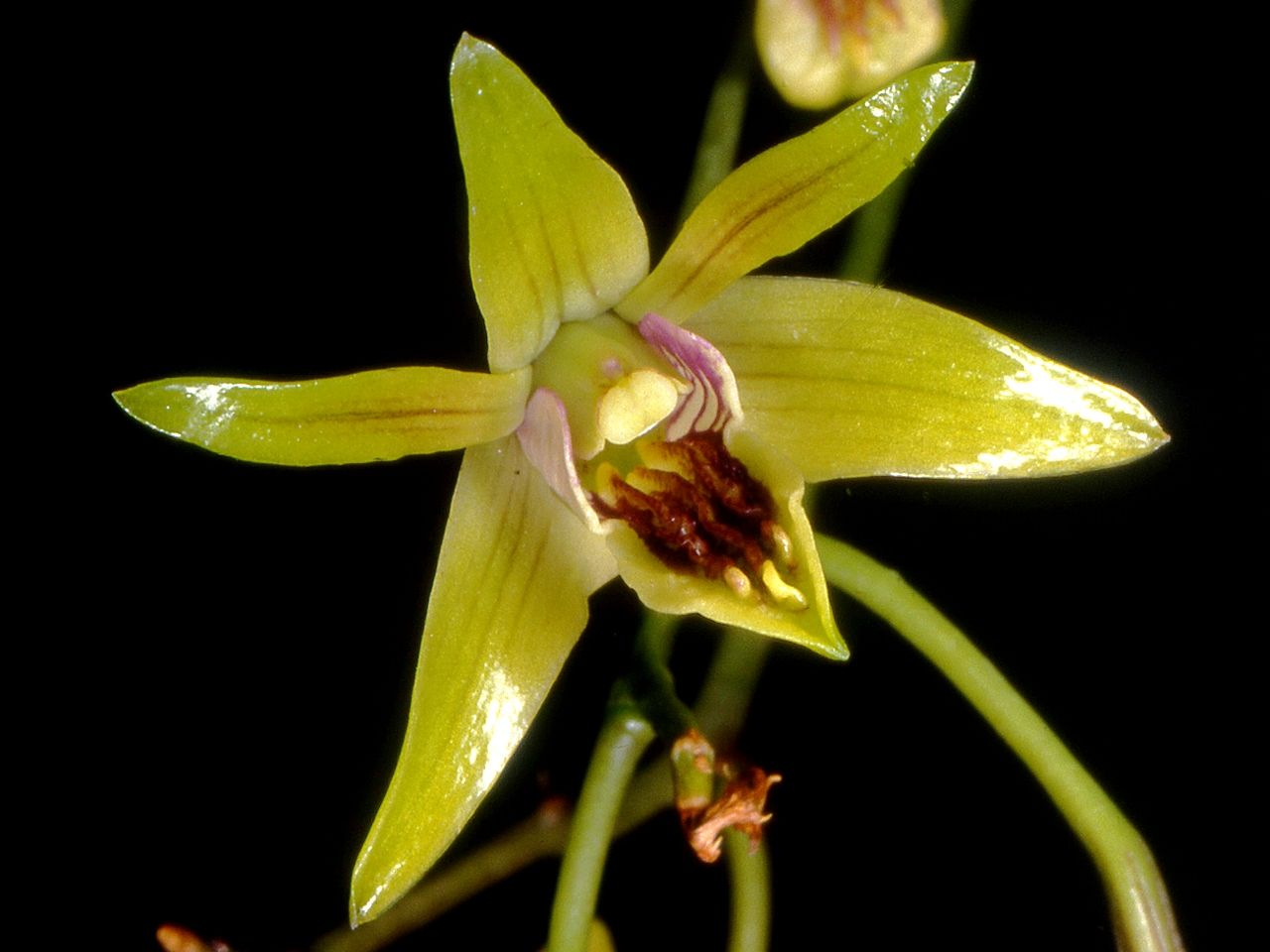
- Flower of D. capra

Conservation status
- Endangered (IUCN 3.1)

Scientific classification
- Kingdom: Plantae
- Clade: Tracheophytes
- Clade: Angiosperms
- Clade: Monocots
- Order: Asparagales
- Family: Orchidaceae
- Subfamily: Epidendroideae
- Genus: Dendrobium
- Species: D. capra

Binomial name
- Dendrobium capra J.J.Sm.

Synonyms
- Cepobaculum capra (J.J.Sm.) M.A. Clem. & D.L. Jones

= Dendrobium capra =

Species of orchid

Dendrobium capra is a species of orchid endemic to the island of Java in Indonesia. It was described by Dutch botanist Johannes Jacobus Smith in 1910.

In 2019, Dendrobium capra is listed on the International Union for Conservation of Nature (IUCN) Red List as Endangered species.
