= Dendrobium macranthum =

Conservation status
- Least Concern (IUCN 3.1)

Scientific classification
- Kingdom: Plantae
- Clade: Tracheophytes
- Clade: Angiosperms
- Clade: Monocots
- Order: Asparagales
- Family: Orchidaceae
- Subfamily: Epidendroideae
- Genus: Dendrobium
- Species: D. macranthum

Binomial name
- Dendrobium macranthum A.Rich.

Synonyms
- Dendrobium arachnostachyum Rchb.f.; Callista macrantha (A.Rich.) Kuntze; Dendrobium tokai var. crassinerve Finet; Dendrobium pseudotokai Kraenzl.; Durabaculum macranthum (A.Rich.) M.A.Clem. & D.L.Jones; Sayeria pseudotokai (Kraenzl.) Rauschert

Species of orchid

Dendrobium macranthum is a species of orchid native to New Caledonia, the Santa Cruz Islands, Vanuatu, and Wallis and Futuna. It was described by French botanist Achille Richard in 1834.
