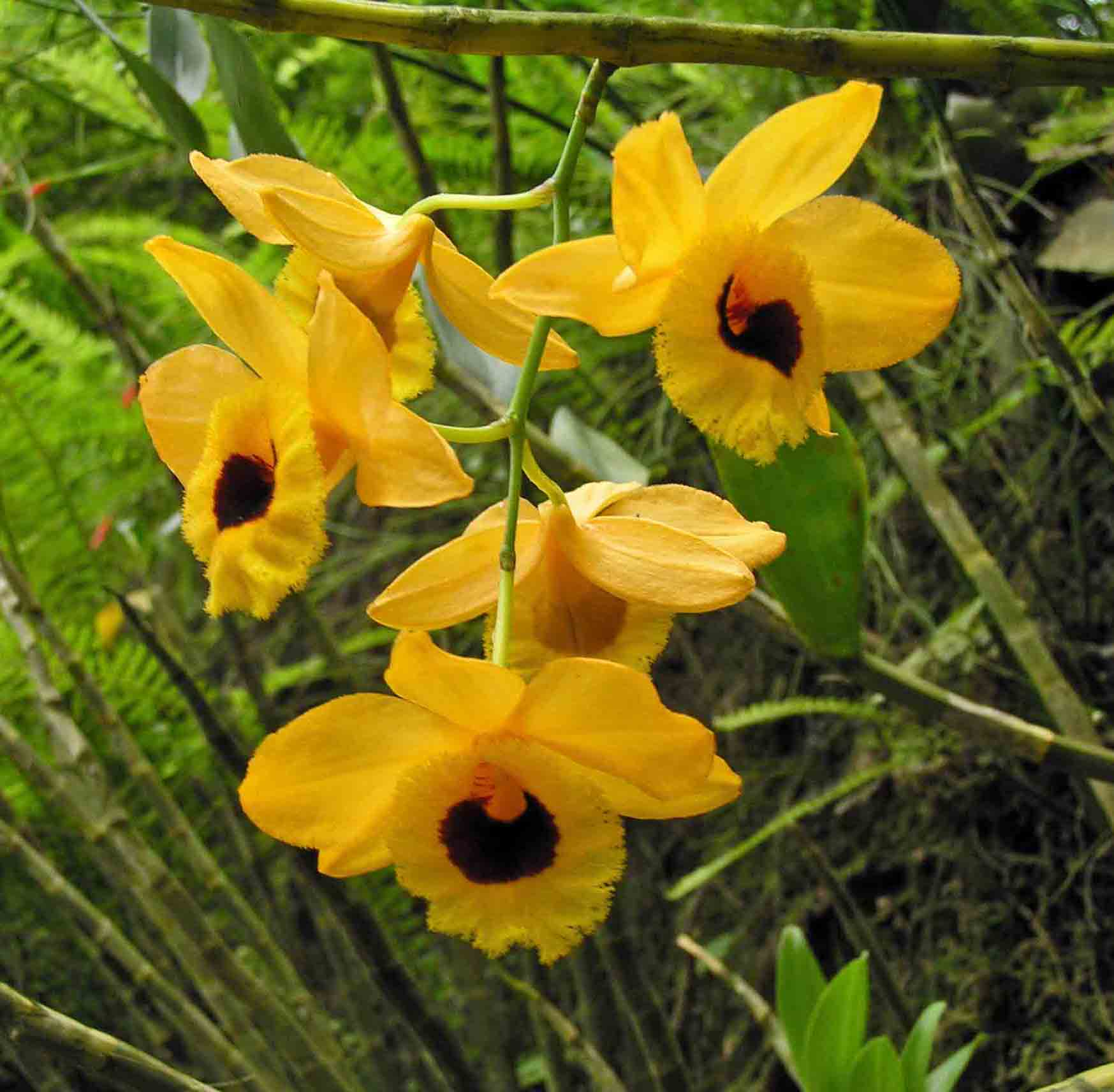
- Dendrobium chrysotoxum var. suavissimum

Scientific classification
- Kingdom: Plantae
- Clade: Tracheophytes
- Clade: Angiosperms
- Clade: Monocots
- Order: Asparagales
- Family: Orchidaceae
- Subfamily: Epidendroideae
- Genus: Dendrobium
- Section: Dendrobium sect. Densiflora; Finet 1903

Type species
- Dendrobium densiflorum

Species
- See text

Synonyms
- Callista Lour 1790; Endeisa Raf. 1836/38; Dendrobium sect. Bolbidium subsect. Indivisa Pfitz 1889; Dendrobium sect. Callista (Lour.)Schlechter 1912; Dendrobium sect. Chrysotoxa Kraenzl. 1910

= Dendrobium sect. Densiflora =

Subgenus of flowering plants

Dendrobium section Densiflora is a section of the genus Dendrobium.

== Description ==
Plants in this section have pseudobulbous stems with pendulous inflorescence, borne from leaf axils.

== Distribution ==
Plants from this section are found in China, the Himalayas, and Southeast Asia.

== Species ==
Dendrobium section Densiflora comprises the following species:

Image	Name	Distribution	Elevation (m)
	Dendrobium amabile O'Brien 1909	Vietnam	1,200 metres (3,900 ft)
	Dendrobium brymerianum Rchb. f. 1875	northeastern India, north Thailand, Myanmar, northern Laos, and China (Yunnan)	1,100–1,900 metres (3,600–6,200 ft)
	Dendrobium chrysotoxum Lindley 1847	Myanmar, Laos, Thailand, Vietnam, China(Yunnan), Bangladesh and India (Assam)	400–600 metres (1,300–2,000 ft)
	Dendrobium densiflorum Lindl. ex Wall. 1829	India (Assam), Bangladesh, Nepal, Myanmar, Thailand, Laos, Vietnam, China (Guangdong, Gunagxi, Hainan, Xizang)	400–1,000 metres (1,300–3,300 ft)
	Dendrobium farmeri Paxton 1849	India( Assam, Arunachal Pradesh), Nepal, Myanmar, Vietnam, Thailand, Laos and Peninsular Malaysia	150–1,000 metres (490–3,280 ft)
	Dendrobium griffithianum Lindl. 1836	India (Assam), Myanmar and Thailand	490–500 metres (1,610–1,640 ft)
	Dendrobium harveyanum Rchb.f. 1883	China (Yunnan), Myanmar, Thailand and Vietnam	1,100–1,700 metres (3,600–5,600 ft)
	Dendrobium histrionicum (Rchb.f.) Schltr. 1914	Myanmar	1,500 metres (4,900 ft)
	Dendrobium jenkinsii Wallich ex Lindley 1839	China (Yunnan), India (Assam), Nepal, Myanmar and Laos	700–1,300 metres (2,300–4,300 ft)
	Dendrobium lindleyi Steud. 1840	India (Assam), Myanmar, Thailand, China(Guangdong, Guangxi, Guizhou, Hainan), Laos, Cambodia and Vietnam	400–1,300 metres (1,300–4,300 ft)
	Dendrobium palpebrae Lindley 1850	Bangladesh, Myanmar, Thailand, Laos, and Vietnam	800–2,500 metres (2,600–8,200 ft)
	Dendrobium sulcatum Lindl. 1838	India (Assam), Myanmar, Thailand, Laos and China (Yunnan)	500–1,000 metres (1,600–3,300 ft)
	Dendrobium thyrsiflorum Rchb.f 1875	China (Yunnan), India (Assam, Arunachal Pradesh), Bhutan, Myanmar, Thailand, Laos and Vietnam	1,100–1,800 metres (3,600–5,900 ft)
