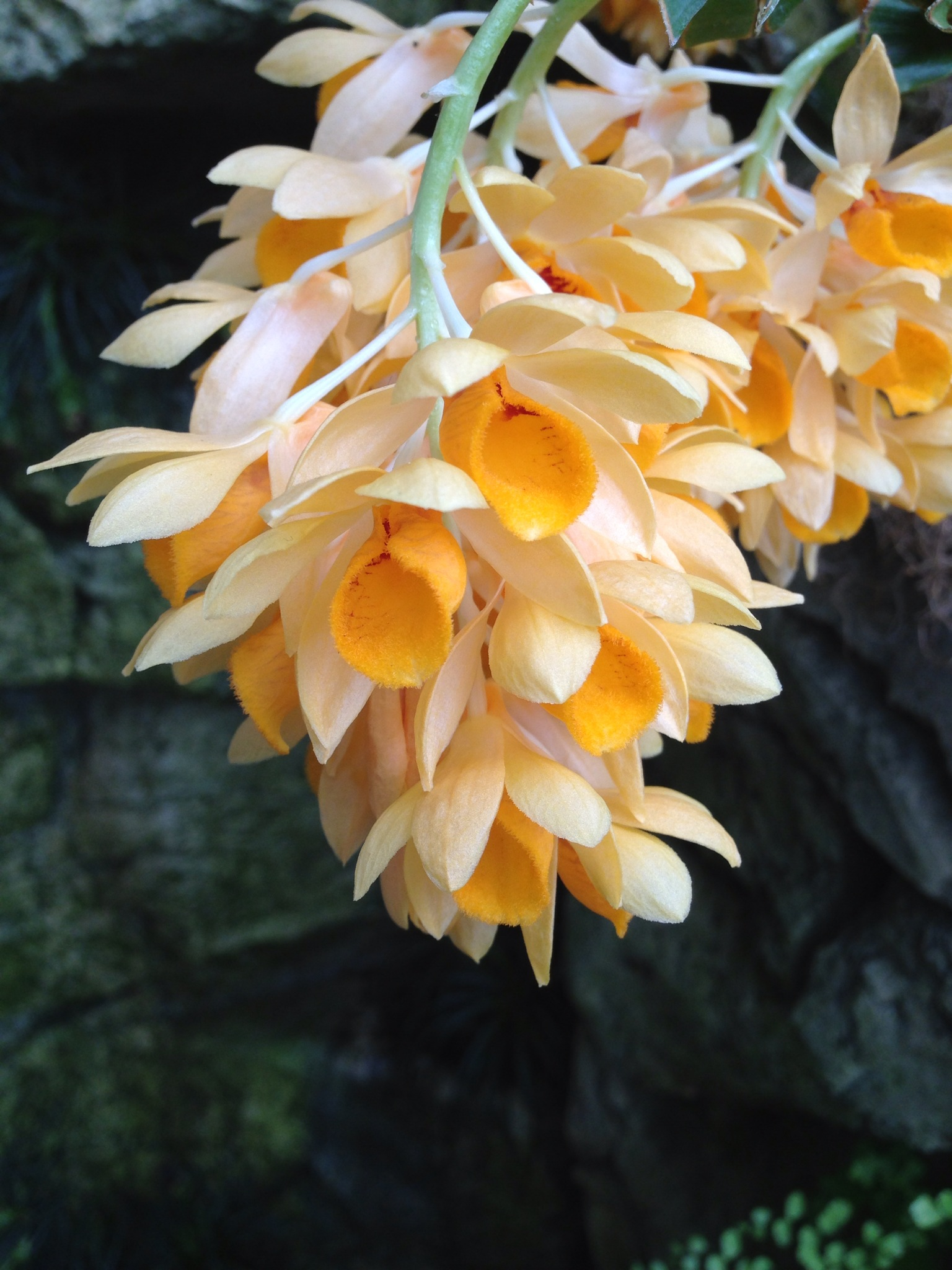

Scientific classification
- Kingdom: Plantae
- Clade: Tracheophytes
- Clade: Angiosperms
- Clade: Monocots
- Order: Asparagales
- Family: Orchidaceae
- Subfamily: Epidendroideae
- Genus: Dendrobium
- Species: D. sulcatum

Binomial name
- Dendrobium sulcatum Lindl.

Synonyms
- Callista sulcata (Lindl.) Kuntze

= Dendrobium sulcatum =

Furrowed-lip dendrobium

Species of orchid

Dendrobium sulcatum, the furrowed-lip dendrobium, is an orchid native to Asia, in the family Orchidaceae.

== Distribution and habitat ==
The plant is native to:

- The Eastern Himalayas — in Bhutan, China in Yunnan, and Northeastern India in Assam, Arunachal Pradesh, and Sikkim.
- Northern Indochina — in Laos, Thailand, and Myanmar.

It is an epiphyte and grows on tree trunks in dense forests.
