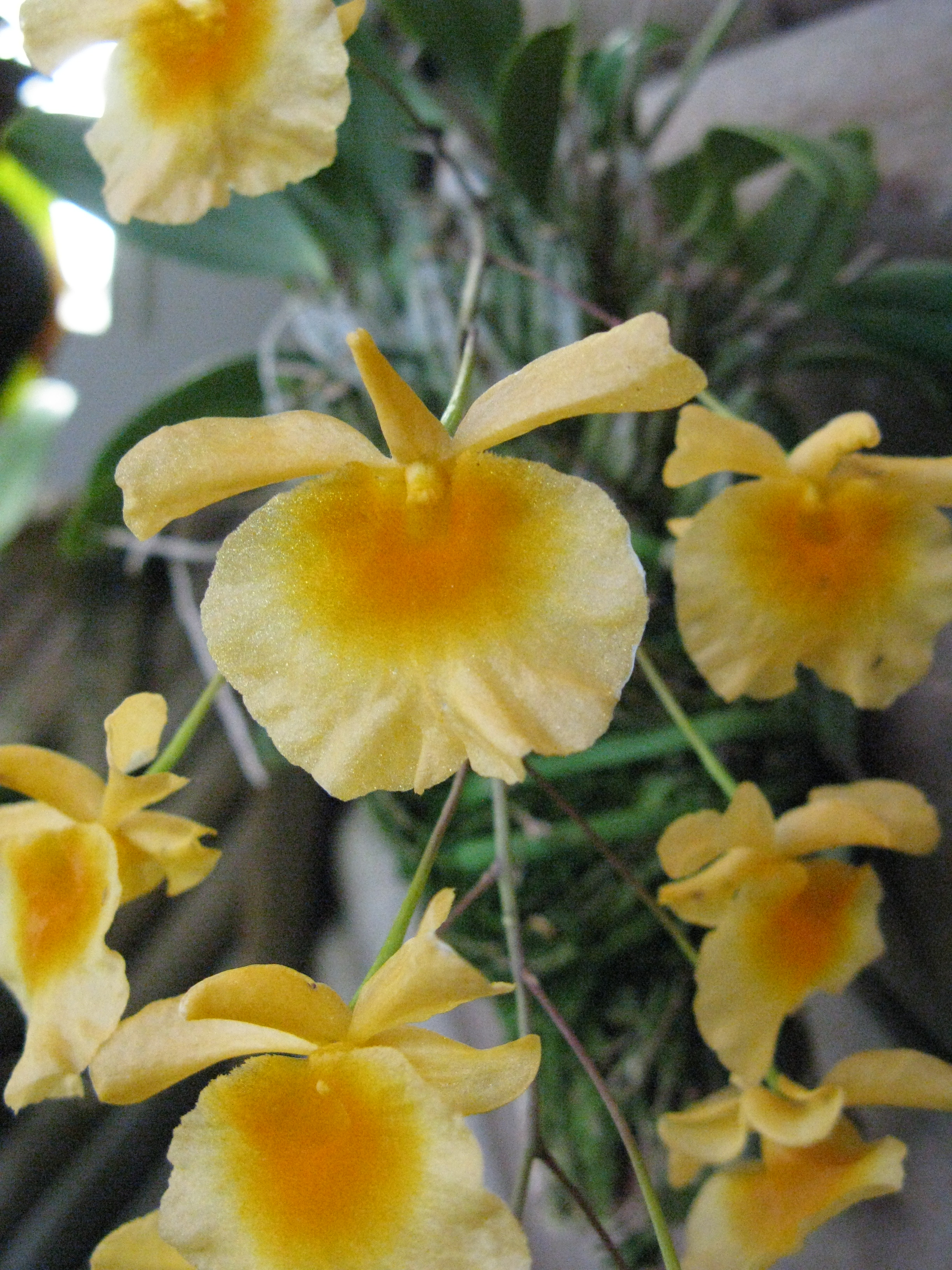

Scientific classification
- Kingdom: Plantae
- Clade: Tracheophytes
- Clade: Angiosperms
- Clade: Monocots
- Order: Asparagales
- Family: Orchidaceae
- Subfamily: Epidendroideae
- Genus: Dendrobium
- Species: D. lindleyi

Binomial name
- Dendrobium lindleyi Steud., 1840

Synonyms
- Dendrobium aggregatum Roxb. 1832, illegitimate homonym, not Kunth 1816; Callista aggregata Kuntze; Epidendrum aggregatum Roxb. ex Steud., as synonym; Dendrobium alboviride var. majus Rolfe; Dendrobium lindleyi var. majus (Rolfe) S.Y.Hu

= Dendrobium lindleyi =

Lindley's Dendrobium

Species of orchid

Dendrobium lindleyi (Lindley's Dendrobium), also known as Dendrobium aggregatum (nom. illeg.), is a plant of the genus Dendrobium. They are found in the mountains of southern China (Guangdong, Guangxi, Guizhou, Hainan) and Southeast Asia (Assam, Bangladesh, Arunachal Pradesh, Laos, Myanmar, Thailand, Vietnam).

Dendrobium lindleyi flowers in spring with inflorescences of about 10–30 cm (4–12 in) long having 5 to 15 flowers. The plant enjoys a lot of light.

== Taxonomic confusion ==
Ernst Gottlieb von Steudel published the first valid description of this taxon in 1840, on page 490 of Nomencl. Bot., ed. 2, 1. In the same publication, on page 556, William Roxburgh moved the taxon to Epidendrum aggregatum Roxb. ex Steud., a change of genus which has been rejected. The next year, John Lindley published a very different plant (which is still recognized as an Epidendrum, not a Dendrobium) as Epidendrum aggregatum. Thus, Epidendrum aggregatum Roxb. ex Steud. is a synonym for Dendrobium lindleyi Steud., but Epidendrum aggregatum Lindl. is the name of a very different orchid, and is not a synonym for Dendrobium lindleyi Steud.
