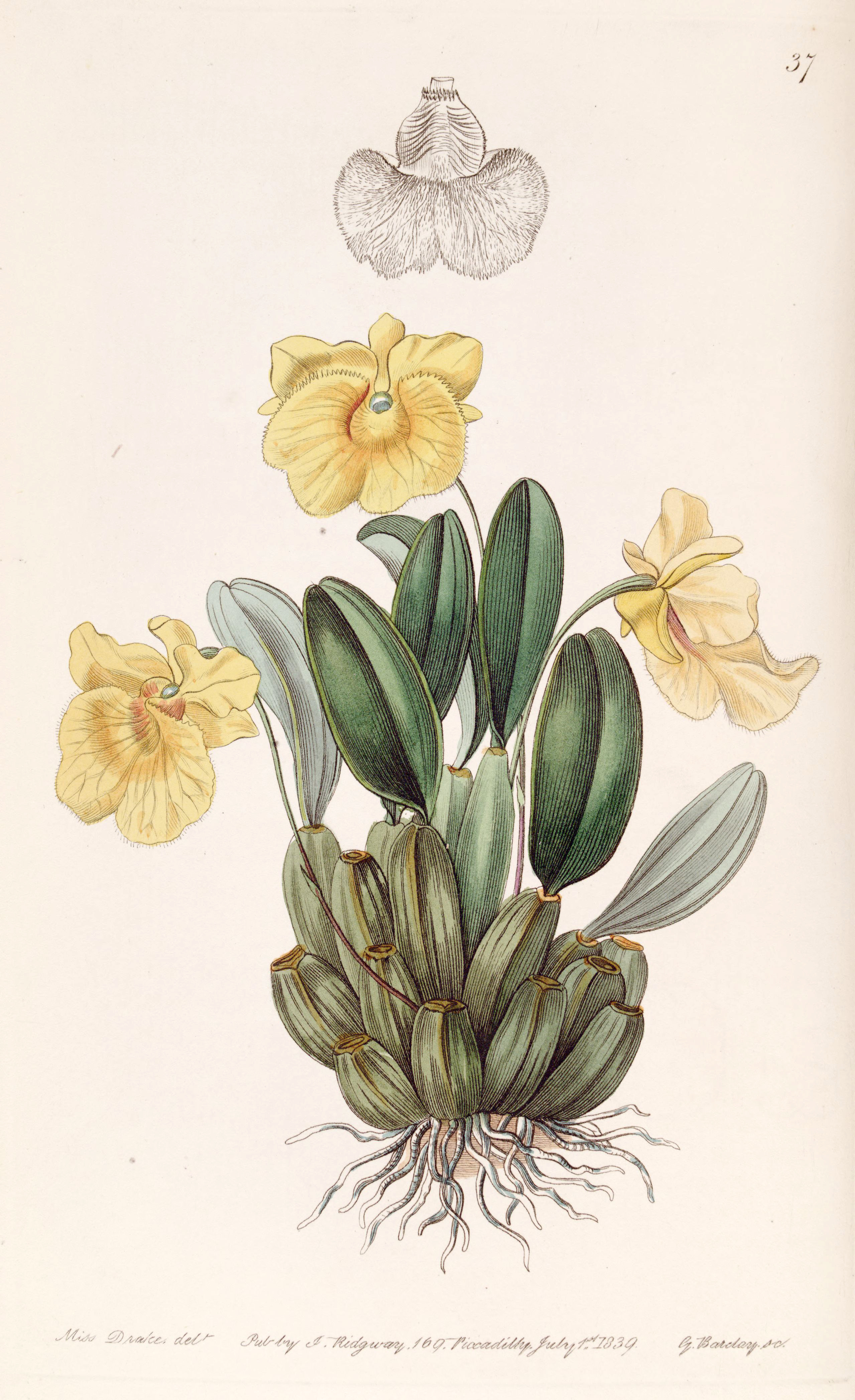
- 1839 illustration

Scientific classification
- Kingdom: Plantae
- Clade: Embryophytes
- Clade: Tracheophytes
- Clade: Angiosperms
- Clade: Monocots
- Order: Asparagales
- Family: Orchidaceae
- Subfamily: Epidendroideae
- Genus: Dendrobium
- Species: D. jenkinsii

Binomial name
- Dendrobium jenkinsii Wall. ex Lindl.

Synonyms
- Dendrobium aggregatum var. jenkinsii (Wall. ex Lindl.) King & Pantl.; Dendrobium marseillei Gagnep.

= Dendrobium jenkinsii =

Jenkins's dendrobium

Species of orchid

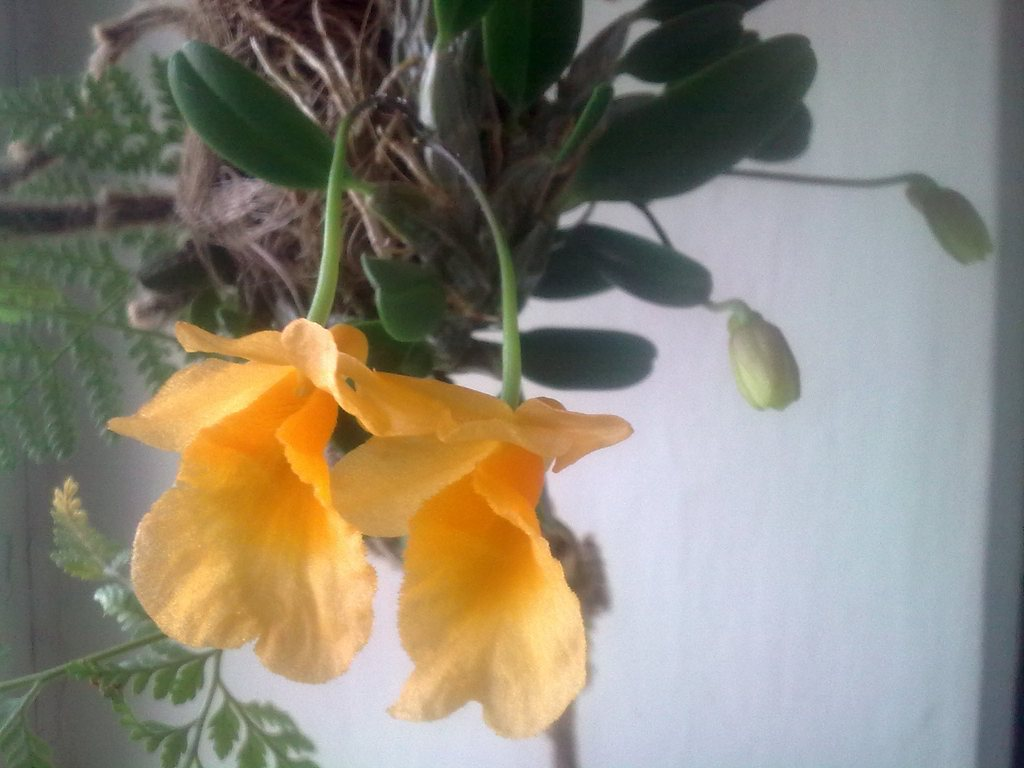
Dendrobium jenkinsii

Dendrobium jenkinsii, the Jenkins's dendrobium, is a species of orchid. It is native to southern China (Yunnan), the eastern Himalayas (Bhutan, Assam) and northern Indochina (Vietnam, Thailand, Laos, Myanmar).
