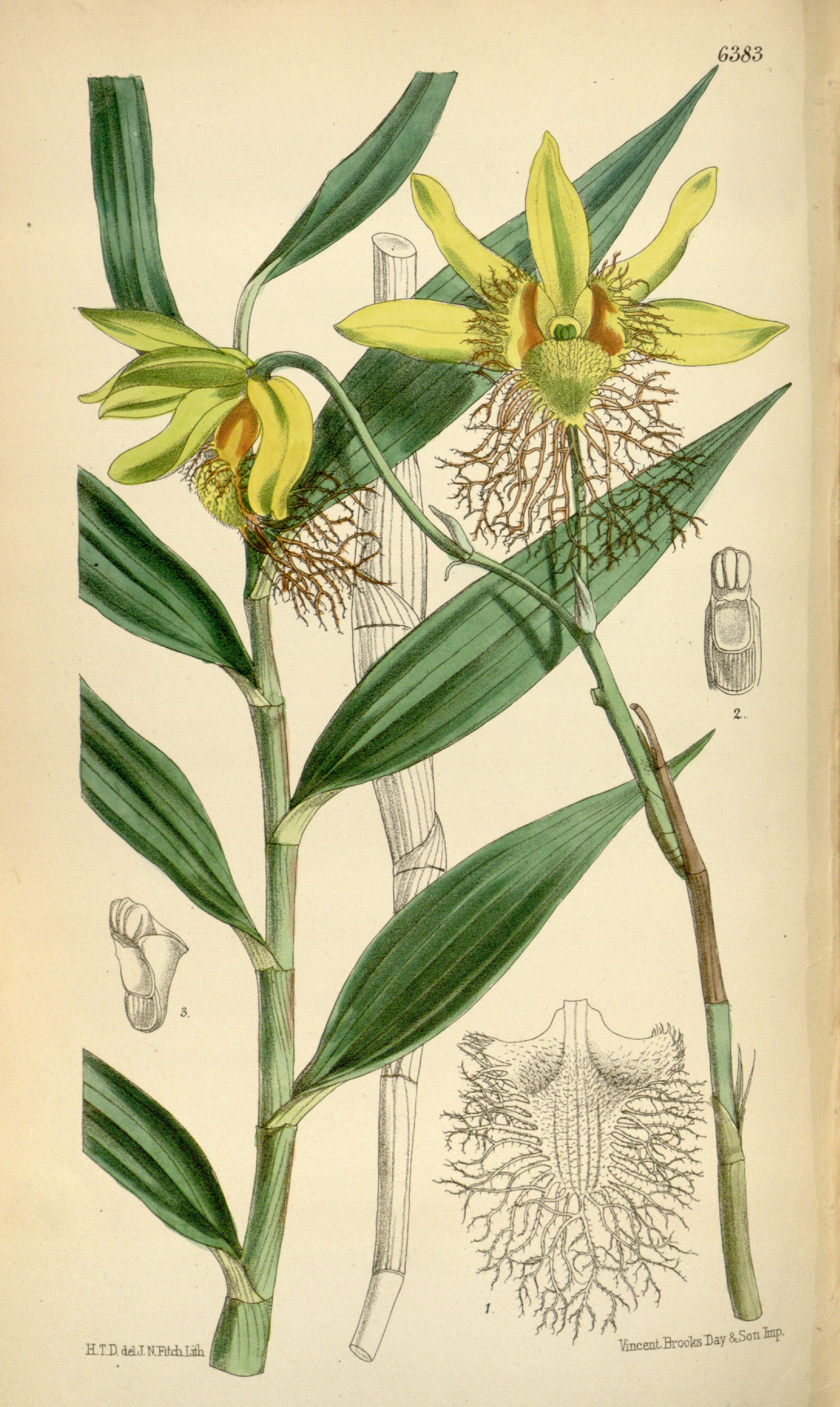
- 1877 illustration

Scientific classification
- Kingdom: Plantae
- Clade: Embryophytes
- Clade: Tracheophytes
- Clade: Angiosperms
- Clade: Monocots
- Order: Asparagales
- Family: Orchidaceae
- Subfamily: Epidendroideae
- Genus: Dendrobium
- Species: D. brymerianum

Binomial name
- Dendrobium brymerianum Rchb.f. (1875)

Synonyms
- Callista brymerana (Rchb.f.) Kuntze (1891)

= Dendrobium brymerianum =

Brymer's dendrobium

Species of orchid

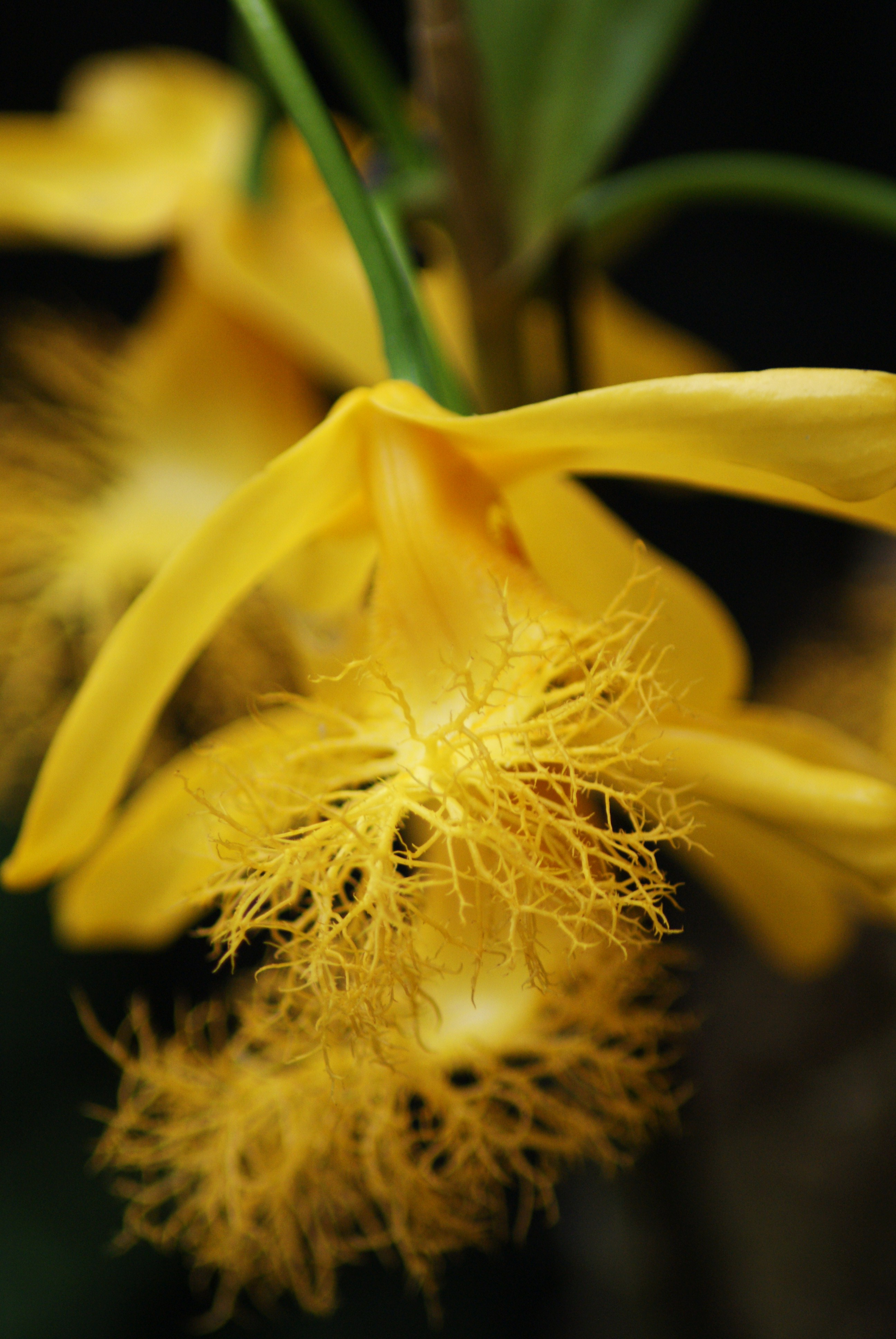
Dendrobium brymerianum flower

Dendrobium brymerianum (Brymer's dendrobium) is a species of orchid. It is native to Yunnan, Assam, and northern Indochina (Myanmar, Thailand, Laos, Vietnam). It grows on tree trunks.
