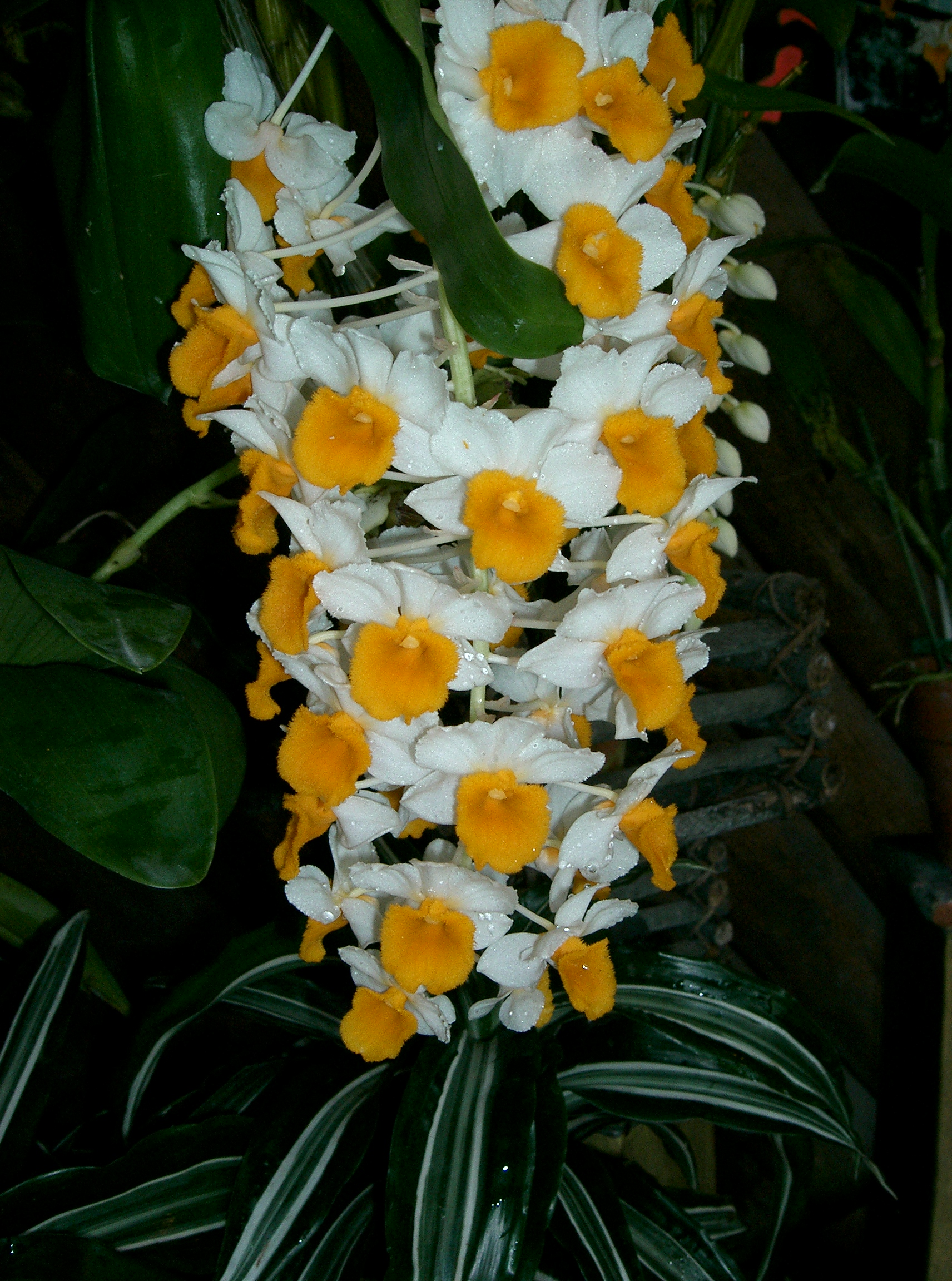

Scientific classification
- Kingdom: Plantae
- Clade: Tracheophytes
- Clade: Angiosperms
- Clade: Monocots
- Order: Asparagales
- Family: Orchidaceae
- Subfamily: Epidendroideae
- Genus: Dendrobium
- Species: D. thyrsiflorum

Binomial name
- Dendrobium thyrsiflorum Rchb.f. ex André

Synonyms
- Dendrobium densiflorum var. alboluteum Hook.f.; Dendrobium galliceanum Linden; Callista thyrsiflora (Rchb.f. ex André) M.A. Clem.

= Dendrobium thyrsiflorum =

Pinecone-like raceme dendrobium

Species of orchid

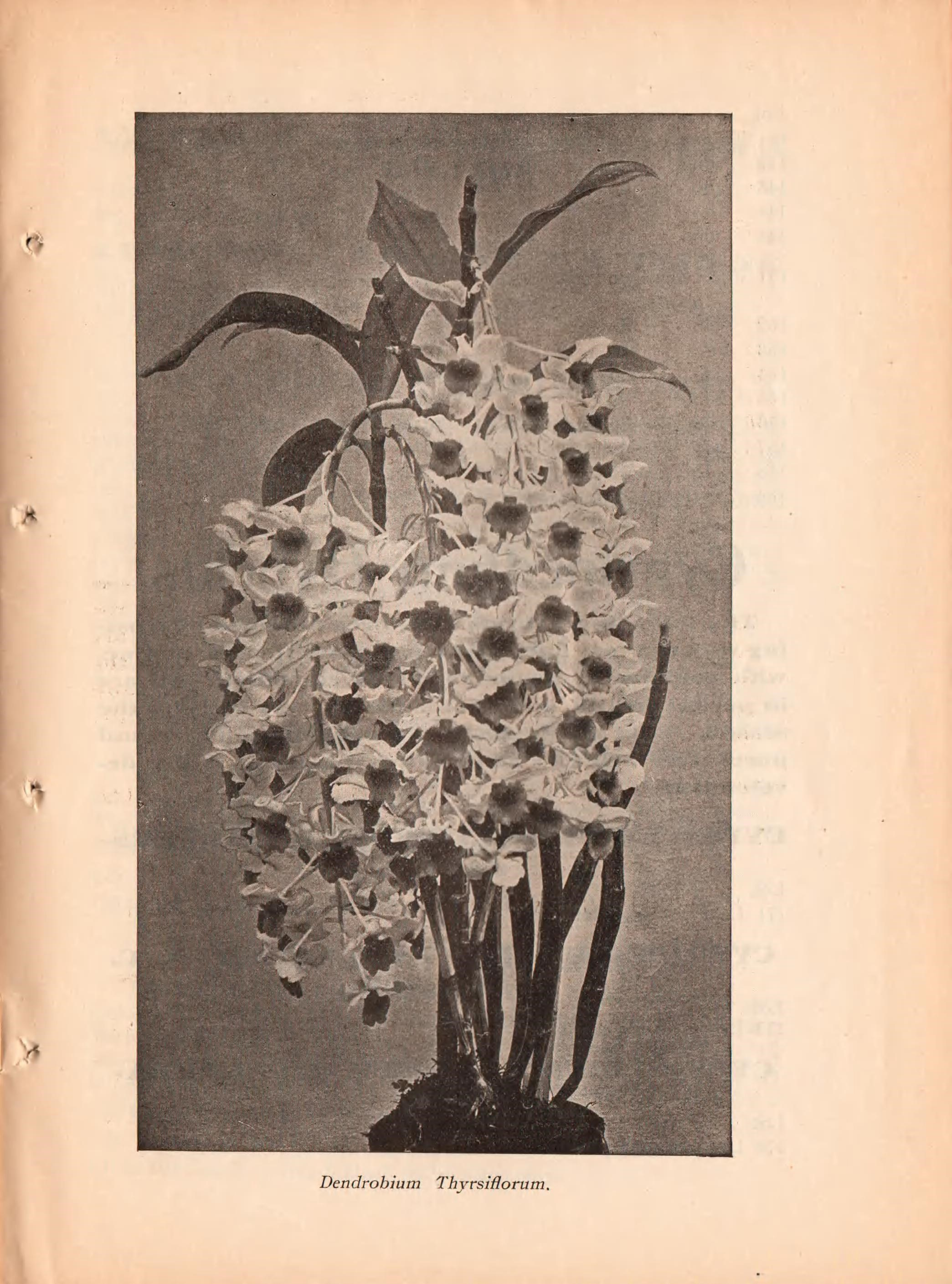

Dendrobium thyrsiflorum is a species of orchid, commonly called the pinecone-like raceme dendrobium. It is native to the Himalayas (Bhutan, Assam, Yunnan and Arunachal Pradesh) as well as to the mountains of northern Indochina (Myanmar, Thailand, Laos and Vietnam).

Two varieties are recognized:

- Dendrobium thyrsiflorum var. minutiflorum Aver. - Laos
- Dendrobium thyrsiflorum var. thyrsiflorum - most of species range
