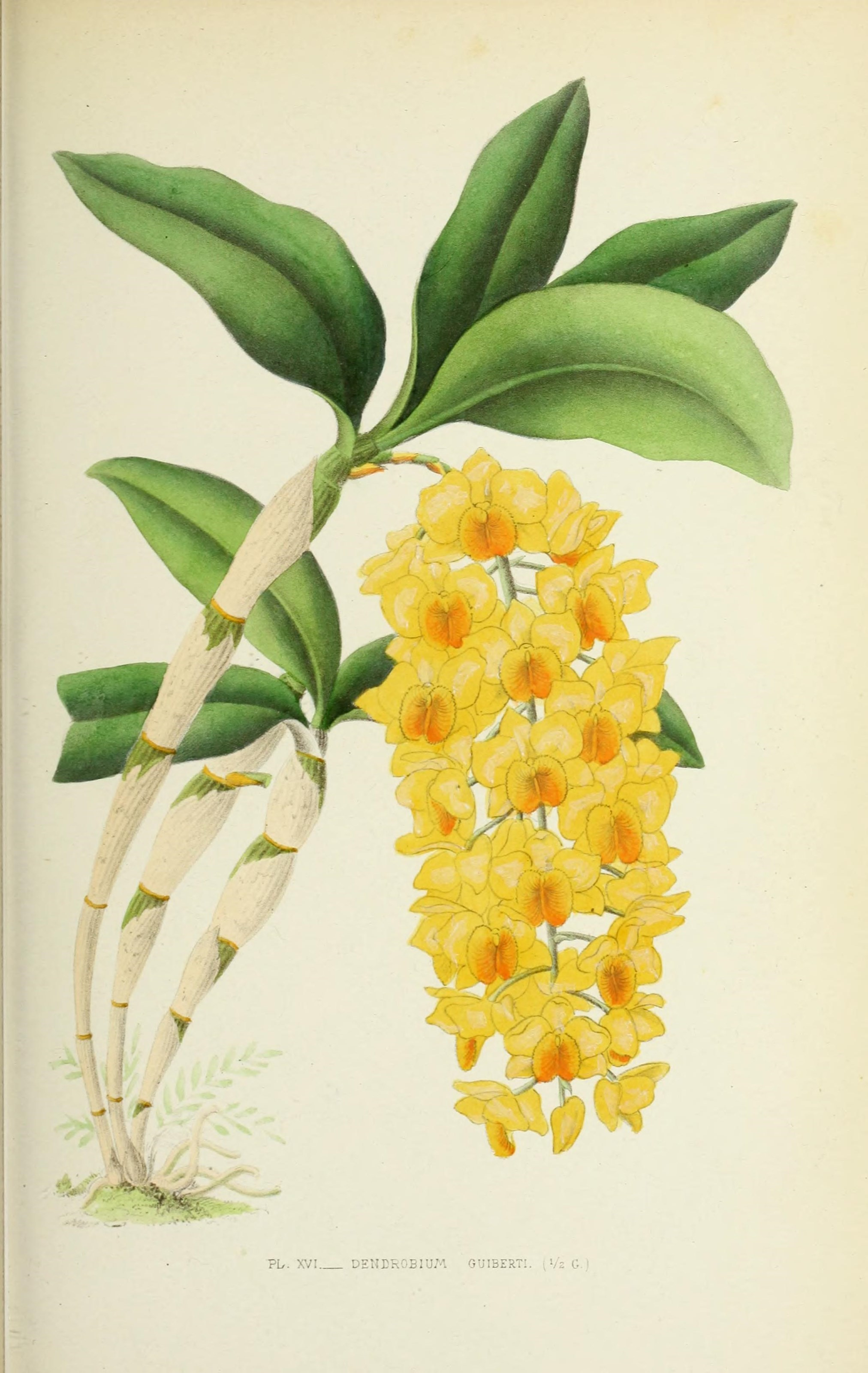
- Illustration by Paul Émile de Puydt

Scientific classification
- Kingdom: Plantae
- Clade: Tracheophytes
- Clade: Angiosperms
- Clade: Monocots
- Order: Asparagales
- Family: Orchidaceae
- Subfamily: Epidendroideae
- Genus: Dendrobium
- Species: D. guibertii

Binomial name
- Dendrobium guibertii Carrière

Synonyms
- Callista guibertii (Carrière) M.A.Clem. (2003)

= Dendrobium guibertii =

Species of orchid

Dendrobium guibertii is a species of orchid endemic to Thailand. It was first formally described in 1876 by Élie-Abel Carrière and the description was published in Revue Horticole. The specific epithet (guibertii) honours "M. Guibert of Passy-Paris, well known in the world of horticulture for his remarkable collection of orchids".
