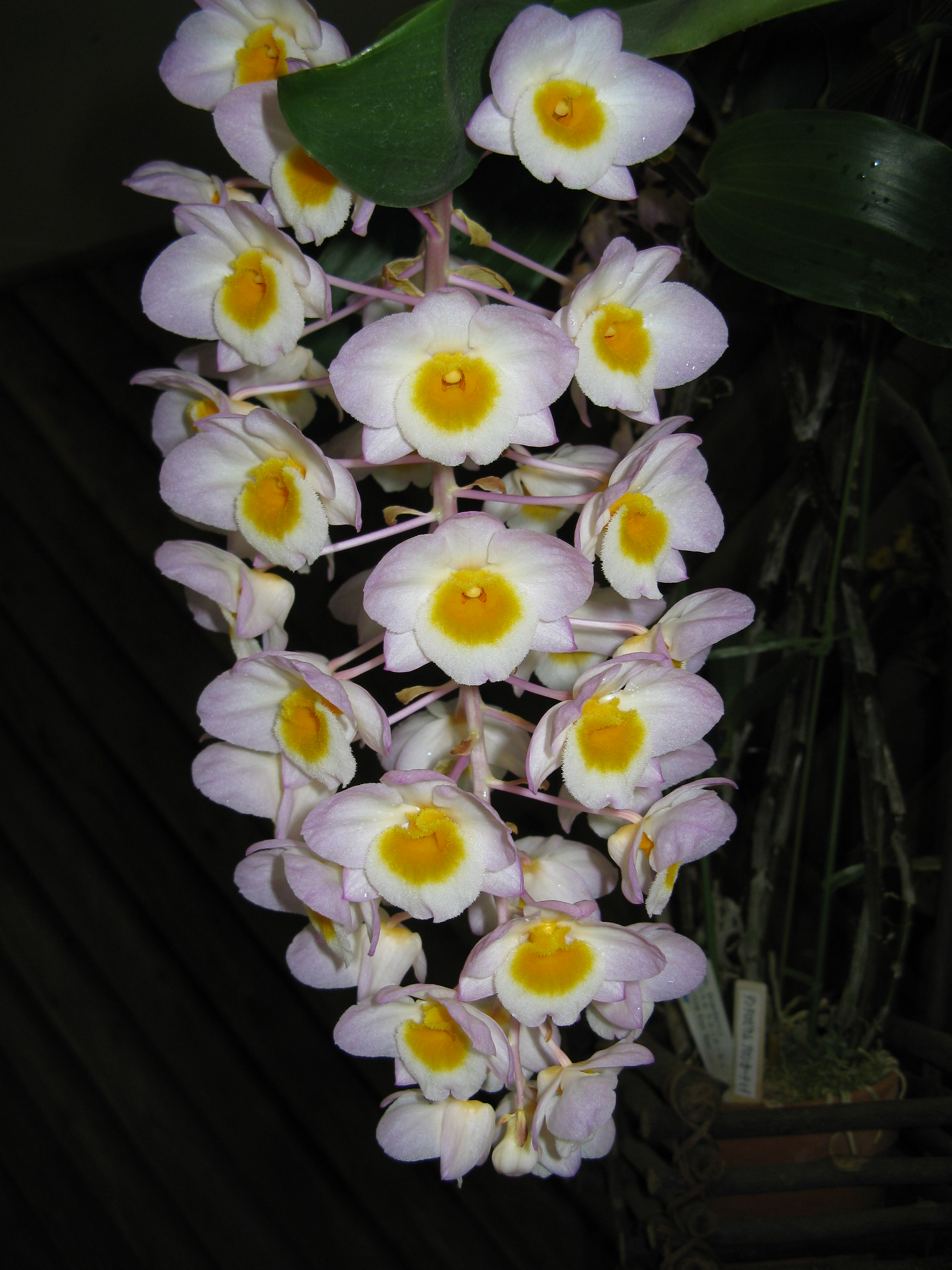

Scientific classification
- Kingdom: Plantae
- Clade: Tracheophytes
- Clade: Angiosperms
- Clade: Monocots
- Order: Asparagales
- Family: Orchidaceae
- Subfamily: Epidendroideae
- Genus: Dendrobium
- Species: D. amabile

Binomial name
- Dendrobium amabile (Lour.) O'Brien

Synonyms
- Homotypic Synonyms: Callista amabilis Lour.; Epidendrum callista Raeusch.; Heterotypic Synonyms: Dendrobium bronckartii De Wild.

= Dendrobium amabile =

Species of orchid

Dendrobium amabile is a species of flowering plant in the family Orchidaceae. This orchid is endemic to Vietnam.
