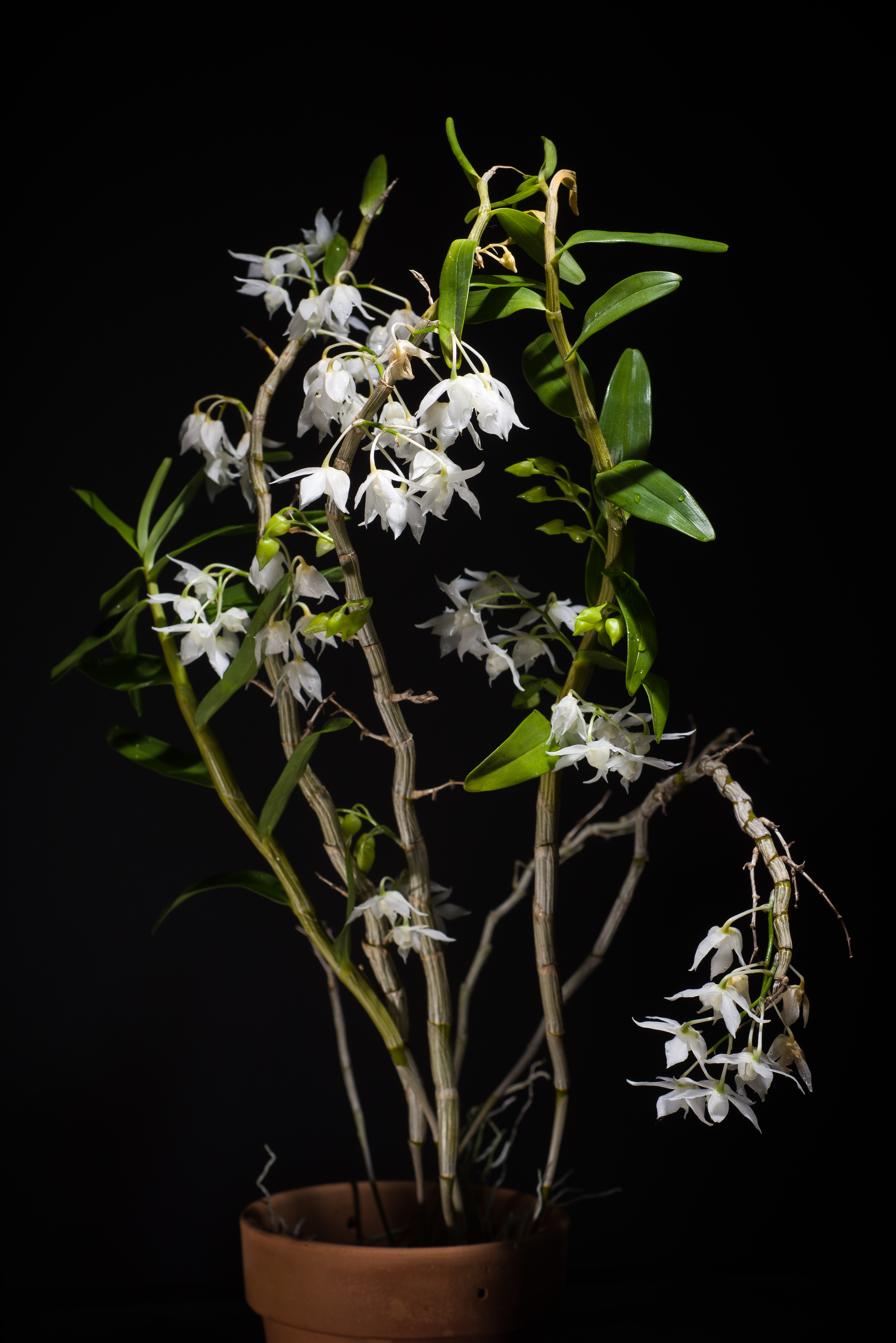
- Dendrobium hercoglossum fma. album 'Yukinko'

Scientific classification
- Kingdom: Plantae
- Clade: Tracheophytes
- Clade: Angiosperms
- Clade: Monocots
- Order: Asparagales
- Family: Orchidaceae
- Subfamily: Epidendroideae
- Genus: Dendrobium
- Section: Dendrobium sect. Breviflora; J. D. Hooker 1890

Type species
- Dendrobium bicameratum

Species
- See text

= Dendrobium sect. Breviflora =

Subgenus of flowering plants

Dendrobium section Breviflora is a section of the genus Dendrobium.

== Description ==
Plants in this section have pendulous tall slender stems that are swollen towards the apex. Plant blooms on a inflorescence with 3-10 flowers.

== Distribution ==
Plants from this section are found from southern Asia from India to Thailand.

== Species ==
Dendrobium section Breviflora comprises the following species:

Image	Name	Distribution	Elevation (m)
	Dendrobium aduncum Lindl. 1842	India (Sikkim, Assam), Bhutan, Myanmar, Thailand, Laos, China (Guangdong, Guangxi, Ghuizhou, Hainan, Hunan, Yunnan, Hong Kong) and Vietnam	300–1,300 metres (980–4,270 ft)
	Dendrobium aqueum Lindl. 1843	India	900–2,200 metres (3,000–7,200 ft)
	Dendrobium bicameratum Lindl. 1839	Bangladesh, India (Assam), Nepal, Myanmar, Thailand	600–2,400 metres (2,000–7,900 ft)
	Dendrobium bifurcatum T.Yukawa 2003	Vietnam	
	Dendrobium dantaniense Guillaumin 1957	Myanmar, Thailand and Vietnam	
	Dendrobium farinatum Schildh. & Schraut 2004	Vietnam	800–1,500 metres (2,600–4,900 ft)
	Dendrobium hercoglossum Rchb.f. 1886	Myanmar, Thailand, Malaysia, Laos, Cambodia, Vietnam, China (Anhui , SW Guangdong, Guangxi, Guizhou, Hainan, Hunan, Jiangxi, Yunnan), Philippines	50–1,300 metres (160–4,270 ft)
	Dendrobium linguella Rchb.f. 1882	Myanmar, Thailand, Vietnam, Borneo (Sumatra) and Malaysia	300–1,250 metres (980–4,100 ft)
	Dendrobium trantuanii Perner & X.N.Dang 2003	Vietnam	1,700 metres (5,600 ft)
	Dendrobium thinhii Aver. 2015	Vietnam	800–1,000 metres (2,600–3,300 ft)
