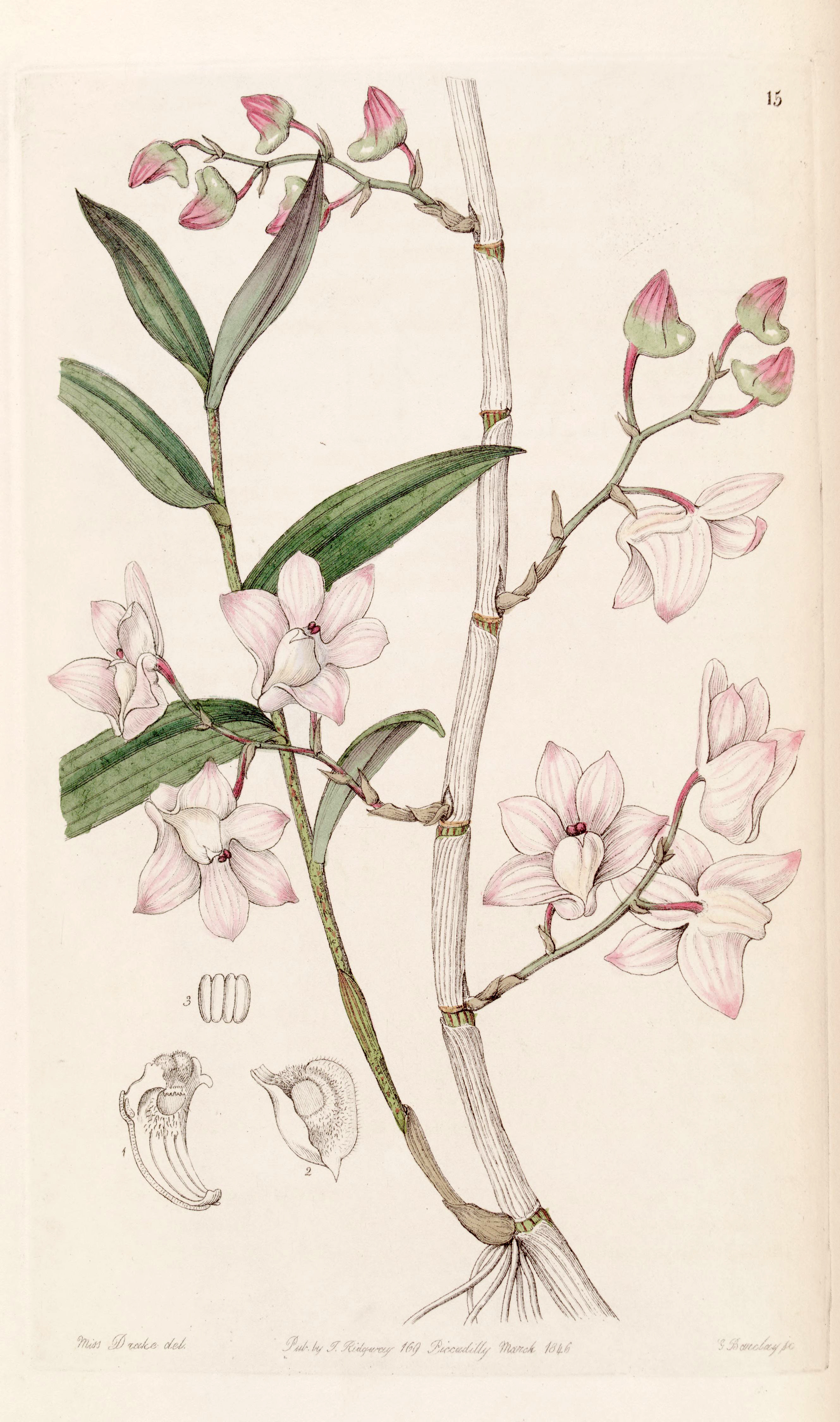
- 1846 illustration

Scientific classification
- Kingdom: Plantae
- Clade: Embryophytes
- Clade: Tracheophytes
- Clade: Angiosperms
- Clade: Monocots
- Order: Asparagales
- Family: Orchidaceae
- Subfamily: Epidendroideae
- Genus: Dendrobium
- Species: D. aduncum

Binomial name
- Dendrobium aduncum Lindl. (1842)

Synonyms
- Callista adunca (Lindl.) Kuntze (1891); Dendrobium faulhaberianum Schltr. (1911); Dendrobium oxyanthum Gagnep. (1930); Dendrobium aduncum var. faulhaberianum (Schltr.) Tang & F.T.Wang (1951)

= Dendrobium aduncum =

Species of orchid

Dendrobium aduncum (the angelfish orchid or inward-bent dendrobium) is a species of orchid. It is native to southern China (Guangdong, Guangxi, Guizhou, Hainan, Hunan, Yunnan), the eastern Himalayas (Assam, Sikkim, Arunachal Pradesh, Bhutan, Myanmar), and northern Indochina (Laos, Thailand, Vietnam). It is an epiphyte and grows on the tree trunks of mountain forests.
