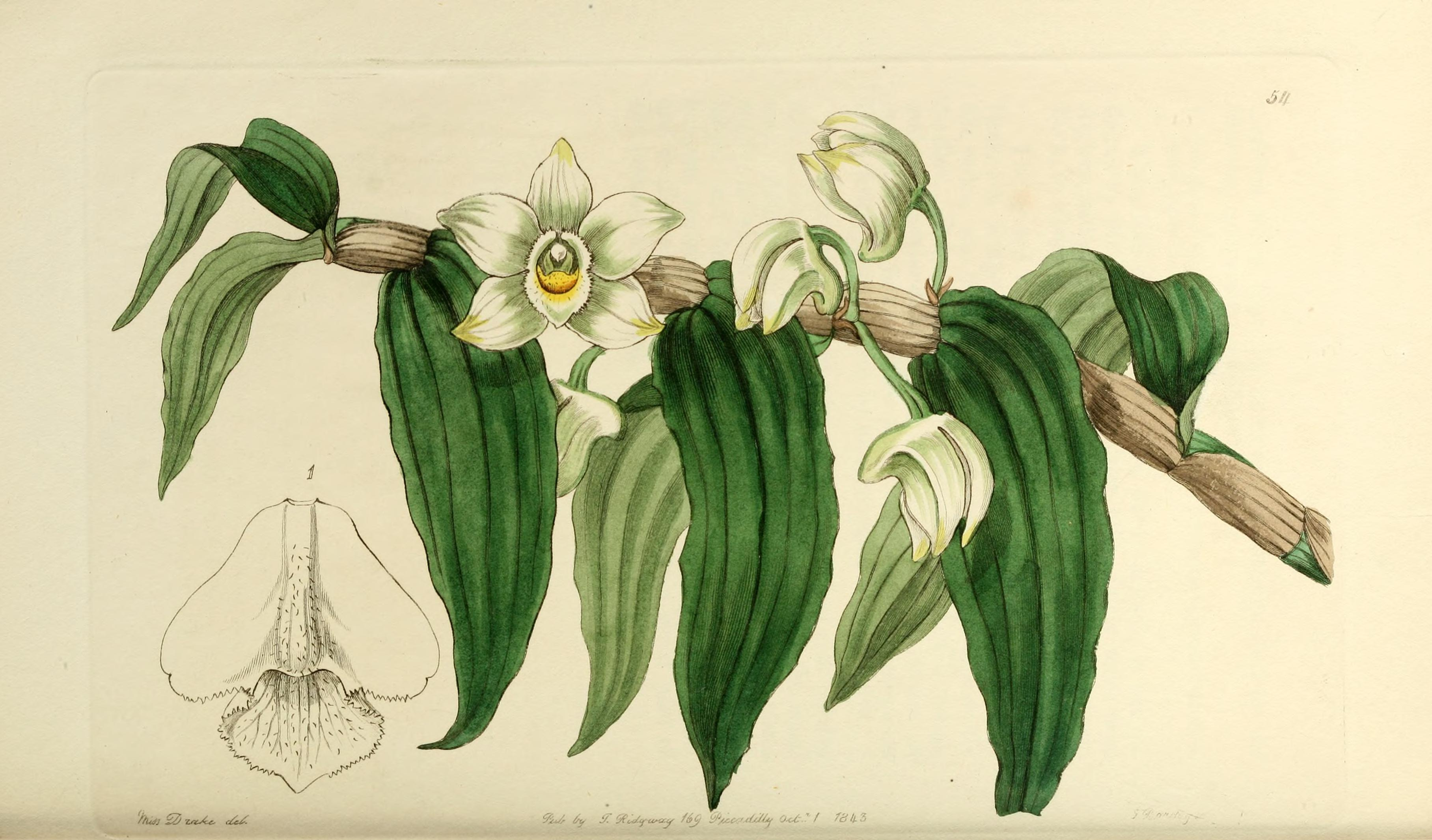
- 1843 illustration

Scientific classification
- Kingdom: Plantae
- Clade: Embryophytes
- Clade: Tracheophytes
- Clade: Angiosperms
- Clade: Monocots
- Order: Asparagales
- Family: Orchidaceae
- Subfamily: Epidendroideae
- Genus: Dendrobium
- Species: D. aqueum

Binomial name
- Dendrobium aqueum Lindl. (1843)

Synonyms
- Dendrobium album Wight (1851), illegitimate; Callista aquea (Lindl.) Kuntze (1891)

= Dendrobium aqueum =

Species of orchid

Dendrobium aqueum is a species of orchid endemic to southern India. It is found in the upper reaches of western ghats.
