= List of Habenaria species =

The following is a list of species of Habenaria recognised by the Plants of the World Online as at March 2024:

- Habenaria aberrans Schltr.
- Habenaria abortiens Lindl.
- Habenaria acalcarata Espejo & Lopez-Ferr.
- Habenaria achalensis Kraenzl.
- Habenaria achnantha Rchb.f.
- Habenaria achroantha Schltr.
- Habenaria achianthioides Schltr.
- Habenaria acuifera Wall. ex Lindl.
- Habenaria acuminata (Thwaites) Trimen
- Habenaria acuticalcar H.Perrier
- Habenaria adenantha A.Rich. & Galeotti
- Habenaria adolphi Schltr.
- Habenaria aethiopithica S.Thomas & P.J.Cribb
- Habenaria agapitae R.Gonzalez & Reynoso
- Habenaria agasthyamalaiana Jalal, Jayanthi & P.Suresh Kumar
- Habenaria agrestis R.Gonzalez & Cuev.-Fig.
- Habenaria aguirrei R.Gonzalez & Cuev.-Fig.
- Habenaria aitchisonii Rchb.f.
- Habenaria alagensis Ames
- Habenaria alata Hook. – winged bog orchid
- Habenaria albidorubra J.J.Sm.
- Habenaria alinae Szlach.
- Habenaria alishanensis T.P.Lin & D.M.Huang
- Habenaria alpestris Cogn.
- Habenaria alta Ridl.
- Habenaria alterosula Snuv. & Westra
- Habenaria altior
- Habenaria amalfitana F.Lehm & Kraenzl.
- Habenaria amambayensis Szlach.
- Habenaria amboinensis J.J.Sm.
- Habenaria ambositrana Schltr.
- Habenaria amoena Summerh.
- Habenaria amplexicaulis Rolfe & Downie
- Habenaria amplifolia Cheeseman
- Habenaria anaphysema Rchb.f.
- Habenaria adamanica Hook.f.
- Habenaria anguiceps Bolus
- Habenaria angustissima Summerh.
- Habenaria anisitsii Kraenzl.
- Habenaria ankylocentron Schuit. & J.J.Verm.
- Habenaria anomaliflora Kurzweil & Chantanaorr.
- Habenaria antennifera A.rich.
- Habenaria apetala Gagnep.
- Habenaria apiculata Summerh.
- Habenaria arachnoides
- Habenaria araneiflora Barb.Rodr.
- Habenaria aranifera Lindl.
- Habenaria arecunarum Schltr.
- Habenaria arenaria Lindl.
- Habenaria arenata G.A.Romero & J.A.N.Bat.
- Habenaria argentea P.J.Cribb
- Habenaria arianae Geerinck
- Habenaria aricaensis Hoehne
- Habenaria arietina Hook.f.
- Habenaria aristulifera Rchb.f.
- Habenaria armata Rchb.f.
- Habenaria armatissima Rchb.f.
- Habenaria atrata R.Gonzalez & Cuev.-Fig.
- Habenaria atrocalcarata R.Gonzalez & Cuev.-Fig.
- Habenaria attenuata Hook.f.
- Habenaria auriculoba J.J.Sm.
- Habenaria australis J.A.N.Bat.
- Habenaria austrosinensis Tang & F.T.Wang
- Habenaria avana Hook.f.
- Habenaria avicula Schltr.
- Habenaria aviculoides Ames & C.Schweinf.
- Habenaria ayangannensis Renz
- Habenaria bacata Dressler
- Habenaria backeri J.J.Sm.
- Habenaria baeuerlenii F.Muell. & Kraenzl.
- Habenaria bahiensis Schltr.
- Habenaria balansae Cogn.
- Habenaria balfouriana Schltr.
- Habenaria baliensis J.J.Sm.
- Habenaria balimensis Ormoerod
- Habenaria bangii Schltr.
- Habenaria bantamensis J.J.Sm.
- Habenaria barbata Wight ex Hook.f.
- Habenaria barbertoni Kraenzl. & Schltr.
- Habenaria barnesii Summerh. ex C.E.C.Fisch.
- Habenaria barrina Ridl.
- Habenaria batesii la Croix
- Habenaria bathiei Schltr.
- Habenaria beccarii Schltr.
- Habenaria beharensis Bosser
- Habenaria belloi Schltr.
- Habenaria bequaertii Summerm.
- Habenaria bermejoensis Schltr.
- Habenaria berroana Bar.Rodr.
- Habenaria bertauxiana Szlach. & Olszewski
- Habenaria bicolor Conrath & Kraenzl.
- Habenaria bicornis Lindl.
- Habenaria binghamii G.Will.
- Habenaria boadanensis Ames
- Habenaria boiviniana Kraenzl. & Schltr.
- Habenaria boliviana Rchb.f.
- Habenaria bonateoides Ponsie
- Habenaria bongensium Rchb.f.
- Habenaria bosseriana Szlacj. & Olszewski
- Habenaria bougainvilleae Renz
- Habenaria brachydactyla J.A.N.Bat. & Bianch.
- Habenaria brachyphylla (Lindl.) Aitch.
- Habenaria brachyphyton Schltr. ex. Mansf.
- Habenaria brachyplectron Hoehne & Schltr.
- Habenaria bracteosa Hoechst. ex A.Rich.
- Habenaria bractescens Lindl.
- Habenaria brevidens Lindl.
- Habenaria brevilabiata A.Rich. & Galeotti
- Habenaria brittoniae Ames
- Habenaria brownelliana Catling
- Habenaria bryophila J.A.N.Bat., B.L.Lau & Machado-Costa
- Habenaria buettneriana Kraenzl.
- Habenaria burtii Summerh.
- Habenaria busseana Kraenzl.
- Habenaria cadetiorum Pailler
- Habenaria caffra Schltr.
- Habenaria calcicola Aver.
- Habenaria caldensis Kraenzl.
- Habenaria calicis R.Gonzalez
- Habenaria calvilabris Summerh.
- Habenaria campylogyna J.A.N.Bat. & Bianch.
- Habenaria canastrensis J.A.N.Bat. & B.M.Carvalho
- Habenaria candolleana Cogn.
- Habenaria cardiostigmatica J.A.N.Bat. & Bianch.
- Habenaria carinata Span.
- Habenaria carlotae Dressler
- Habenaria carnea Weathers
- Habenaria carvajaliana R.Gonzalez & Cuevas-Fig.
- Habenaria casillasii R.Gonzalez & Cuevas-Fig.
- Habenaria castroi R.Gonzalez & Cuevas-Fig.
- Habenaria cataphysema Rchb.f.
- Habenaria caucana Schltr.
- Habenaria cauda-porcelli Schuit. & J.J.Verm.
- Habenaria cavatibrachia Summerh.
- Habenaria celebica Kraenzl.
- Habenaria cephalotes Lindl.
- Habenaria cerea Blatt. & McCann
- Habenaria chirensis Rchb.f.
- Habenaria chlorina C.S.P.Parish & Rchb.f.
- Habenaria chlorosepala D.L.Jones – green-hooded rein orchid
- Habenaria christianii Schltr.
- Habenaria ciliolaris Kraenzl.
- Habenaria ciliosa Lindl.
- Habenaria cirrhata (Lindl.) Rchb.f.
- Habenaria clareae Hermans
- Habenaria clavata (Lindl.) Rchb.f.
- Habenaria clypeata Lindl.
- Habenaria cochleicalcar Bosser
- Habenaria coeloglossoides Summerh.
- Habenaria cogniaxiana Kraenzl.
- Habenaria commelinifolia (Roxb.) Wall. ex Lindl.
- Habenaria comorensis H.Perrier
- Habenaria compluviosa J.A.N.Bat., B.L.Lau & Machado-Costa
- Habenaria compta Summerh.
- Habenaria congesta Ames
- Habenaria conopodes Ridl.
- Habenaria conopsea Rchb.f.
- Habenaria contrerasii R.Gonzalez & Cuevas-Fig.
- Habenaria cornuta Lindl.
- Habenaria cornutella Summerh.
- Habenaria cortesii R.Gonzalez & Cuevas-Fig.
- Habenaria corticicola W.W.Sm.
- Habenaria corydophora Rchb.f.
- Habenaria corymbosa C.S.P.Parish & Rchb.f.
- Habenaria costaricensis Schltr.
- Habenaria coultousii Barretto
- Habenaria coxipoensis Hoehne
- Habenaria crassicornis Lindl.
- Habenaria crassilabia Kraenzl.
- Habenaria cribbiana Szlach. & Olszewski
- Habenaria crinifera Lindl. – doll orchid
- Habenaria crocodilium Hermans
- Habenaria cruciata J.J.Sm.
- Habenaria crucifera Rchb.f. & Warm.
- Habenaria cruciformis Ohwi
- Habenaria cruegeri Cogn.
- Habenaria cryptophila Barb.Rodr.
- Habenaria cualensis R.Gonzalez & Cuevas-Fig.
- Habenaria cuevasiana R.Gonzalez & Cuevas-Fig.
- Habenaria culicina Rchb.f. & Warm.
- Habenaria culmiformis Schltr.
- Habenaria cultellifolia Barb.Rodr.
- Habenaria cultrata A.Rich.
- Habenaria cultriformis Kraenzl.
- Habenaria culveri Schltr.
- Habenaria curranii Ames
- Habenaria curvicalcar J.J.Sm.
- Habenaria curvilabra Barb.Rodr.
- Habenaria dalzielii Summerh.
- Habenaria davidii Franch.
- Habenaria debeerstiana Kraenzl.
- Habenaria decaptera Rchb.f.
- Habenaria decaryana H.Perrier
- Habenaria decorata Hochst. ex A.Rich.
- Habenaria decumbens S.Thomas & P.J.Cribb
- Habenaria decurvirostris Summerh.
- Habenaria delavayi Finet
- Habenaria demissa Schltr.
- Habenaria dentata (Sw.) Schltr.
- Habenaria denticulata Rchb.f.
- Habenaria dentifera C.Schweinf.
- Habenaria dentirostrata Tang & F.T.Wang
- Habenaria depressifolia Hoehne
- Habenaria devogeliana Kolan., Szlach., Kras & S.Nowak
- Habenaria dichopetala Thwaites
- Habenaria diffusa A.Rich. & Galeotti
- Habenaria digitata Lindl.
- Habenaria dinklagei Kraenzl.
- Habenaria diphylla (Nimmo) Dalzell
- Habenaria diplonema Schltr.
- Habenaria diselloides Schltr.
- Habenaria disparilis Summerh.
- Habenaria distans Griseb.
- Habenaria distantiflora A.Rich.
- Habenaria ditricha Hook.f.
- Habenaria divaricata R.S.Rogers & C.T.White
- Habenaria divergens Summerh.
- Habenaria dives Rchb.f.
- Habenaria dolichostachya Thwaites
- Habenaria dracaenifolia Schltr.
- Habenaria dregeana Lindl.
- Habenaria drepanodes Renz ex Kolan., S.Nowak & Szlach.
- Habenaria drepanopetala Pabst
- Habenaria dressleri J.M.H.Shaw
- Habenaria dryadum Schltr.
- Habenaria dusenii Schltr.
- Habenaria dutrae Schltr.
- Habenaria eatoniana R.Gonzalez & Cuevas-Fig.
- Habenaria edgarii Summerh.
- Habenaria edwallii Cogn.
- Habenaria egregia Summerh.
- Habenaria egleriana J.A.N.Bat. & Bianch.
- Habenaria ekmaniana Kraenzl.
- Habenaria elatius Ridl.
- Habenaria elliptica Wight
- Habenaria elongata R.Br. – white rein orchid
- Habenaria elwesii Hook.f.
- Habenaria engleriana Kraenzl.
- Habenaria ensifolia Lindl.
- Habenaria ensigera Renz
- Habenaria entomantha (Lex.) Lindl.
- Habenaria epipactiada Rchb.f.
- Habenaria ernesti-ulei Hoehne
- Habenaria ernestii Schltr.
- Habenaria ernstii Schltr.
- Habenaria erostrata Tang & F.T.Wang
- Habenaria espinhacensis J.A.N.Bat. & A.A.Vale
- Habenaria euryloba D.L.Jones – small rein orchid
- Habenaria eustachya Rchb.f. – woodland bog orchid
- Habenaria exaltata Barb.Rodr.
- Habenaria excelsa S.Thomas & P.J.Cribb
- Habenaria exilis D.L.Jones – wispy rein orchid
- Habenaria falcata G.Will.
- Habenaria falcatopetala Seidenf.
- Habenaria falcicornis (Lindl.) Bolus
- Habenaria falcigera Rchb.f.
- Habenaria falciloba Summerh.
- Habenaria fargesii Finet
- Habenaria felipensis Ames
- Habenaria ferdinandi Schltr. – yellow rein orchid
- Habenaria ferkoana Schltr.
- Habenaria filicornis Lindl.
- Habenaria filifera S.Watson
- Habenaria fimbriatiloba Kolan.
- Habenaria finetiana Schltr.
- Habenaria flabelliformis Summerh. ex C.E.C.Fisch.
- Habenaria flaccifolia Schltr.
- Habenaria flexuosa Lindl.
- Habenaria floribunda Lindl.
- Habenaria fluminensis Hoehne
- Habenaria foliosa A.Rich.
- Habenaria fordii Rolfe
- Habenaria foxii Ridl.
- Habenaria frappieri J.-B.Castillon & P.Bernet
- Habenaria fulva Tang & F.T.Wang
- Habenaria furcifera Lindl.
- Habenaria fuscina D.L.Jones – green rein orchid
- Habenaria galactantha Kraenzl.
- Habenaria galeandriformis Hoehne
- Habenaria galipanensis Kraenzl.
- Habenaria galpinii Bolus
- Habenaria garayana Szlach., & Olszewski
- Habenaria geerinckiana (Schaijes) Geerinck
- Habenaria genuflexa Rendle
- Habenaria gilbertii S.Thomas & P.J.Cribb
- Habenaria gibsonii Hook.f.
- Habenaria giriensis J.J.Sm.
- Habenaria glaucifolia Bureau & Franch.
- Habenaria glaucophylla Barb.Rodr.
- Habenaria glazioviana Kraenzl. ex Cogn.
- Habenaria godefroyi Rchb.f.
- Habenaria goetzeana Kraenzl.
- Habenaria gollmeri Schltr.
- Habenaria gonatosiphon Summerh.
- Habenaria gonzaleztamayoi Garcia-Cruz, R.Jimenez & L.Sanchez
- Habenaria gourlieana Gillies ex Lindl.
- Habenaria goyazensis Cogn.
- Habenaria gracilisegmenta Engels & J.A.N.Bat.
- Habenaria grandifloriformis Blatt. & McCann
- Habenaria greenwoodiana R.Gonzalez
- Habenaria guadalajarana S.Watson
- Habenaria guaraensis J.A.N.Bat. & Bianch.
- Habenaria guentheriana Kraenzl.
- Habenaria guilleminii Rchb.f.
- Habenaria gustavo-edwallii Hoehne
- Habenaria haareri Summerh.
- Habenaria habenarioides (Hoehne)R.E.Nogueira & R.J.V.Alves
- Habenaria halata D.L.Jones – sweet rein orchid
- Habenaria hallbergii Blatt. & McCann
- Habenaria hamata Barb.Rodr.
- Habenaria hannae Szlach.
- Habenaria harderi Aver & Averyanova
- Habenaria harmsiana Schltr.
- Habenaria harroldii D.L.Jones – southern rein orchid
- Habenaria hassleriana Cogn. ex Chodat & Hassl.
- Habenaria hastata Seidenf.
- Habenaria hatschbachii Pabst
- Habenaria hebes la Croix & P.J.Cribb
- Habenaria heleogena Schltr.
- Habenaria helicoplectrum Summerh.
- Habenaria henschiana Barb.Rodr.
- Habenaria heptadactyla Rchb.f.
- Habenaria heringi Pabst
- Habenaria hermannjosef-rothii Eb.Fisch., Killmann, Leh, Lebel & Delep.
- Habenaria herminioides Kraenzl.
- Habenaria hewittii Ridl.
- Habenaria hexaptera Lindl.
- Habenaria heyneana Lindl.
- Habenaria hieronymi Kraenzl.
- Habenaria hilsenbergii Ridl.
- Habenaria hippocrepica J.A.N.Bat. & Bianch.
- Habenaria hirsutissima Summerh.
- Habenaria hirsutitrunci G.Will.
- Habenaria hollandiana Santapau
- Habenaria hologlossa Summerh.
- Habenaria holothrix Schltr.
- Habenaria holotricha Gagnep.
- Habenaria holubii Rolfe
- Habenaria horaliae R.Gonzalez
- Habenaria horsfieldiana Kraenzl.
- Habenaria hosseusii Schltr.
- Habenaria huberti Carnevali & G.Morillo
- Habenaria huillensis Rchb.f.
- Habenaria humbertii Szlach. & Olszewski
- Habenaria humidicola Rolfe
- Habenaria humilior Rchb.f.
- Habenaria hydrophila Barb.Rodr.
- Habenaria hygrophila J.A.N.Bat., B.L.Lau & Machado-Costa
- Habenaria hymenophylla Schltr. – coastal rein orchid
- Habenaria ibarrae R.Gonzalez
- Habenaria ichneumonea (Sw.) Lindl.
- Habenaria idroboi Szlach. & Kolan.
- Habenaria imbricata Kraenzl.
- Habenaria inaequaliloba Schltr.
- Habenaria incarnata (Lyall ex Lindl.) Richb.f.
- Habenaria incompta Kraenzl.
- Habenaria inexspectata R.Gonzalez & Cuev.-Fig.
- Habenaria insolita Summerh.
- Habenaria insularis Schltr.
- Habenaria integrilabris J.J.Sm.
- Habenaria integripetala Cogn.
- Habenaria intermedia D.Don
- Habenaria irazuensis Schltr.
- Habenaria irwiniana J.A.N.Bat. & Bianch.
- Habenaria isoantha Schltr.
- Habenaria itaculumia Garay
- Habenaria itatiayae Schltr.
- Habenaria ituriensis (Szlach. & Olszewski) ined.
- Habenaria ixtlanensis E.W.Greenw.
- Habenaria jacobii Summerh.
- Habenaria jaegeri Summerh.
- Habenaria jaguariahyvae Kraenzl.
- Habenaria jaliscana S.Watson
- Habenaria janellehayneana Choltco, B.Maloney & Yong Gee
- Habenaria jardeliana R.Gonzalez & Cuev.-Fig.
- Habenaria javanica Kraenzl.
- Habenaria johannae Kraenzl.
- Habenaria johannensis Barb.Rodr.
- Habenaria jordanensis (Leite) Garay
- Habenaria josephensis Barb.Rodr.
- Habenaria juruenensis Hoehne
- Habenaria kabompoensis G.Will.
- Habenaria kariniae R.Gonzalez & Cuev.-Fig.
- Habenaria karstica J.A.N.Bat.
- Habenaria kassneriana Kraenzl.
- Habenaria katangensis Summerh.
- Habenaria kaeyi Summerh.
- Habenaria keniensis Summerh.
- Habenaria keralensis K.Prasad
- Habenaria keyensis Schltr.
- Habenaria khakhaengensis Makerd & Kurzweil
- Habenaria khasiana Hook.f.
- Habenaria kilimanjari Rchb.f.
- Habenaria kingii Hook.f.
- Habenaria kjellbergii J.J.Sm.
- Habenaria kleinii Menini & J.A.N.Bat.
- Habenaria kolweziensis Geerinck & Schaijes
- Habenaria koordersii J.J.Sm.
- Habenaria kornasiana Szlach.
- Habenaria kornasiorum Szlach. & Olszewski
- Habenaria korthalsiana Kraenzl.
- Habenaria kraenzliniana Schltr.
- Habenaria kraenslinii J.M.H.Shaw
- Habenaria kyimbilae Schltr.
- Habenaria laciniata Dalzell
- Habenaria lactiflora A.Rich. & Galeotti
- Habenaria laevigata Lindl.
- Habenaria lamii J.J.Sm.
- Habenaria lancifolia A.Rich.
- Habenaria langenheimii Szlach. & Kolan
- Habenaria lankesteri Ames
- Habenaria lastelleana Kraenzl.
- Habenaria laurentii De Wild.
- Habenaria lavrensis Hoehne
- Habenaria leandriana Bosser
- Habenaria lecardii Kraenzl.
- Habenaria lefebureana (A.Rich.) T.Durand & Schinz
- Habenaria lehii Eb.Fisch., Killmann, Leh, Lebel & Delep.
- Habenaria lehmanniana Kraenzl.
- Habenaria leibergii Ames
- Habenaria lelyi Summerh.
- Habenaria leon-ibarrae R.Jimenez & Carnevali
- Habenaria leonensis Kraenzl. ex T.Durand & Schinz
- Habenaria leprieurii Rchb.f.
- Habenaria leptantha Schltr.
- Habenaria leptoceras Hook.
- Habenaria leptoloba Benth.
- Habenaria leptophylla (Renz) D.L.Jones
- Habenaria letestuana Szlach. & Olszewski
- Habenaria letouzeyana (Szlach. & Olszewski) P.J.Cribb & Stevart
- Habenaria leucoceras Schltr.
- Habenaria leucosantha Barb.Rodr.
- Habenaria leucotricha Schltr.
- Habenaria lewallei Geerinck
- Habenaria libeniana Geerinck
- Habenaria ligulata C.Schweinf.
- Habenaria limprichtii Schltr.
- Habenaria lindblomii Schltr.
- Habenaria lindleyana Steud.
- Habenaria linearifolia Maxim.
- Habenaria linearis King & Pantl.
- Habenaria linguella Lindl.
- Habenaria linguicrucis Rchb.f.
- Habenaria linguiformis Summerh.
- Habenaria lingulosa Ames
- Habenaria linifolia C.Presl
- Habenaria lisenarum G.A.Romero & J.A.N.Bat.
- Habenaria lisowskiana Geerinck
- Habenaria lisowskii Szlach.
- Habenaria lithophila Schltr.
- Habenaria livingstoniana la Croix & P.J.Crib
- Habenaria lizbethae R.Gonzalez & Cuevas-Fig.
- Habenaria lobbii Rchb.f.
- Habenaria loerzingii J.J.Sm.
- Habenaria loloorum Schltr.
- Habenaria longicauda Hook.
- Habenaria longa Cordem.
- Habenaria longicauda Hook.
- Habenaria longicaudiculata J.Graham
- Habenaria longicornu Lindl.
- Habenaria longifolia Buch.-Ham. ex Lindl.
- Habenaria longipedicellata Hoehne
- Habenaria longiracema Fukuy.
- Habenaria longirostris Summerh.
- Habenaria longissima J.A.N.Bat., P.B.Meyer & Toscano
- Habenaria longitheca Seidenf.
- Habenaria lucaecapensis Fernald
- Habenaria lucida Wall. ex Lindl.
- Habenaria ludibundiciliata J.A.N.Bat. & Bianch.
- Habenaria luegiana (Kras & Szlach.) J.M.H.Shaw
- Habenaria luentensis Szlach. & Olszewski
- Habenaria luetzelburgii Schltr.
- Habenaria luquanensis G.W.Hu
- Habenaria luzmariana R.Gonzalez
- Habenaria macilenta (Lindl.) Rchb.f.
- Habenaria macraithii Lavarack - whiskered rein orchid
- Habenaria macrandra Lindl.
- Habenaria macrantha Hochst. ex A.Rich.
- Habenaria macroceratitis Willd.
- Habenaria macrodactyla Kraenzl.
- Habenaria macronectar (Vell.) Hoehne
- Habenaria macroplectron Schltr.
- Habenaria macrostachya Lindl.
- Habenaria macrostele Summerh.
- Habenaria macrotidion Summerh.
- Habenaria macrura Kraenzl.
- Habenaria macruroides Summerh.
- Habenaria maculosa Lindl.
- Habenaria macvaughiana R.Gonzalez
- Habenaria maderoi Schltr.
- Habenaria magdalenensis Hoehne
- Habenaria magistrae Carvajal & L.M.González
- Habenaria magnibracteata R.Gonzalez & Cuev.-Fig.
- Habenaria magnifica Fritsch
- Habenaria magnirostris Summerh.
- Habenaria magniscutata Catling
- Habenaria mairei Schltr.
- Habenaria maitlandii Summerh.
- Habenaria malacophylla Rchb.f.
- Habenaria malaisseana Geerinck
- Habenaria malintana (Blanco) Merr.
- Habenaria malipoensis Q.Liu & W.L.Zhang
- Habenaria malleifera Hook.f.
- Habenaria mandersii Collett & Hemsl.
- Habenaria mannii Hook.f.
- Habenaria marginata Colebr.
- Habenaria mariae R.Gonzalez & Cuev.-Fig.
- Habenaria marquisensis F.Br.
- Habenaria massoniana King & Pantl.
- Habenaria matudae Salazar
- Habenaria mechowii Rchb.f.
- Habenaria mediocris Dressler
- Habenaria medioflexa Turrill
- Habenaria medusa Kraenzl.
- Habenaria meeana Toscano
- Habenaria megapotamensis Hoehne
- Habenaria mello-barretoi Brade & Pabst
- Habenaria melvillei Ridl.
- Habenaria mesodactyla Griseb.
- Habenaria mesophylla Kraenzl.
- Habenaria micheliana R.Gonzalez & Cuev.-Fig.
- Habenaria micholitziana Kraenzl. & Schltr.
- Habenaria microceras Hook.f.
- Habenaria microsaccus Kraenzl.
- Habenaria microstylina Rchb.f.
- Habenaria mientienensis Tang & F.T.Wang
- Habenaria millei Schltr.
- Habenaria minima R.Gonzalez & Cuev.-Fig.
- Habenaria minuta J.A.N.Bat. & Bianch.
- Habenaria mira Summerh.
- Habenaria mirabilis Rolfe
- Habenaria mitodes Garay 7 W.Kittr.
- Habenaria modesta Danzell
- Habenaria modestissima Rchb.f.
- Habenaria monadenioides Schltr.
- Habenaria monorrhiza (Sw.) Rchb.f. – tropical bog orchid
- Habenaria montevidensis Spreng.
- Habenaria montis-wilhelminae Renz
- Habenaria montolivaea Kraenzl. ex Engl.
- Habenaria mosambicensis Schltr.
- Habenaria mossii (G.Will.) J.C.Manning
- Habenaria multicaudata Sedgw.
- Habenaria multipartita Blume ex Kraenzl.
- Habenaria muricata (Schauer) Rchb.f.
- Habenaria myodes Summerh.
- Habenaria myriotricha Gagnep.
- Habenaria mystacina Lindl.
- Habenaria nalbesiensis J.J.Sm.
- Habenaria nasuta Rchb.f. & Warm.
- Habenaria nautiloides H.Perrier
- Habenaria ndiana Rendle
- Habenaria nematocerata Tang & F.T.Wang
- Habenaria nemorosa Barb.Rodr.
- Habenaria nicholsonii Rolfe
- Habenaria nicobarica Murugan, Alappatt, S.Prabhu & Arisdason
- Habenaria nigerica Summerh.
- Habenaria nigrescens Summerh.
- Habenaria nilssonii Foldats
- Habenaria njamnjamica Kraenzl.
- Habenaria nogeirana R.Gonzalez & Cuev.-Fig.
- Habenaria norae R.González & Cuev.-Fig.
- Habenaria notabilis Schltr.
- Habenaria novae-hiberniae Schltr.
- Habenaria novaesii Edwall & Hoehne
- Habenaria novemfida Lindl.
- Habenaria nuda Lindl.
- Habenaria nyikana Rchb.f.
- Habenaria nyikensis G.Will.
- Habenaria obovata Summerh.
- Habenaria obtusa Lindl.
- Habenaria ocadiziana J.M.Peinado-A.
- Habenaria occidentalis (Lindl.) Summerh.
- Habenaria occlusa Summerh.
- Habenaria ochroleuca R.Br. – sickle orchid
- Habenaria odorata Schltr.
- Habenaria oerstedii Rchb.f.
- Habenaria ofeliae R.Gonzalez & Cuev.-Fig.
- Habenaria omissa J.A.N.Bat. & Bianch.
- Habenaria orchiocalcar Hoehne
- Habenaria oreophila Greenm.
- Habenaria orthocentron P.J.Cribb
- Habenaria ortiziana
- Habenaria osmastonii Karthig.
- Habenaria ospinae Szlach. & Kolan.
- Habenaria pabstii J.A.N.Bat. & Bianch.
- Habenaria paivaeana Rchb.f.
- Habenaria pallideviridis Seidenf. ex K.M.Matthew
- Habenaria palpensis Roskoti
- Habenaria paningrahiana S.Misra
- Habenaria pansarinii J.A.N.Bat. & Bianch.
- Habenaria pantlingiana Kraenzl.
- Habenaria papyracea Scgltr.
- Habenaria paradiseoides J.J.Sm.
- Habenaria paranaensis Barb.Rodr.
- Habenaria parva (Summerh.) Summerh.
- Habenaria parvicalcarata C.Schweinf.
- Habenaria parvidens Lindl.
- Habenaria parviflora Lindl.
- Habenaria parvipetala J.J.Sm.
- Habenaria pasmithii G.Will.
- Habenaria patentiloba Ames
- Habenaria paucipartita J.J.Sm.
- Habenaria paulensis Porsch
- Habenaria paulistana J.A.N.Bat. & Bianch.
- Habenaria pauper Summerh.
- Habenaria paxamorque Léotard & Galliffet
- Habenaria pectinata
- Habenaria pentadactyla Lindl.
- Habenaria perbella Rchb.f.
- Habenaria perezii R.Gonzalez & Cuev.-Fig.
- Habenaria peristyloides A.Rich.
- Habenaria periyarensis Sasidh., K.P.Rajesh & Augustine
- Habenaria perpulchra Kraenzl.
- Habenaria perrottetiana A.Rich.
- Habenaria petalodes Lindl.
- Habenaria petelotii Gagnep.
- Habenaria petitiana (A.Rich.) T.Durand & Schinz
- Habenaria petraea Renz & Grosvenor
- Habenaria petrogeiton Schltr.
- Habenaria petromedusa Webb
- Habenaria phantasma la Croix
- Habenaria phylacocheira Summerh.
- Habenaria physuriformis Kraenzl.
- Habenaria pilosa Schltr.
- Habenaria pinnatipartita J.J.Sm.
- Habenaria pinzonii R.Gonzalez & Cuev.-Fig.
- Habenaria piraquarensis Hoehne
- Habenaria plantaginea Lindl.
- Habenaria platanthera Rchb.f.
- Habenaria platantheroides Schltr.
- Habenaria platyanthera Richb.f.
- Habenaria plectromaniaca Rchb.f. & S.Moore
- Habenaria pleiophylla Hoehne & Schltr.
- Habenaria plurifoliata Tang & F.T.Wang
- Habenaria poilanei Gagnep.
- Habenaria polycarpa Hoehne
- Habenaria polygonoides Schltr.
- Habenaria polyodon Hook.f.
- Habenaria polyrhiza Schltr.
- Habenaria polyschista Schltr.
- Habenaria polytricha Rolfe
- Habenaria porphyricola Schltr.
- Habenaria praelta (Thouars) Spreng.
- Habenaria praecox Lavarack & A.W.Dockrill – early rein orchid
- Habenaria praestans Rendle
- Habenaria praetermissa Seidenf.
- Habenaria pratensis (Lindl.) Rchb.f.
- Habenaria prazeri King & Pantl.
- Habenaria pringlei B.L.Rob.
- Habenaria prionocraspedon Summerh.
- Habenaria procera (Afzel. ex Sw.) Lindl.
- Habenaria propinquior Rchb.f. – common rein orchid
- Habenaria protusorostrata R.Gonzalez & Cuev.-Fig.
- Habenaria psammophila J.A.N.Bat., Bianch. & B.M.Carvalho
- Habenaria pseudocaldensis Kraenzl.
- Habenaria pseudociliosa Schelpe ex J.C.Manning
- Habenaria pseudoculicina J.A.N.Bat. & B.M.Carvalho
- Habenaria pseudofilifera R.Gonzalez & Cuev.-Fig.
- Habenaria pseudoglaucophylla J.A.N.Bat., R.C.Mota & N.Abreu
- Habenaria pseudohamata Toscana
- Habenaria pseudoplatycoryne (Szlach. & Olszewski) ined.
- Habenaria pseudorostellifera Kolan., Szlach. & Kras
- Habenaria pterocarpa Thwaites
- Habenaria pubescens Lindl.
- Habenaria pubidactyla J.A.N.Bat. & Bianch.
- Habenaria pubidens P.J.Cribb
- Habenaria pubipetala Summerh.
- Habenaria pumila Poepp.
- Habenaria pumiloides C.Schweinf.
- Habenaria pungens Cogn. ex Kuntze
- Habenaria pycnostachya Barb.Rodr.
- Habenaria pygmaea C.Schweinf. & R.E.Schult.
- Habenaria quadrata Lindl.
- Habenaria quadriferricola J.A.N.Bat. & B.M.Carvalho
- Habenaria quartiana A.Rich.
- Habenaria quartzicola Schltr.
- Habenaria quinquecarinata R.Gonzalez & Cuev.-Fig.
- Habenaria quinqueseta (Michx.) Eaton – longhorn bog orchid
- Habenaria ramayyana Ram.Chary & J.J.Wood
- Habenaria rangatensis M.C.Naik & K.Prasad
- Habenaria rariflora A.Ricj.
- Habenaria rautaneniana Kraenzl.
- Habenaria rechingeri Renz
- Habenaria reflexa Blume
- Habenaria reflexicalcar J.A.N.Bat. & B.M.Carvalho
- Habenaria regnellii Cogn.
- Habenaria reniformis (D.Don) Hook.f.
- Habenaria renziana Szlach. & Olszewski
- Habenaria repens Nutt. – waterspider bog orchid
- Habenaria retinervis Summerh.
- Habenaria retroflexa F.Muell. & Kraenzl.
- Habenaria rhodocheila Hance
- Habenaria rhopalostigma Rolfe ex Kraenzl.
- Habenaria rhynchocarpa (Thwaites) Trimen
- Habenaria richardiana Wight
- Habenaria richardsiae Summerh.
- Habenaria ridleyana Kraenzl.
- Habenaria riparia Renz & Grosvenor
- Habenaria rivae Kraenzl.
- Habenaria robbrechtiana Geerink & Schaijes
- Habenaria robinsonii Ames
- Habenaria robusta Welw. ex Rchb.f.
- Habenaria robustior (Wight) Hook.f.
- Habenaria rodeiensis Barb.Rodr.
- Habenaria rodgeri W.W.Sm. & S.C.Banerji
- Habenaria rodriguesii Cogn.
- Habenaria roemeriana T.Durand & Schinz
- Habenaria rolfeana Schltr.
- Habenaria roraimensis Rolfe
- Habenaria rosilloana R.Gonzalez
- Habenaria rostellifera Rchb.f.
- Habenaria rostrata Wall. ex Lindl.
- Habenaria rosulata Ames
- Habenaria rosulifolia Espejo & Lopez-Ferr.
- Habenaria rotundiloba Pabst
- Habenaria roxburghii Nicolson
- Habenaria ruizii R.Gonzalez
- Habenaria rumphii (Brongn.) Lindl. – stiff rein orchid
- Habenaria rupestris Poepp. & Endl.
- Habenaria rupicola Barb.Rodr.
- Habenaria rzedowskiana R.Gonzalez
- Habenaria rzedowskii R.Gonzalez
- Habenaria sagittifera Rchb.f.
- Habenaria sahyadrica K.M.P.Kumar, Nirmesh, V.B.Sreek & Kumar
- Habenaria salaccensis Blume
- Habenaria samoensis F.Muell. & Kraenzl.
- Habenaria sampaioana Schltr.
- Habenaria sandiegoensis Roskoti
- Habenaria sandfordiana Szlach. & Olszewski
- Habenaria santanae R.Gonzalez & Cuev.-Fig.
- Habenaria santensis Barb.Rodr.
- Habenaria saprophytica Bosser & P.J.Cribb
- Habenaria sartor Lindl.
- Habenaria sastrei Szlach. & Kolan.
- Habenaria sceptrophora Garay
- Habenaria schaffneri S.Watson
- Habenaria schaijesii Geerinck
- Habenaria schenckii Cogn.
- Habenaria schimperiana Hochst, ex A.Rich.
- Habenaria schindleri Schltr.
- Habenaria schomburgkii Lindl.
- Habenaria schultzei Schltr.
- Habenaria sebastianensis R.González & Cuev.-Fig.
- Habenaria secunda Lindl.
- Habenaria secundiflora Barb.Rodr.
- Habenaria setacea Lindl.
- Habenaria seticauda Lindl.
- Habenaria setifolia Carr
- Habenaria shweliensis W.W.Sm. & Banerji
- Habenaria siamensis Schltr.
- Habenaria sigillum Thoars
- Habenaria silvatica Schltr.
- Habenaria simillima Rchb.f.
- Habenaria simplex Kraenzl.
- Habenaria singapurensis Ridl.
- Habenaria singularis Summerh.
- Habenaria smithii Schltr.
- Habenaria snowdenii Summerh.
- Habenaria sobraliana J.A.N.Bat., Vale & Menini
- Habenaria sochensis Rchb.f.
- Habenaria socialis Fawc. & Rendle
- Habenaria socorroae R.Gonzalez & Cuev.-Fig.
- Habenaria socotrana Balf.f.
- Habenaria spanophytica J.A.N.Blanch. & Bianch.
- Habenaria spathiphylla J.J.Sm.
- Habenaria spathulifera Cogn.
- Habenaria spatulifolia C.S.P.Parish & Rchb.f.
- Habenaria speciosa Poepp. & Endl.
- Habenaria spencei Blatt. & McCann
- Habenaria spithamaea Schltr.
- Habenaria splendens Rendle
- Habenaria splendentior Summerh.
- Habenaria sprucei Cogn.
- Habenaria st-simonensis Hoehne
- Habenaria stanislawii (Kras & Szlach.) J.M.H.Shaw
- Habenaria stenoceras Summerh.
- Habenaria stenochila Lindl.
- Habenaria stenopetala Lindl.
- Habenaria stenophylla Summerh.
- Habenaria stenorhynchos Schltr.
- Habenaria stolzii Schltr.
- Habenaria strangulans Summerh.
- Habenaria strictissima Rchb.f.
- Habenaria stylites Rchb.f. & S.Moore
- Habenaria suaveolens Dalzell
- Habenaria subaequalis Summerh.
- Habenaria subandina Schltr.
- Habenaria subarmata Rchb.f.
- Habenaria subauriculata B.L.Rob. & Greenm.
- Habenaria subfiliformis Cogn.
- Habenaria subrepens J.A.N.Bat., B.L.Lau & Machado-Costa
- Habenaria subviridis Hoehne & Schltr.
- Habenaria superflua Rchb.f.
- Habenaria supervacanea Rchb.f.
- Habenaria supplicans Summerh.
- Habenaria sylvicultrix Lindl. ex Kraenzl.
- Habenaria szechuanica Schltr.
- Habenaria szlachetkoana R.Gonzalez & Cuev.-Fig.
- Habenaria taeniodema Summerh.
- Habenaria tahitensis Nadeaud
- Habenaria talaensis R.Gonzalez & Cuev.-Fig.
- Habenaria tamanduensis Schltr.
- Habenaria tamazulensis R.Gonzalez & Cuev.-Fig.
- Habenaria tanzaniyana J.M.H.Shaw
- Habenaria taubertiana Cogn.
- Habenaria tentaculigera Rchb.f.
- Habenaria tequiliana R.Gonzalez & Cuev.-Fig.
- Habenaria teresae R.Gonzalez & Cuev.-Fig.
- Habenaria ternatea Rchb.f.
- Habenaria tetraceras Summerh.
- Habenaria tetranema Schltr.
- Habenaria thailandica Seidenf.
- Habenaria theodori Schltr.
- Habenaria thomana Rchb.f.
- Habenaria thomsonii Rchb.f.
- Habenaria tianae P.J.Cribb & D.L.Roberts
- Habenaria tibetica Schltr.
- Habenaria tisserantii Szlach. & Olszewski
- Habenaria tomentella Rchb.f.
- Habenaria tonkinensis Seidenf.
- Habenaria torricellensis Schltr.
- Habenaria tortilis P.J.Cribb
- Habenaria tosariensis J.J.Sm.
- Habenaria trachypetala Kraenzl.
- Habenaria transvaalensis Schltr.
- Habenaria trichaete Schltr.
- Habenaria trichoceras Barb.Rodr.
- Habenaria trichoglossa Renz
- Habenaria trichosantha Lindl.
- Habenaria tricruris (A.Rich.) Rchb.f.
- Habenaria tridactylites Lindl.
- Habenaria tridens Lindl.
- Habenaria trifida Kunth
- Habenaria trifurcata Hook.f.
- Habenaria trilobulata Schltr.
- Habenaria triphylla D.Subram.
- Habenaria triquetra Rolfe
- Habenaria tropophila H.Perrier
- Habenaria truncata Lindl.
- Habenaria tsaiana T.P.Lin
- Habenaria tsaratananensis H.Perrier
- Habenaria tubifolia la Croix & P.J.Cribb
- Habenaria tuerckheimii Schltr.
- Habenaria tweedieae Summerh.
- Habenaria tysonii Bolus
- Habenaria ugandensis Summerh.
- Habenaria uhehensis Schltr.
- Habenaria ulei Cogn.
- Habenaria uliginosa Rchb.f.
- Habenaria umbraticola Barb.Rodr.
- Habenaria uncata R.Jiminez, L.Sanchez & Garcia-Cruz
- Habenaria uncatiloba C.Schweinf.
- Habenaria uncicalcar Summerh.
- Habenaria uncinata Szlach. & Olszewski
- Habenaria undatifolia Ormerod & Juswara
- Habenaria undulata Frapp. ex Cordem.
- Habenaria unellezii Foldats
- Habenaria unguilabris B.R.Adams
- Habenaria unifoliata Summerh.
- Habenaria urbaniana Cogn.
- Habenaria vaginata A.Rich.
- Habenaria vandenbergheniana Geerinck
- Habenaria vanoverberghii Ames
- Habenaria variabilis Ridl.
- Habenaria variegata Cuev.-Fig.
- Habenaria vasquezii Dodson
- Habenaria vatia D.L.Jones – curved rein orchid
- Habenaria velutina Summerh.
- Habenaria verdickii (De Wild.) Schltr.
- Habenaria verdickii (De Wild.) Schltr.
- Habenaria vermeuleniana Geerinck & Schaijes
- Habenaria vesiculosa A.Rich.
- Habenaria vidua C.S.P.Parish & Rchb.f.
- Habenaria villosa Rolfe
- Habenaria virens A.Rich. & Galeotti
- Habenaria viridiflora (Rottler ex Sw.) R.Br. ex Spreng.
- Habenaria vollesenii S.Thomas & P.J.Cribb
- Habenaria walleri Rchb.f.
- Habenaria wallichii (Kolan. Kras & Szlach.) J.M.H.Shaw
- Habenaria wangii Ormerod
- Habenaria warburgana Kraenzl.
- Habenaria warmingii Rchb.f. & Warm.
- Habenaria warszewiczii Schltr.
- Habenaria weberiana Schltr.
- Habenaria weileriana Schltr.
- Habenaria welwitschii Rchb.f.
- Habenaria wercklei Schltr.
- Habenaria williamsii Schltr.
- Habenaria wolongensis K.Y.Lang
- Habenaria woodii Schltr.
- Habenaria xanthantha F.Muell. – freak rein orchid
- Habenaria xanthochlora Schltr.
- Habenaria xochitliae R.Gonzalez
- Habenaria yezoensis H.Hara
- Habenaria yomensis Gage
- Habenaria yookuaaensis Meija-Marin, Espejo, Lopez-Ferr. & R.Jiminez
- Habenaria yueana Tang & F.T.Wang
- Habenaria yungasensis Schltr.
- Habenaria zambesina Rchb.f.
- Habenaria zamudioana R.Gonzalez
- Habenaria zapopana R.Gonzalez & Cuev.-Fig.
- Habenaria zollingeri Rchb.f.

== Formerly placed here ==
- Dactylorhiza viridis (L.) R.M.Bateman et al. (as H. viridis (L.) R.Br.)
- Platanthera ciliaris (L.) Lindl. (as H. ciliaris (L.) R.Br.)
- Platanthera dilatata (Pursh) Lindl. ex L.C.Beck (as H. dilatata (Pursh) Hook.)
- Platanthera hyperborea (L.) Lindl. (as H. hyperborea (L.) R.Br.)
- Platanthera psycodes (L.) Lindl. (as H. psycodes (L.) Spreng.)
- Platanthera stricta Lindl. (as H. saccata Greene)
