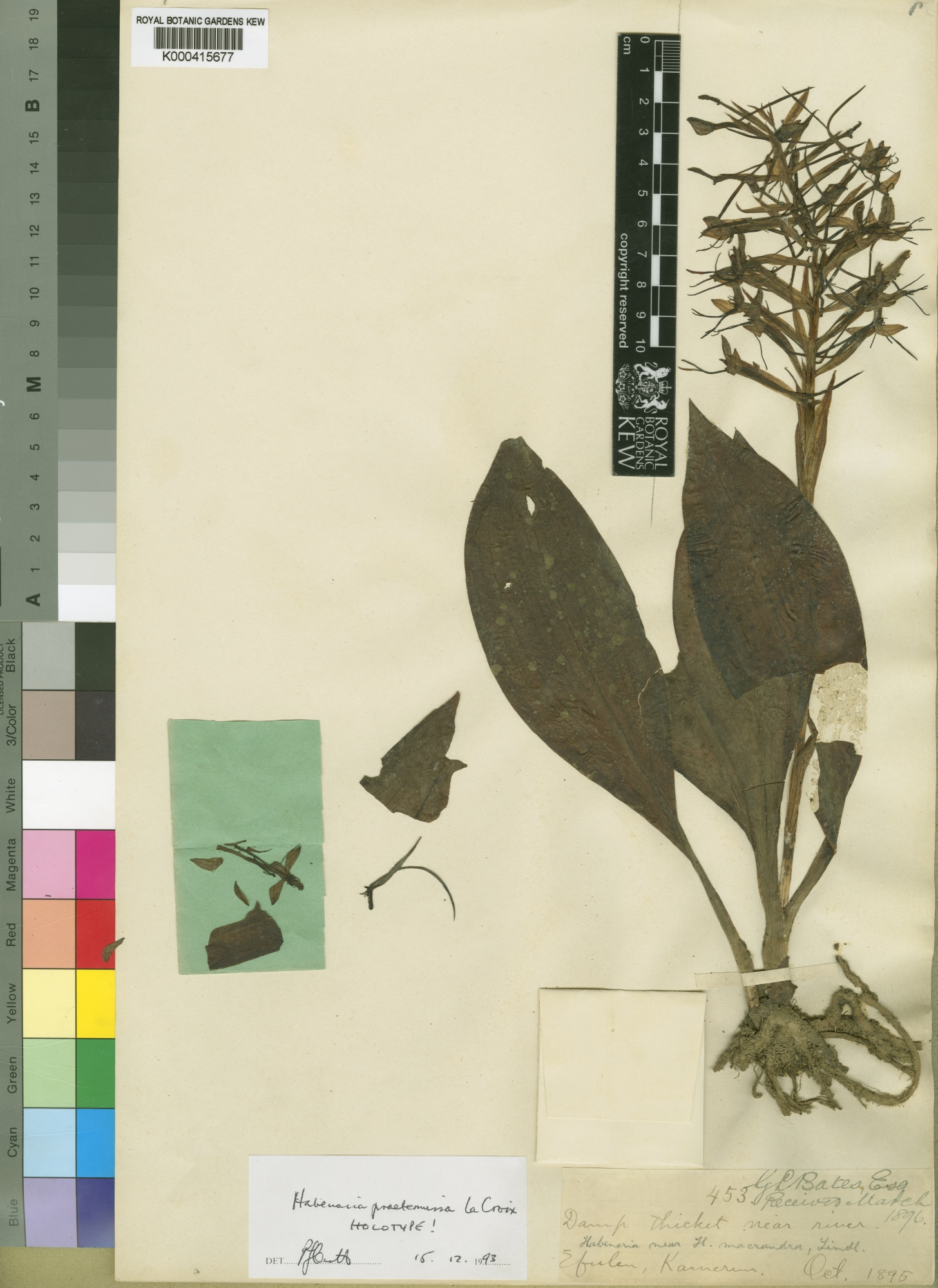

Conservation status
- Endangered (IUCN 3.1)
- CITES Appendix II

Scientific classification
- Kingdom: Plantae
- Clade: Tracheophytes
- Clade: Angiosperms
- Clade: Monocots
- Order: Asparagales
- Family: Orchidaceae
- Subfamily: Orchidoideae
- Genus: Habenaria
- Species: H. batesii

Binomial name
- Habenaria batesii la Croix

Synonyms
- Habenaria praetermissa la Croix; Podandriella batesii (la Croix) Szlach. & Olszewski

= Habenaria batesii =

Species of flowering plant

Habenaria batesii is a species of plant in the family Orchidaceae. It is endemic to Cameroon. Its natural habitat is subtropical or tropical moist lowland forests. It is threatened by habitat loss.
