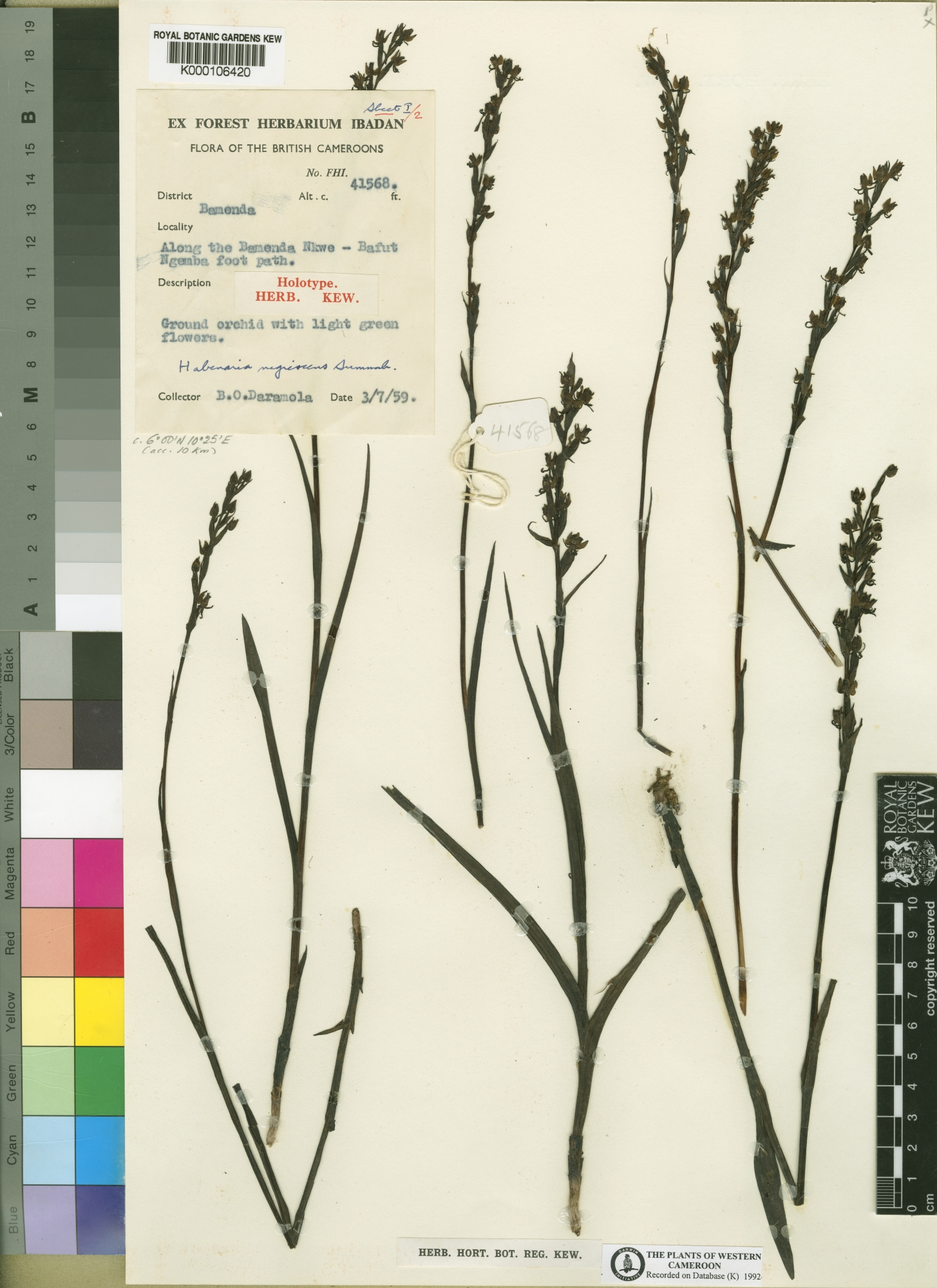

Conservation status
- Vulnerable (IUCN 3.1)
- CITES Appendix II

Scientific classification
- Kingdom: Plantae
- Clade: Tracheophytes
- Clade: Angiosperms
- Clade: Monocots
- Order: Asparagales
- Family: Orchidaceae
- Subfamily: Orchidoideae
- Genus: Habenaria
- Species: H. nigrescens

Binomial name
- Habenaria nigrescens Summerh.

Synonyms
- Roeperocharis nigrescens (Summerh.) Szlach. & Olszewski

= Habenaria nigrescens =

Species of flowering plant

Habenaria nigrescens is a species of plant in the family Orchidaceae. It is found in Cameroon and Nigeria. Its natural habitat is subtropical or tropical high-altitude grassland. It is threatened by habitat loss.
