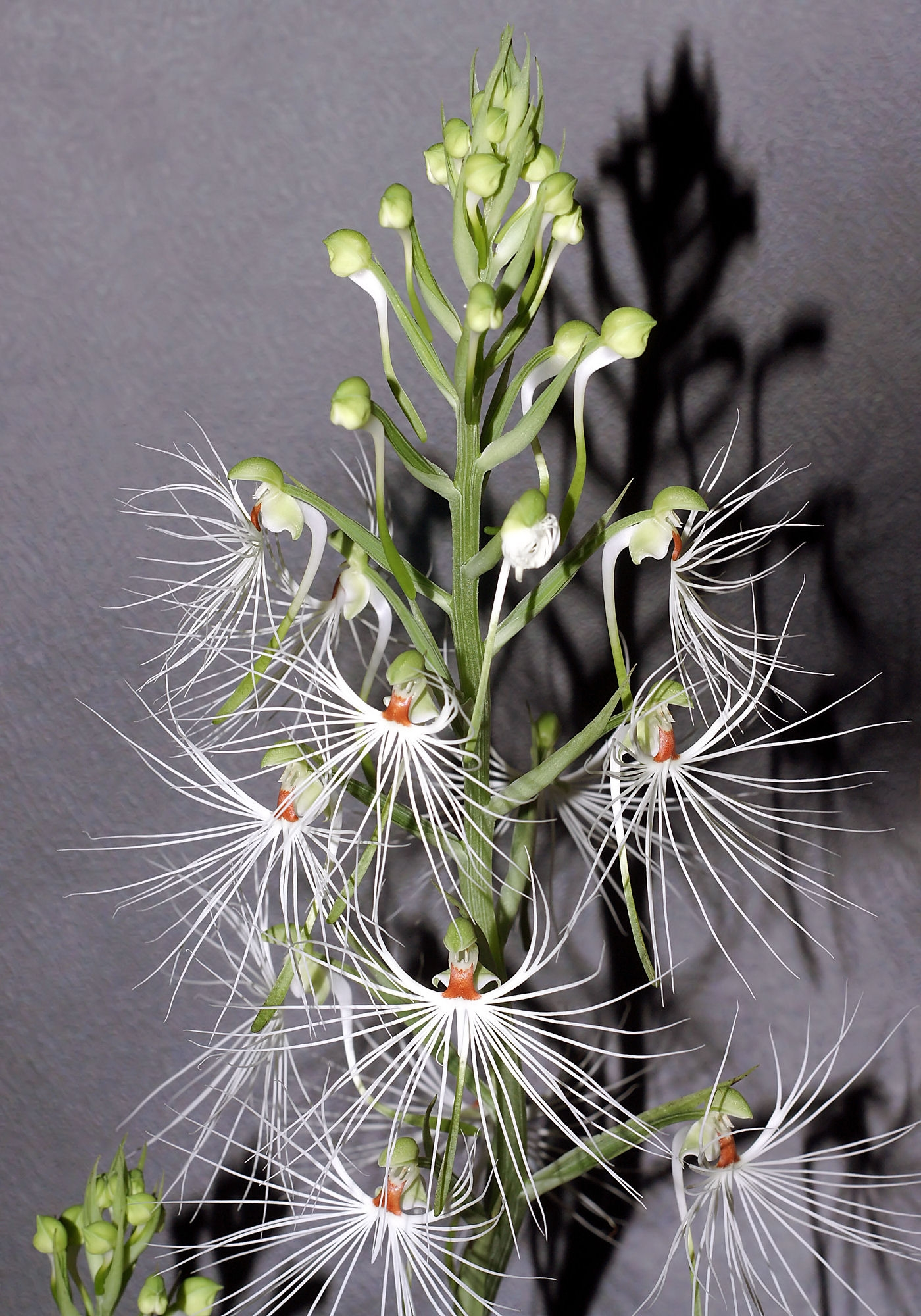

Conservation status
- CITES Appendix II (CITES)

Scientific classification
- Kingdom: Plantae
- Clade: Tracheophytes
- Clade: Angiosperms
- Clade: Monocots
- Order: Asparagales
- Family: Orchidaceae
- Subfamily: Orchidoideae
- Genus: Habenaria
- Species: H. myriotricha

Binomial name
- Habenaria myriotricha Gagnep.

Synonyms
- Fimbrorchis myriotricha (Gagnep.) Szlach.; Pecteilis myriotricha (Gagnep.) M.A.Clem. & D.L.Jones

= Habenaria myriotricha =

Species of orchid

Habenaria myriotricha is a species of orchid native to China, Laos, Myanmar, Thailand, and Vietnam.

== Distribution and habitat ==
Habenaria myriotricha is known from Yunnan province in southern China, the Tanintharyi Region in southern Myanmar, northern Thailand, Laos, and Vietnam. It grows in damp rocky areas and damp areas of the forest floor.
