= Habenaria thomana =

Conservation status
- Vulnerable (IUCN 3.1)
- CITES Appendix II

Scientific classification
- Kingdom: Plantae
- Clade: Tracheophytes
- Clade: Angiosperms
- Clade: Monocots
- Order: Asparagales
- Family: Orchidaceae
- Subfamily: Orchidoideae
- Genus: Habenaria
- Species: H. thomana

Binomial name
- Habenaria thomana Rchb.f.

Species of flowering plant

Habenaria thomana is a species of plant in the family Orchidaceae. It is found in Cameroon, Equatorial Guinea (on the island of Bioko), and São Tomé Island. Its natural habitat is subtropical or tropical moist lowland forests. It is threatened by habitat loss.

== Description ==
The orchid grows on the ground and has short stems, up to 4 cm long. It has 4-10 leaves, 11–19 cm long and 4–4.5 cm wide. Its 14-30 whitish to greenish flowers stand in terminal racemes.
