= Habenaria obovata =

Conservation status
- Endangered (IUCN 3.1)
- CITES Appendix II

Scientific classification
- Kingdom: Plantae
- Clade: Tracheophytes
- Clade: Angiosperms
- Clade: Monocots
- Order: Asparagales
- Family: Orchidaceae
- Subfamily: Orchidoideae
- Genus: Habenaria
- Species: H. obovata

Binomial name
- Habenaria obovata Summerh.

Synonyms
- Roeperocharis occidentalis Kraenzl.; Pseudocoeloglossum occidentale (Kraenzl.) Szlach.

Species of flowering plant

Habenaria obovata is a species of plant in the family Orchidaceae. It is endemic to Cameroon. Its natural habitat is subtropical or tropical dry lowland grassland.
