= Habenaria euryloba =

Small rein orchid

Scientific classification
- Kingdom: Plantae
- Clade: Tracheophytes
- Clade: Angiosperms
- Clade: Monocots
- Order: Asparagales
- Family: Orchidaceae
- Subfamily: Orchidoideae
- Tribe: Orchideae
- Subtribe: Orchidinae
- Genus: Habenaria
- Species: H. euryloba

Binomial name
- Habenaria euryloba D.L.Jones

Species of orchid

Habenaria euryloba, commonly known as the small rein orchid, is a species of orchid that is endemic to a small area in far north Queensland. It has two or three leaves at its base and up to twenty small white flowers with a trident-like labellum.

== Description ==
Habenaria euryloba is a tuberous, perennial herb with two or three leaves at its base, the leaves 70–110 mm (3–4 in) long and 8–11 mm (0.3–0.4 in) wide. Between eight and twenty white flowers, 8–10 mm (0.3–0.4 in) long and 10–12 mm (0.4–0.5 in) wide are borne on a flowering stem 250–500 mm (10–20 in) tall. The dorsal sepal and petals are 4–5 mm (0.16–0.20 in) long and about 2–3 mm (0.08–0.1 in) wide and joined at their bases to form a hood over the column. The lateral sepals are 5–6 mm (0.20–0.24 in) long, about 2.5 mm (0.1 in) wide, turn downwards and spread widely apart from each other. The labellum is 6–7.5 mm (0.24–0.30 in) long and wide with three lobes appearing like a trident. The middle lobe is about 4 mm (0.2 in) long and 2 mm (0.08 in) wide while the side lobes are much narrower and slightly shorter. The nectary spur is straight, white with a green tip, 6–8 mm (0.2–0.3 in) long and about 2.5 mm (0.1 in) wide. Flowering occurs between December and February.

== Taxonomy and naming ==
Habenaria euryloba was first formally described in 1998 by David Jones from a specimen collected near Cooktown in 1992 and the description was published in The Orchadian. The specific epithet (euryloba) is derived from the Ancient Greek words eurys meaning "broad", "wide" or "widespread" and lobos meaning "a rounded projection or protuberance".

== Distribution and habitat ==
The small rein has a narrow distribution near Cooktown where it grows with sedges and rushes in summer-wet swamps and Melaleuca viridiflora wetland.
