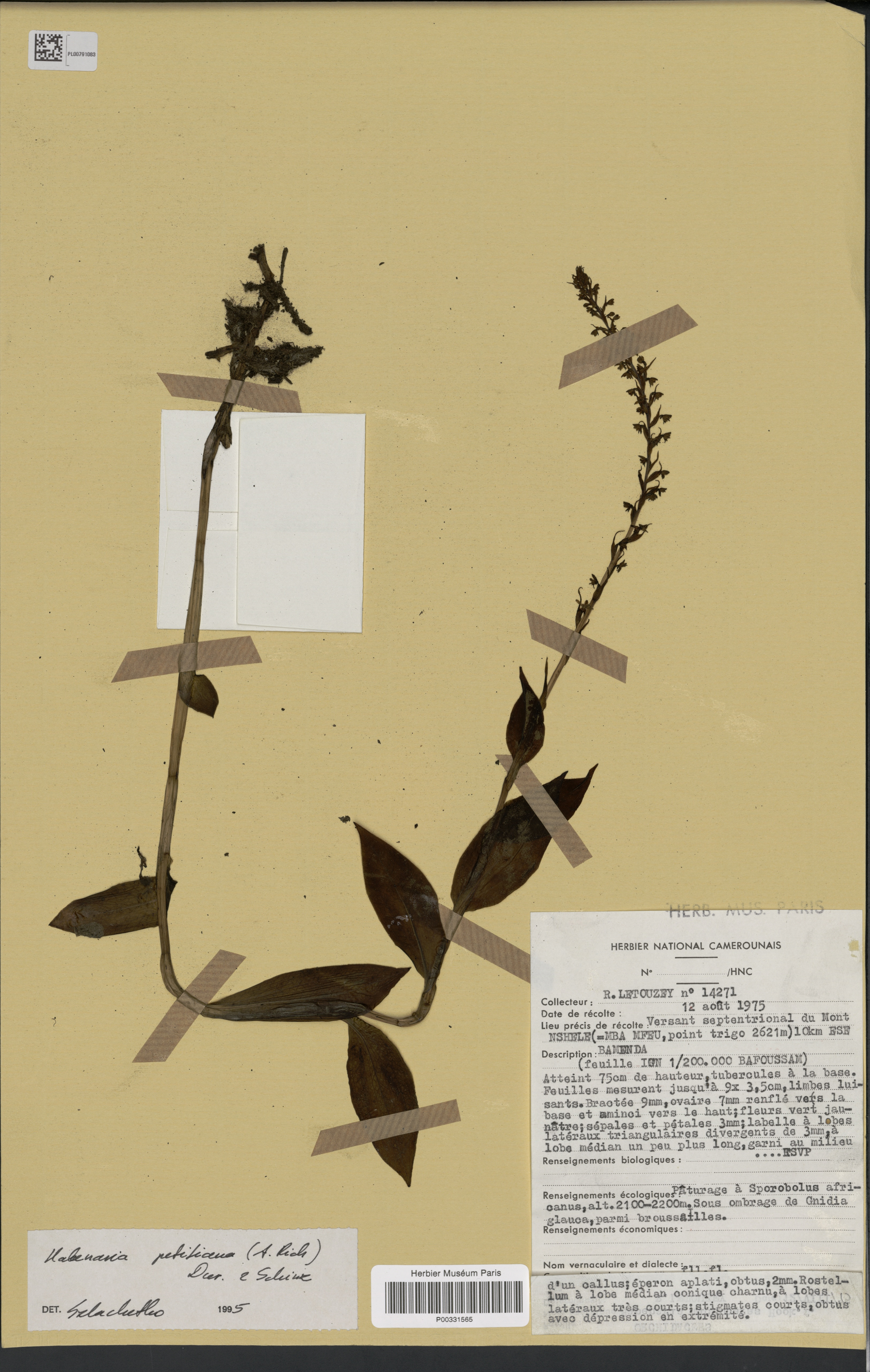

Conservation status
- Near Threatened (IUCN 2.3)
- CITES Appendix II

Scientific classification
- Kingdom: Plantae
- Clade: Tracheophytes
- Clade: Angiosperms
- Clade: Monocots
- Order: Asparagales
- Family: Orchidaceae
- Subfamily: Orchidoideae
- Genus: Habenaria
- Species: H. microceras

Binomial name
- Habenaria microceras Hook.f.

Synonyms
- Platanthera preussii Kraenzl.; Peristylus preussii (Kraenzl.) Rolfe; Pseudoperistylus microceras (Hook.f.) Szlach. & Olszewski; Montolivaea microceras (Hook.f.) Szlach.

= Habenaria microceras =

Species of flowering plant

Habenaria microceras is a species of plant in the family Orchidaceae. It is found in Cameroon and Equatorial Guinea. Its natural habitat is subtropical or tropical dry forests.
