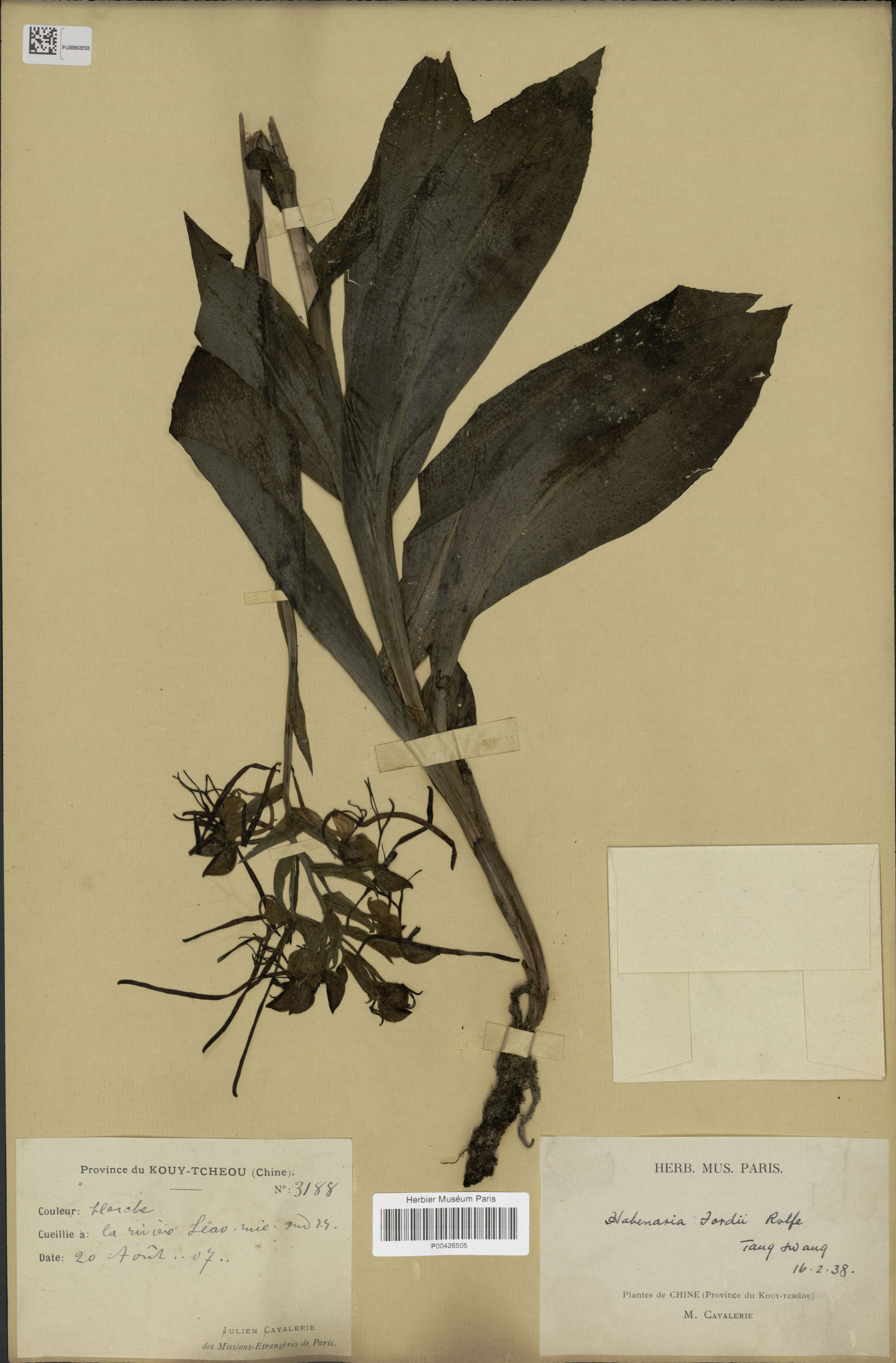

Conservation status
- Vulnerable (IUCN 3.1)

Scientific classification
- Kingdom: Plantae
- Clade: Tracheophytes
- Clade: Angiosperms
- Clade: Monocots
- Order: Asparagales
- Family: Orchidaceae
- Subfamily: Orchidoideae
- Genus: Habenaria
- Species: H. fordii

Binomial name
- Habenaria fordii Rolfe

= Habenaria fordii =

Species of flowering plant

Habenaria fordii is a species of plant in the family Orchidaceae. It is endemic to China.
