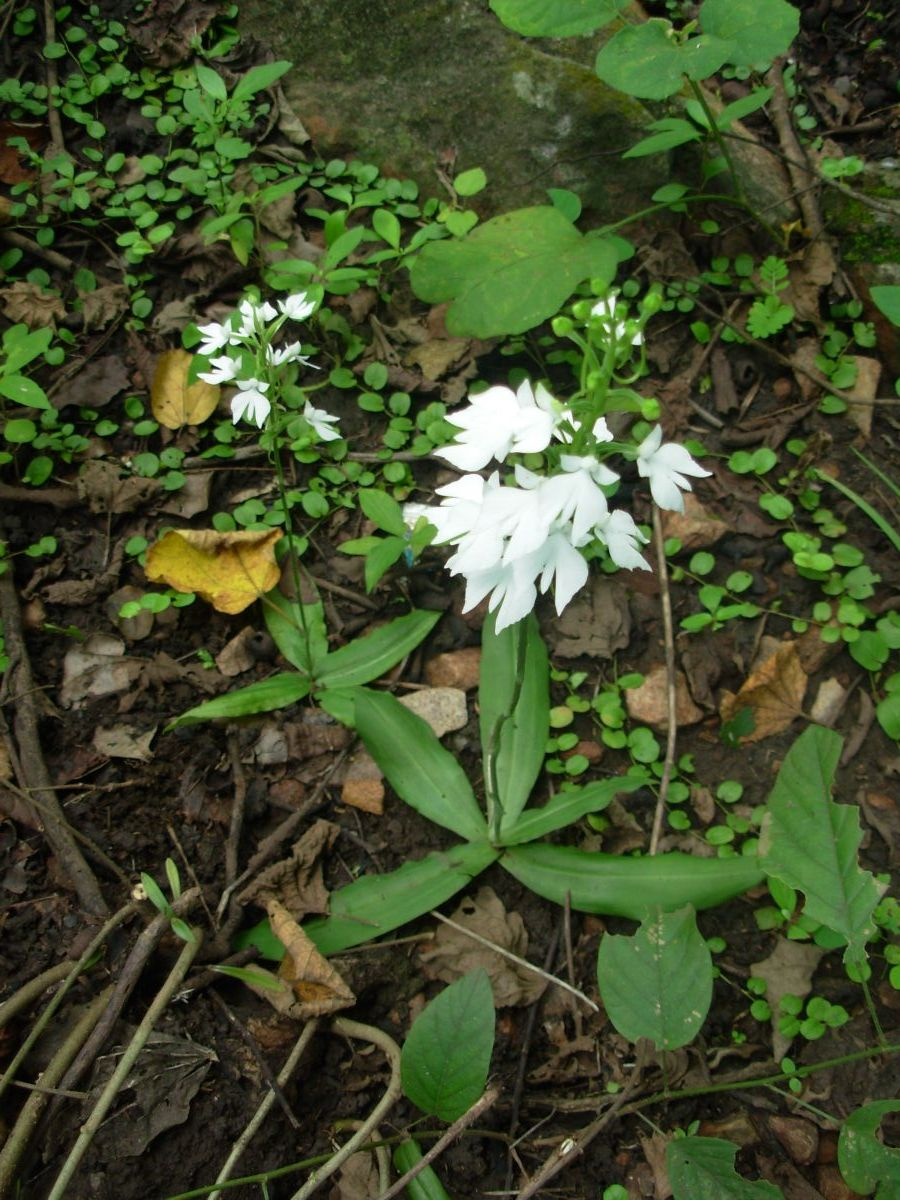

Scientific classification
- Kingdom: Plantae
- Clade: Tracheophytes
- Clade: Angiosperms
- Clade: Monocots
- Order: Asparagales
- Family: Orchidaceae
- Subfamily: Orchidoideae
- Genus: Habenaria
- Species: H. plantaginea

Binomial name
- Habenaria plantaginea Lindl.

= Habenaria plantaginea =

Species of orchid

Habenaria plantaginea is a species of orchid native to Asia.

The specific epithet plantaginea may have originated from the plant's resemblance to the genus Plantago.

== Distribution ==
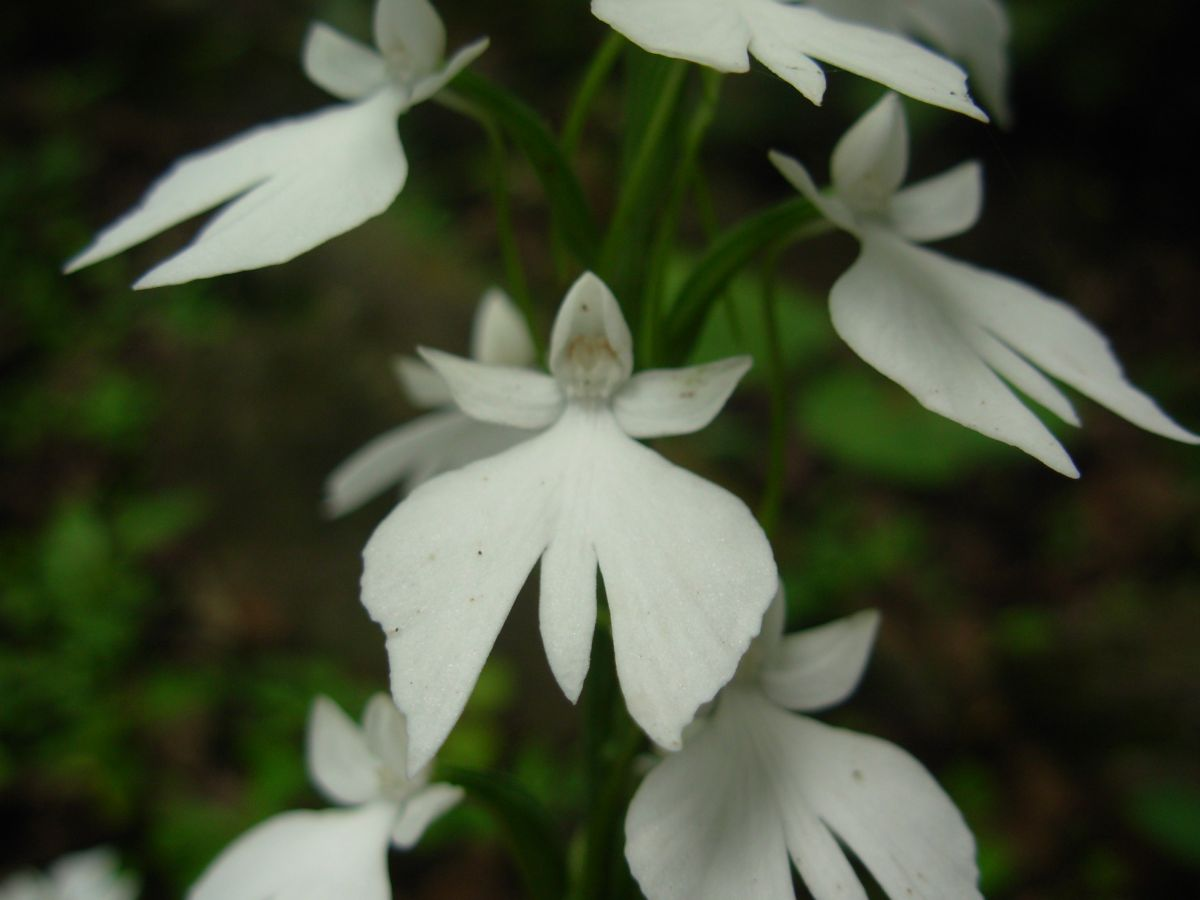
Habenaria plantaginea

This orchid species is native to tropical and sub-tropical habitats, in India, Nepal, Sri Lanka, Bangladesh, and Southeast Asia. The plant prefers shady places in wild. In India it grows in moist and dry deciduous forests. It prefers bushes on rock cervices.

== Description ==
The plant attains a height of about 20–40 centimetres (7.9–15.7 in). Its flowers are white.

Flowers glabrous white with narrowly lanceolate bracts. Dorsal sepals are erect, obtuse at the tip and prominently 3-nerved. Lateral sepals thick, 4 nerved, lateral petals are narrower than the sepals one nerved, more or less hyaline. Lip trilobed, long-spurred with porrect sidelobes. Ovary is shortly stalked. Tubers is oblong, hairy bear 1 or 2 per plant.

== Uses ==
In the Indian subcontinent, the tubers of Habenaria plantaginea are used to treat a variety of ailments, including cough, tuberculosis, asthma, helminthiasis, and snake bites. Extracts of the roots and leaves of Habenaria plantaginea have been investigated as candidates against nociception, inflammation, and fever and as an ecologically friendly source of nanocrystals.
