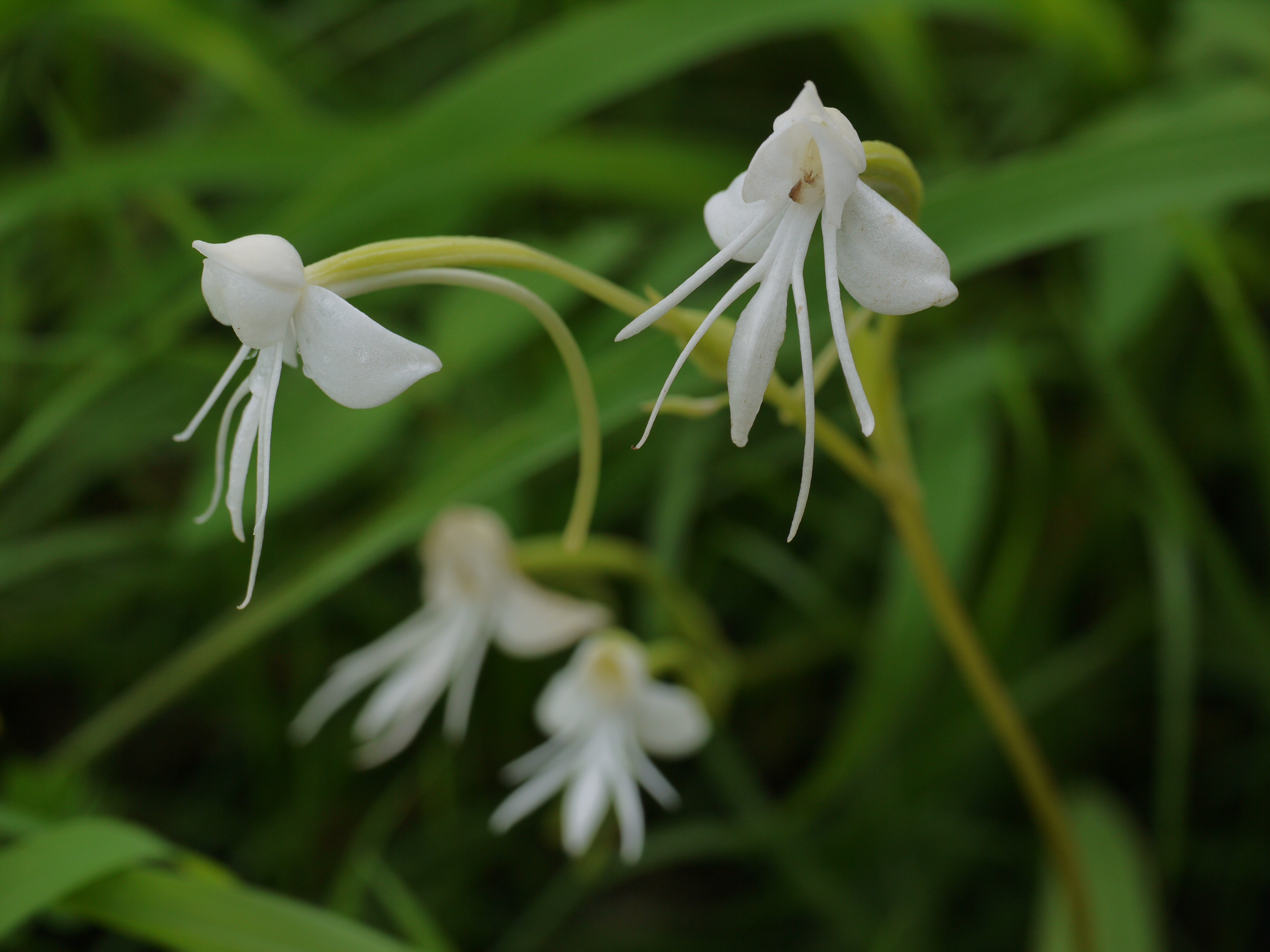

Scientific classification
- Kingdom: Plantae
- Clade: Tracheophytes
- Clade: Angiosperms
- Clade: Monocots
- Order: Asparagales
- Family: Orchidaceae
- Subfamily: Orchidoideae
- Genus: Habenaria
- Species: H. rariflora

Binomial name
- Habenaria rariflora A.Rich.

Synonyms
- Habenaria uniflora Dalzell

= Habenaria rariflora =

Species of orchid

Habenaria rariflora is a species of orchid that grows in dry tropical biome of South West India.
