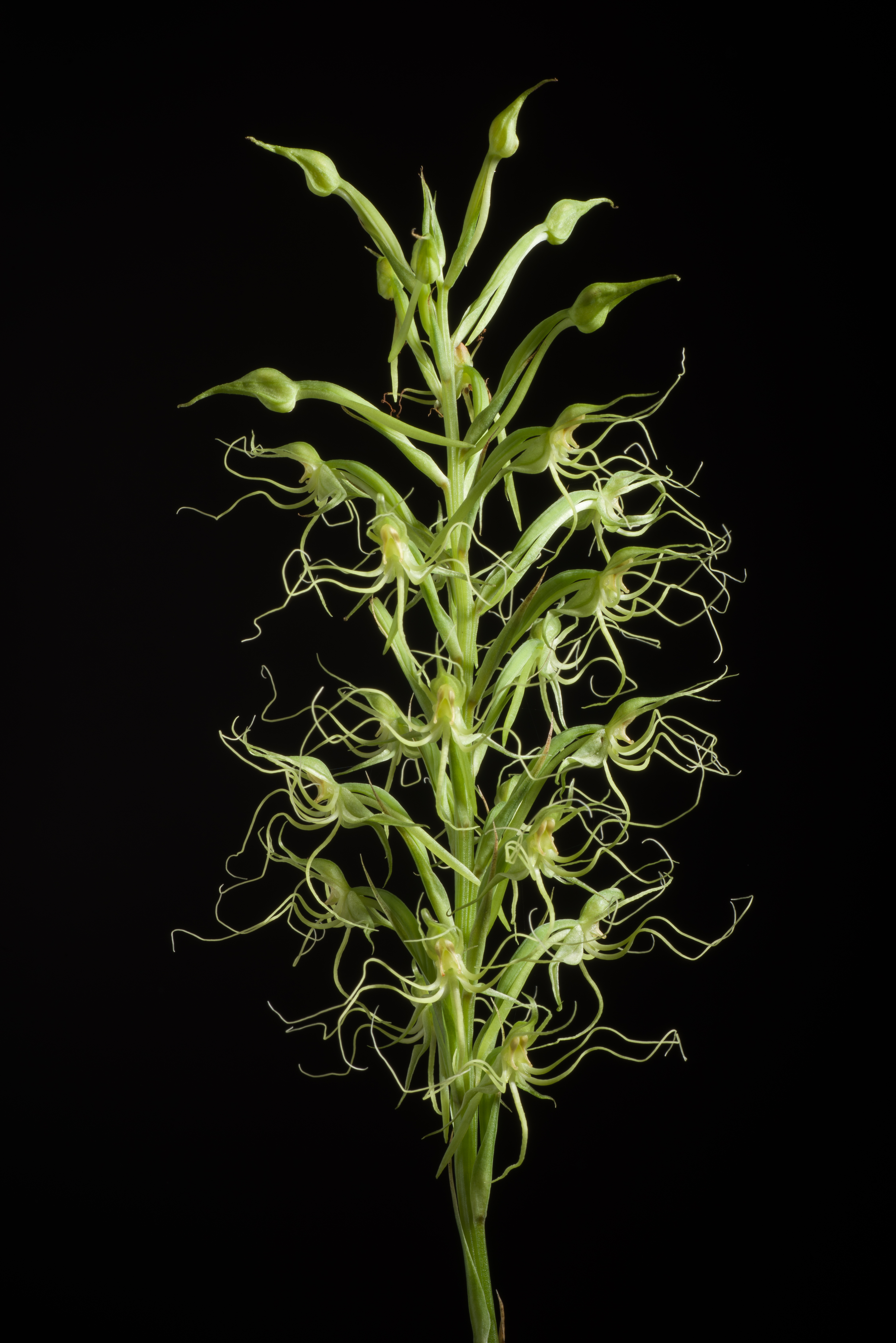
- Habenaria pantlingiana

Scientific classification
- Kingdom: Plantae
- Clade: Tracheophytes
- Clade: Angiosperms
- Clade: Monocots
- Order: Asparagales
- Family: Orchidaceae
- Subfamily: Orchidoideae
- Genus: Habenaria
- Species: H. pantlingiana

Binomial name
- Habenaria pantlingiana Kraenzl.

Synonyms
- List: Habenaria cirrhifera (Ohwi); Habenaria longitentaculata (Hayata); Habenaria polytrichia (Hook.f.); Habenaria polytrichoides (Aver.); Habenaria seshagiriana (A.N.Rao); Habenaria stenopetala var. polytricha (Hook.f.)

= Habenaria pantlingiana =

Species of orchid

Habenaria pantlingiana is a species of orchid that is nativeto Central Himalaya to China (SW. Guangxi, Guangdong) and NE. India, SE. Hainan, Nansei-shotō to N. & Central Taiwan.

== Description ==
The species is a terrestrial herb reaching up to about 70 cm in height. Tubers are fleshy and oblong, measuring approximately 2–4 × 1–2.5 cm. The stem is erect, green, cylindrical, and stout, bearing 6–8 leaves arranged spirally around the middle portion, with 2–5 bract-like leaves present above.

Leaves have an oblong-lanceolate to obovate-lanceolate lamina, 10–15 × 3–4.5 cm, with an attenuate base narrowing into an amplexicaul sheath. The leaf margins are undulate, and the apex is acute or acuminate, often slightly curved.

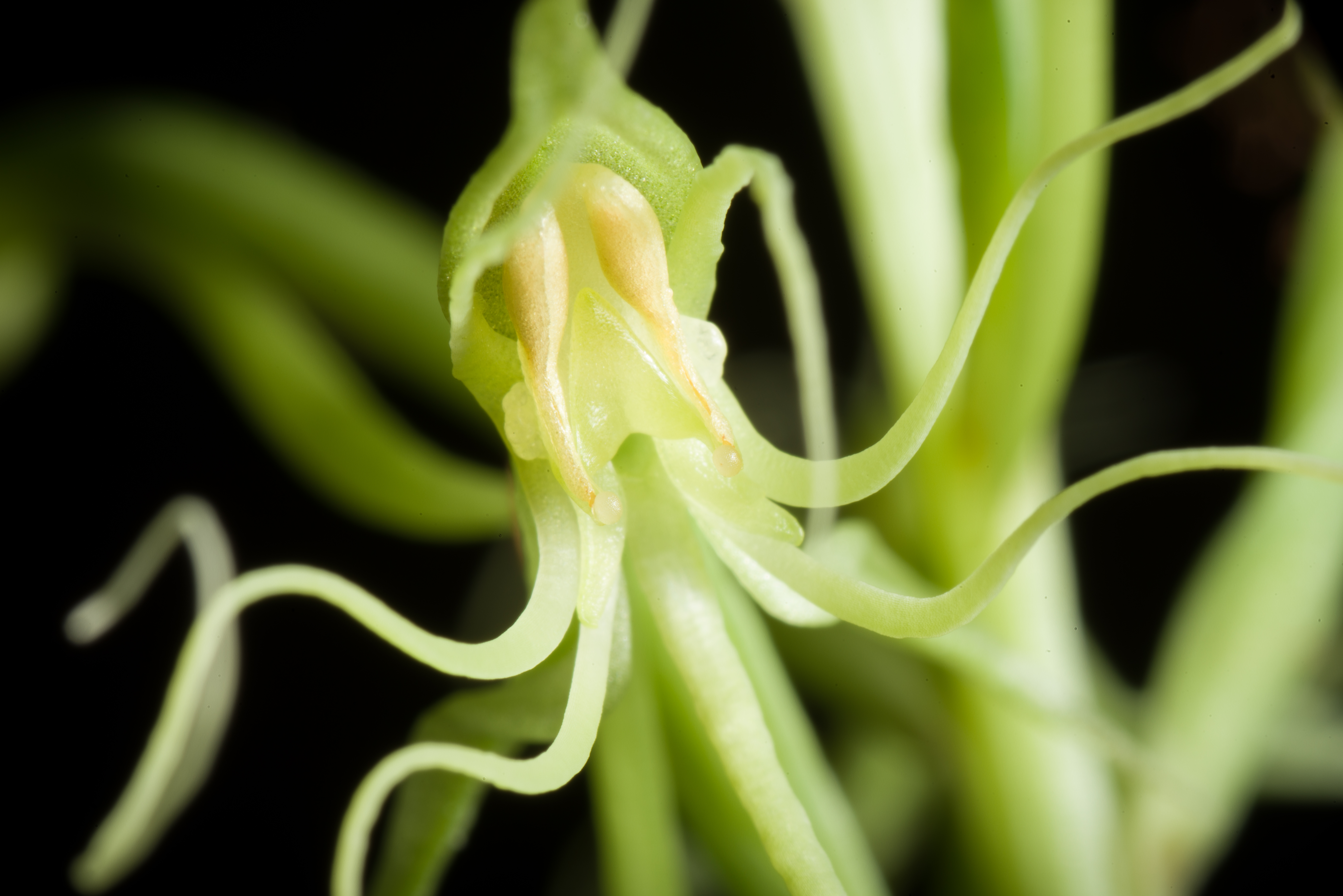

The inflorescence is a densely many-flowered raceme, 4–12.5 cm long. Floral bracts are persistent, lanceolate, 16–24 × 2.5–4.2 mm, and typically as long as or longer than the ovary, with a long-acuminate apex. Flowers are green. The dorsal sepal is prominently erect, lanceolate, concave, and long-acuminate, measuring 2.0–3.0 × 0.4–0.6 cm. Lateral sepals are reflexed, oblique, linear, 1.8–2.5 × 0.3–0.5 cm, and long-acuminate at the tip.

Petals are deeply bilobed from the base and divergent, with filiform lobes; the upper lobe measures 1.1–1.5 × about 0.3 cm, and the lower lobe 1.8–2.0 × about 0.3 cm, both tortuous. The labellum is trilobed from the base, 2.0–2.5 cm × about 0.7 mm, with filiform and tortuous lobes; the mid-lobe is usually shorter than the lateral lobes. The spur is pendulous, cylindrical, and 1.5–2.0 cm long, roughly equal in length to the ovary. The ovary is cylindrical, twisted, 1.7–2.2 cm long, and glabrous. Pollinia are oblong; viscidia are small and orbicular; stigmas are club-shaped.
