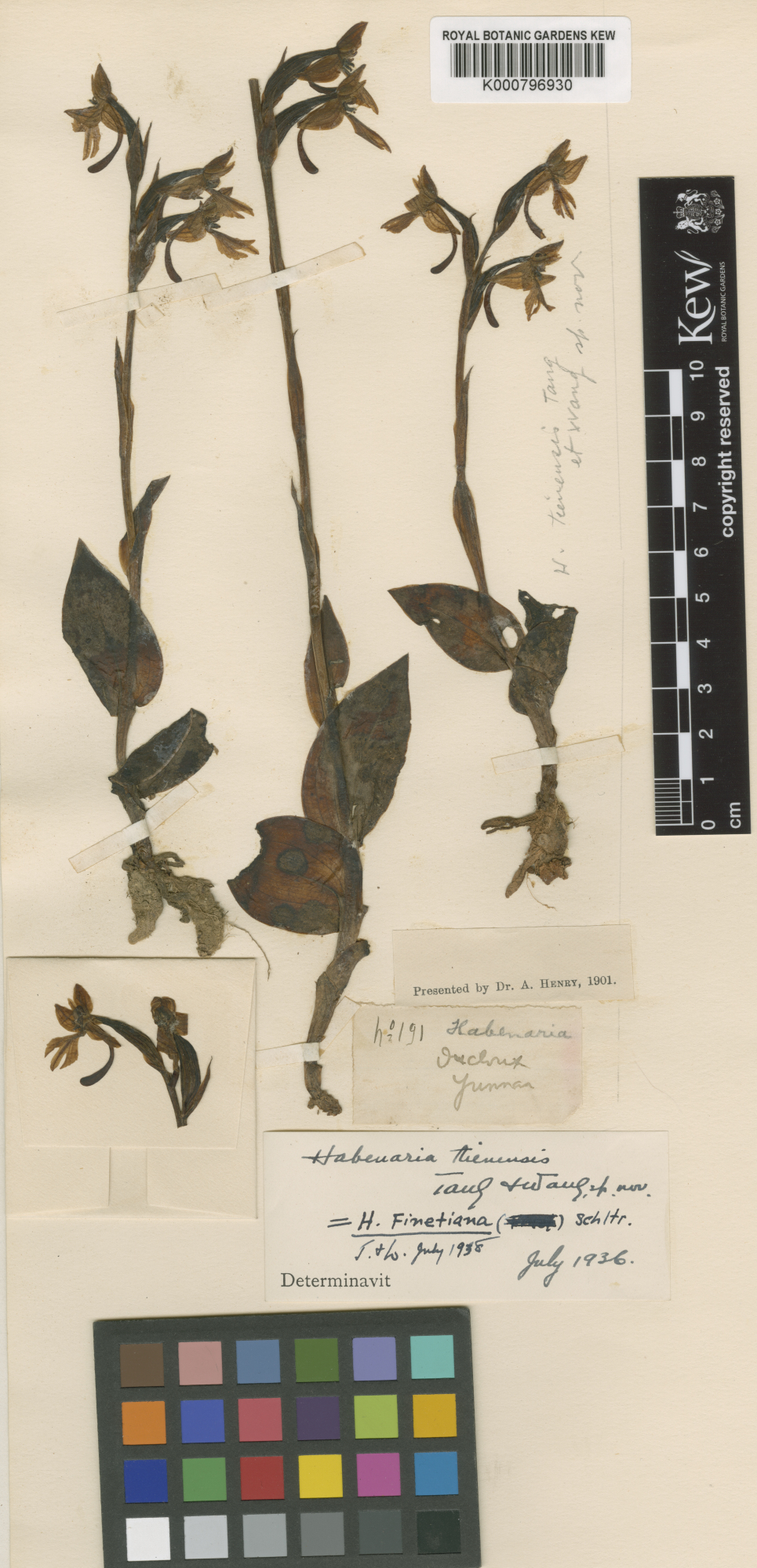

Conservation status
- Vulnerable (IUCN 3.1)

Scientific classification
- Kingdom: Plantae
- Clade: Tracheophytes
- Clade: Angiosperms
- Clade: Monocots
- Order: Asparagales
- Family: Orchidaceae
- Subfamily: Orchidoideae
- Genus: Habenaria
- Species: H. finetiana

Binomial name
- Habenaria finetiana Schltr.

Synonyms
- Habenaria miersiana var. yunnanensis Finet; Habenaria geniculata var. yunnanensis (Finet) Finet; Habenaria peyentsinensis Kraenzl.; Habenaria tienensis Tang & F.T.Wang; Plantaginorchis finetiana (Schltr.) Szlach.; Pecteilis finetiana (Schltr.) M.A.Clem. & D.L.Jones

= Habenaria finetiana =

Species of flowering plant

Habenaria finetiana is a species of plant in the family Orchidaceae. It is endemic to China.
