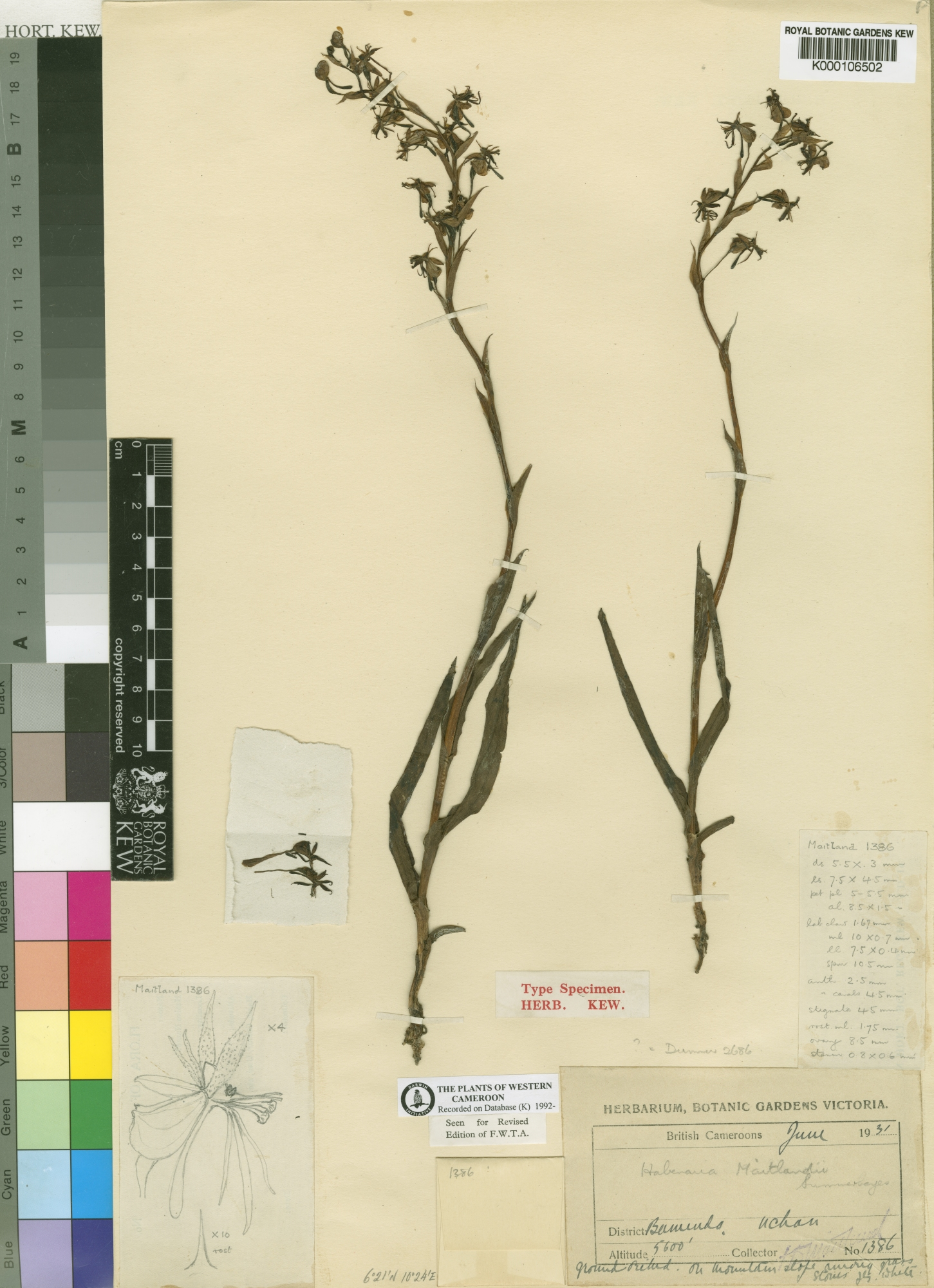

Conservation status
- Endangered (IUCN 3.1)
- CITES Appendix II

Scientific classification
- Kingdom: Plantae
- Clade: Tracheophytes
- Clade: Angiosperms
- Clade: Monocots
- Order: Asparagales
- Family: Orchidaceae
- Subfamily: Orchidoideae
- Genus: Habenaria
- Species: H. maitlandii

Binomial name
- Habenaria maitlandii Summerh.

Synonyms
- Bilabrella maitlandii (Summerh.) Szlach. & Kras-Lap.

= Habenaria maitlandii =

Species of flowering plant

Habenaria maitlandii is a species of plant in the family Orchidaceae. It is native to Cameroon, Gabon, and Nigeria. Its natural habitat is subtropical or tropical dry lowland grassland. It is threatened by habitat loss.
