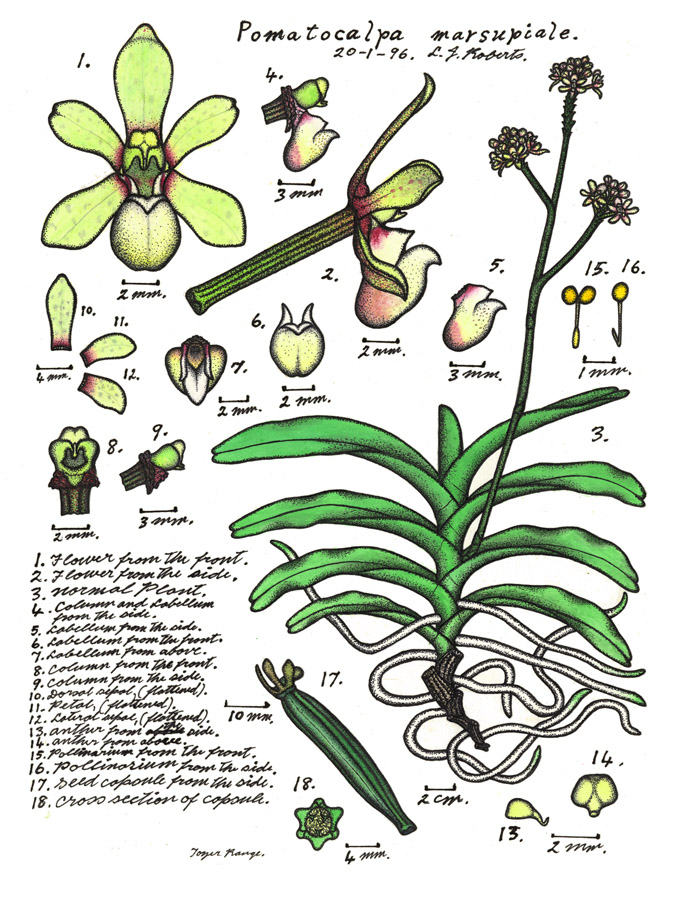
- Illustration by Lewis Roberts

Scientific classification
- Kingdom: Plantae
- Clade: Tracheophytes
- Clade: Angiosperms
- Clade: Monocots
- Order: Asparagales
- Family: Orchidaceae
- Subfamily: Epidendroideae
- Genus: Pomatocalpa
- Species: P. marsupiale

Binomial name
- Pomatocalpa marsupiale (Kraenzl.) J.J.Sm.

Synonyms
- Cleisostoma marsupiale Kraenzl.; Pomatocalpa orientale J.J.Sm.; Pomatocalpa sphaeroceras (Schltr.) J.J.Sm.; Saccolabium sphaeroceras Schltr.

= Pomatocalpa marsupiale =

Branched bladder orchid

Species of orchid

Pomatocalpa marsupiale, commonly known as branched bladder orchid, is an epiphytic or lithophytic orchid that forms large clumps. It has many thick roots, branched stems, many strap-like, leathery leaves and up to many upward-facing green flowers with a cream-coloured or yellowish labellum. It usually grows on high on rainforest trees and is found between Sulawesi and tropical North Queensland, Australia.

== Description ==
Pomatocalpa marsupiale is an epiphytic or lithophytic herb forming large clumps with a branched main stem, 200–500 millimetres (7.9–20 in) long and thick roots. There are many leathery, channelled yellowish green leaves, 150–300 mm (5.9–12 in) long and 40–50 mm (1.6–2.0 in) wide with their bases obscuring the stem.

Between fifteen and twenty green flowers, 12–15 mm (0.47–0.59 in) long and wide are borne on each branch of a flowering stem 200–450 mm (7.9–18 in) long. The sepals and petals spread widely apart from each other. The sepals are 6–8 mm (0.24–0.31 in) long, about 3 mm (0.12 in) wide and the petals are 5–6 mm (0.20–0.24 in) long and about 2 mm (0.079 in) wide. The labellum is cream-coloured or yellowish, 4–5 mm (0.16–0.20 in) long, 3–4 mm (0.12–0.16 in) wide with three lobes. The side lobes curve forwards and the middle lobe is short, thick and fleshy with a pear-shaped spur about 4 mm (0.16 in) long. Flowering occurs from November to May.

Branched bladder orchid is differentiated from the other Australian Pomatocalpa species, P. macphersonii (blotched bladder orchid), by its taller, upright stems, larger leaves, crowded flowers, flower color, and bloom time.

== Taxonomy and naming ==
Branched bladder orchid was first formally described in 1889 by Friedrich Kraenzlin as Cleisostoma marsupiale. He published the description in Die Flora von Kaiser Wilhelms Land. In 1912 Johannes Jacobus Smith changed the name to Pomatocalpa marsupiale. The specific epithet (marsupiale) is derived from the Latin word marsupium meaning "pouch", "bag" or "purse".

== Distribution and habitat ==
Plectorrhiza marsupiale usually grows on tall trees open situations in rainforest. It is found in Malesia, the Solomon Islands, New Guinea and in Queensland on the Iron and McIlwraith Ranges at altitudes between 400 and 600 m (1,300 and 2,000 ft).
