= Orange-tailed shadeskink =

There are two species of skink named orange-tailed shadeskink, both native to Australia:

- Saproscincus challengeri
- Saproscincus rosei
