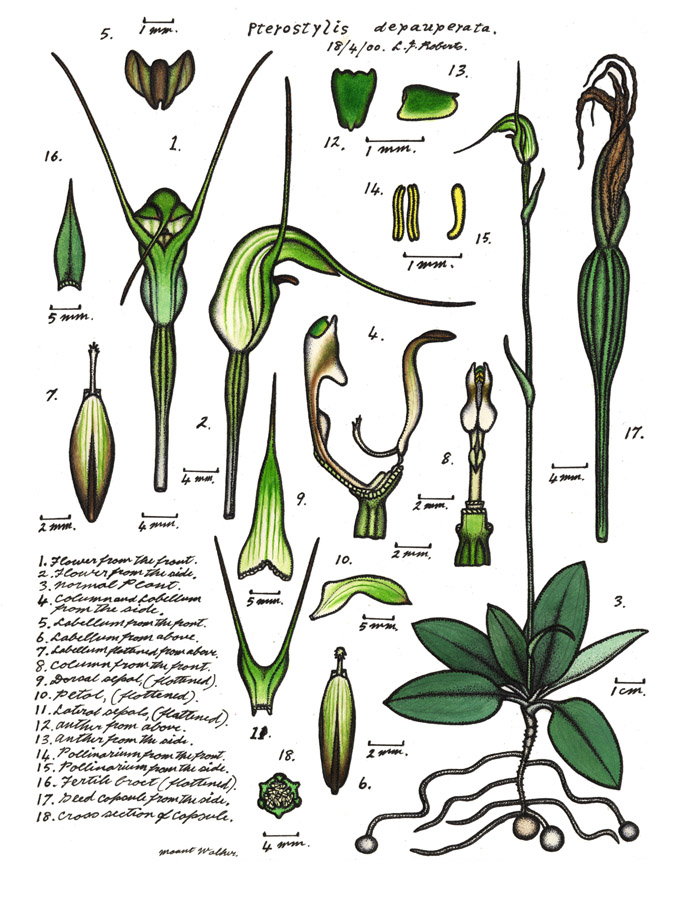
- Drawing of Pterostylis depauperata by Lewis Roberts

Scientific classification
- Kingdom: Plantae
- Clade: Tracheophytes
- Clade: Angiosperms
- Clade: Monocots
- Order: Asparagales
- Family: Orchidaceae
- Subfamily: Orchidoideae
- Tribe: Cranichideae
- Genus: Pterostylis
- Species: P. depauperata

Binomial name
- Pterostylis depauperata F.M.Bailey

Synonyms
- Crangonorchis depauperata (F.M.Bailey) D.L.Jones & M.A.Clem.; Diplodium depauperatum (F.M.Bailey) M.A.Clem. & D.L.Jones

= Pterostylis depauperata =

Keeled greenhood

Species of orchid

Pterostylis depauperata, commonly known as the keeled greenhood, is a species of orchid endemic to Queensland. Flowering plants have a rosette of leaves at the base of a flowering stem with a single small white flower with pale green marks, and a few small stem leaves. Non-flowering plants only have a rosette of leaves. All three sepals on the flower have relatively long, thread-like tips.

== Description ==
Pterostylis depauperata is a terrestrial, perennial, deciduous, herb with an underground tuber and which often grows in colonies. Non-flowering plants have a rosette of between three and seven egg-shaped, greyish green leaves lying flat on the ground. Each leaf is 10–40 mm (0.4–2 in) long and 5–10 mm (0.2–0.4 in) wide. Flowering plants have a single flower 15–17 mm (0.6–0.7 in) long and 8–10 mm (0.3–0.4 in) wide on a flowering stem 80–200 mm (3–8 in) high with a few small stem leaves. The flowers are white with pale green striations. The dorsal sepal and petals are fused, forming a hood or "galea" over the column. The dorsal sepal has a thread-like tip 10–13 mm (0.4–0.5 in) long and lateral sepals are erect, held closely against the galea and have thread-like tips 17–20 mm (0.7–0.8 in) long. The labellum is 8–10 mm (0.3–0.4 in) long, about 3 mm (0.1 in) wide, dark brown and curved, and just protrudes above the sinus. Flowering occurs from March to August.

== Taxonomy and naming ==
Pterostylis depauperata was first formally described in 1943 by Frederick Bailey from a specimen collected near Cairns. The description was published in the Botany Bulletin of the Queensland Department of Agriculture.

== Distribution and habitat ==
The keeled greenhood grows with grasses and small shrubs in woodland and forest between Cooktown and Ravenshoe at altitudes above 500 m (1,600 ft).
