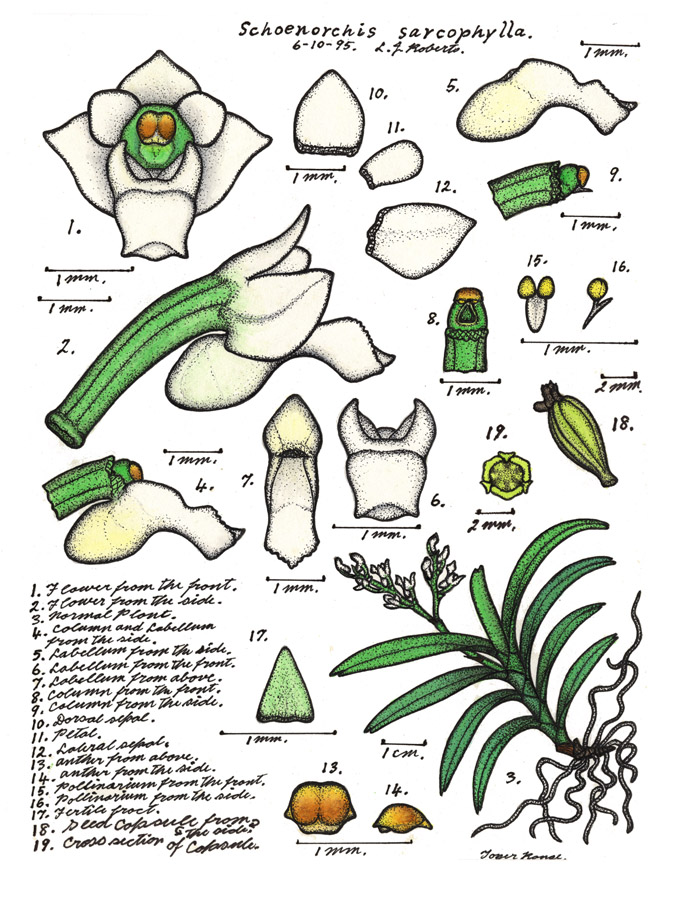
- Illustration by Lewis Roberts

Scientific classification
- Kingdom: Plantae
- Clade: Tracheophytes
- Clade: Angiosperms
- Clade: Monocots
- Order: Asparagales
- Family: Orchidaceae
- Subfamily: Epidendroideae
- Genus: Schoenorchis
- Species: S. sarcophylla

Binomial name
- Schoenorchis sarcophylla Schltr.

= Schoenorchis sarcophylla =

Fleshy flea orchid

Species of orchid

Schoenorchis sarcophylla, commonly known as the fleshy flea orchid, is a small epiphytic orchid with many thin roots, between three and seven crowded, dark green leaves and up to thirty crowded, tube-shaped white flowers. It is found in New Guinea and tropical North Queensland.

== Description ==
Schoenorchis sarcophylla is a small epiphytic herb with many thin roots, stems 30–50 mm (1–2 in) long and between three and seven crowded, fleshy, channelled dark green, linear to narrow elliptic leaves 20–30 mm (0.79–1.2 in) long and 4–5 mm (0.2–0.2 in) wide. Between five and thirty crowded, tube-shaped white flowers, about 3 mm (0.12 in) long and wide are crowded on a stiff flowering stem 20–40 mm (0.8–2 in) long. The sepals are 1–1.5 mm (0.039–0.059 in) long and 1 mm (0.039 in) wide. The petals are smaller than, and hidden by the sepals. The labellum is about 3 mm (0.1 in) long and 1 mm (0.04 in) wide with three small lobes, the middle lobe short and fleshy with an inflated spur. Flowering occurs between August and September.

== Taxonomy and naming ==
Schoenorchis sarcophylla was first formally described in 1913 by Rudolf Schlechter and the description was published in Repertorium specierum novarum regni vegetabilis. Beihefte. The specific epithet (sarcophylla) is derived from the ancient Greek words sarx, genitive sarkos (σάρξ, genitive σαρκός) meaning "flesh" and phyllon (φύλλον) meaning "leaf".

== Distribution and habitat ==
The fleshy flea orchid grows on trees in forest at altitudes between 600 and 1,800 m (2,000 and 5,900 ft). It is found in New Guinea and in the Iron and McIlwraith Ranges in Queensland.
