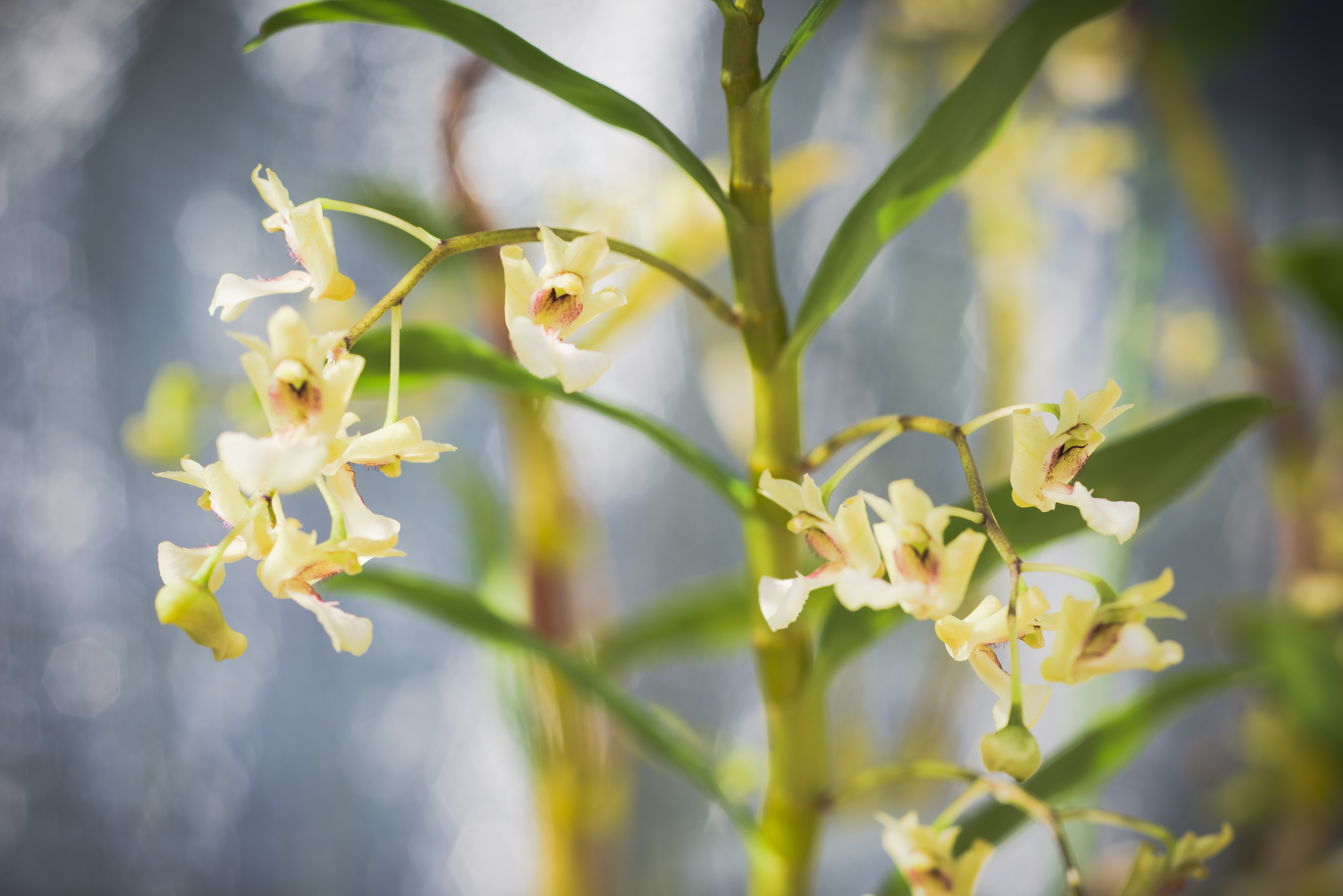
- Dendrobium angustipetalum

Scientific classification
- Kingdom: Plantae
- Clade: Tracheophytes
- Clade: Angiosperms
- Clade: Monocots
- Order: Asparagales
- Family: Orchidaceae
- Subfamily: Epidendroideae
- Genus: Dendrobium
- Section: Dendrobium sect. Brevisaccata; Kraenzl. 1910

Type species
- Dendrobium agrostophyllum

Species
- See text

Synonyms
- Dendrobium sect. Trachyrhizum Schlechter 1912; Trachyrhizum (Schlechter) Brieger 1981

= Dendrobium sect. Brevisaccata =

Section of flowering plants

Dendrobium section Brevisaccata is a section of the genus Dendrobium.

== Description ==
Plants in this section have long slender pseudobulbs with multi-flowered inflorescence with small flowers.

== Distribution ==
Plants from this section are found in Papua and New Guinea to Australia.

== Species ==
Dendrobium section Brevisaccata comprises the following species:

Image	Name	Distribution	Elevation (m)
	Dendrobium agrostophyllum F. Mueller 1872	Australia (northeastern Queensland)	800–1,300 metres (2,600–4,300 ft)
	Dendrobium angustipetalum J.J.Sm. 1905	Moluccas and New Guinea	1,000–1,100 metres (3,300–3,600 ft)
	Dendrobium chalmersii F.Muell. 1882	northeastern New Guinea (Milne Bay)	0–1,000 metres (0–3,281 ft)
	Dendrobium cyrtolobum Schltr.1912	New Guinea (Morobe)	800 metres (2,600 ft)
	Dendrobium dissitifolium Ridl. 1916	New Guinea, Papua (Timika Mimika Regency)	1,700 metres (5,600 ft)
	Dendrobium latelabellatum Gilli 1983	New Guinea (Enga)	
	Dendrobium prostheciglossum Schltr. 1912	Papua (Manokwari, Paniai, Jaya Wijaya, and Jayapura Regencies) and New Guinea(East Sepik, Southern Highlands, Enga, Western Highlands, Madang, Morobe, and New Britain), and Vanuatu	1,100–2,600 metres (3,600–8,500 ft)
	Dendrobium taeniocaule Schuit., Juswara & Droissart 2016	New Guinea, Andaman Islands	1,114 metres (3,655 ft)
	Dendrobium viridiflorum F.M.Bailey 1898	Moluccas, New Guinea (Morobe), Papua (Biak Numfor, Yapen-Waropen, and Jayapura Regencies; Waigeo Island)and the Solomon Islands	0–200 metres (0–656 ft)
