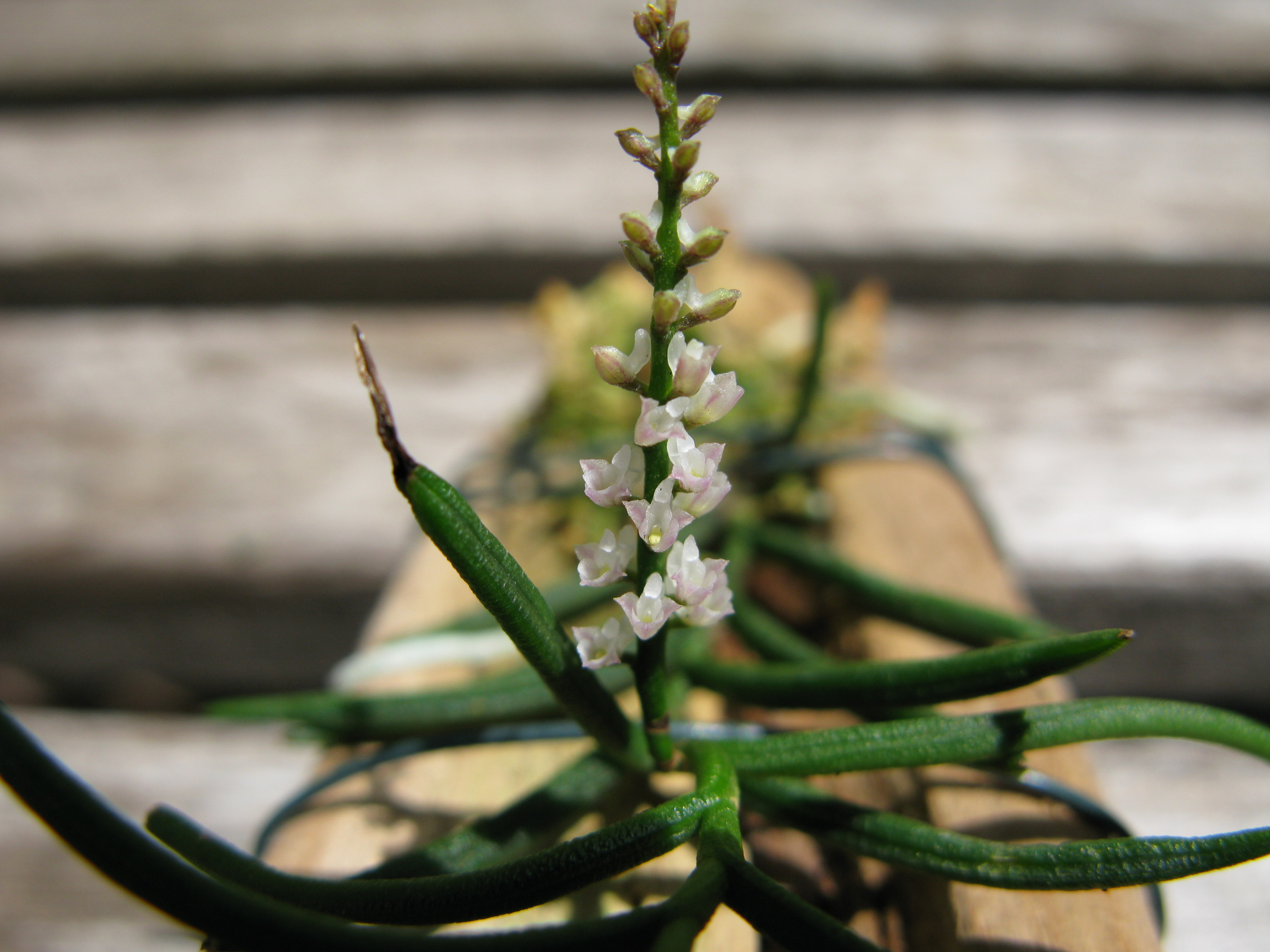

Scientific classification
- Kingdom: Plantae
- Clade: Tracheophytes
- Clade: Angiosperms
- Clade: Monocots
- Order: Asparagales
- Family: Orchidaceae
- Subfamily: Epidendroideae
- Genus: Schoenorchis
- Species: S. micrantha

Binomial name
- Schoenorchis micrantha Reinw. ex Blume

Synonyms
- Ascocentrum micranthum (Reinw. ex Blume) Holttum; Saccolabium chionanthum Lindl.; Saccolabium perpusillum Hook.f.; Gastrochilus chionanthus (Lindl.) Kuntze; Gastrochilus perpusillus (Hook.f.) Kuntze; Saccolabium plebeium J.J.Sm.; Schoenorchis densiflora Schltr.; Schoenorchis densiflora var. abbreviata Schltr.; Schoenorchis plebeia (J.J.Sm.) J.J.Sm.

= Schoenorchis micrantha =

Tangled flea orchid

Species of orchid

Schoenorchis micrantha, commonly known as the tangled flea orchid, is a small epiphytic orchid that forms small, tangled clumps and has thin stems, many linear leaves and up to thirty small, white, bell-shaped flowers. It is found from Indochina to the south-west Pacific.

== Description ==
Schoenorchis micrantha is a small epiphytic herb that forms small, tangled clumps. It has thin, curved, twisted, branched stems 30–150 mm (1–6 in) long and many thick, curved fleshy, linear leaves 30–60 mm (1.2–2.4 in) long and 2.5 mm (0.1 in) wide. Between five and thirty densely crowded, tube-shaped to bell-shaped white flowers, about 2 mm (0.079 in) long and 1.5 mm (0.059 in) wide are arranged on a flowering stem 10–30 mm (0.4–1 in) long. The sepals are about 2 mm (0.079 in) long and 1 mm (0.039 in) wide whilst the petals are about 2 mm (0.079 in) long and 1.5 mm (0.059 in) wide. The labellum is about 2.5 mm (0.1 in) long with three lobes. The side lobes are short and erect and the middle lobe is short with a short spur. Flowering occurs between April and July.

== Taxonomy and naming ==
Schoenorchis micrantha was first formally described in 1825 by Carl Ludwig Blume from an unpublished description by Caspar Reinwardt and the description was published in Bijdragen tot de flora van Nederlandsch Indië. The specific epithet (micrantha) is derived from the Ancient Greek words mikros meaning "small" or "little" and anthos meaning "flower".

== Distribution and habitat ==
The tangled flea orchid grows on mangroves and rainforest trees in humid, well lit places. It is found in Thailand, Vietnam, Borneo, Java, the Lesser Sunda Islands, Peninsular Malaysia, the Philippines, Sumatra, New Guinea, the Solomon Islands, Queensland, Fiji, New Caledonia, Samoa and Vanuatu. In Queensland it is found between the Iron Range and the Tully River.
