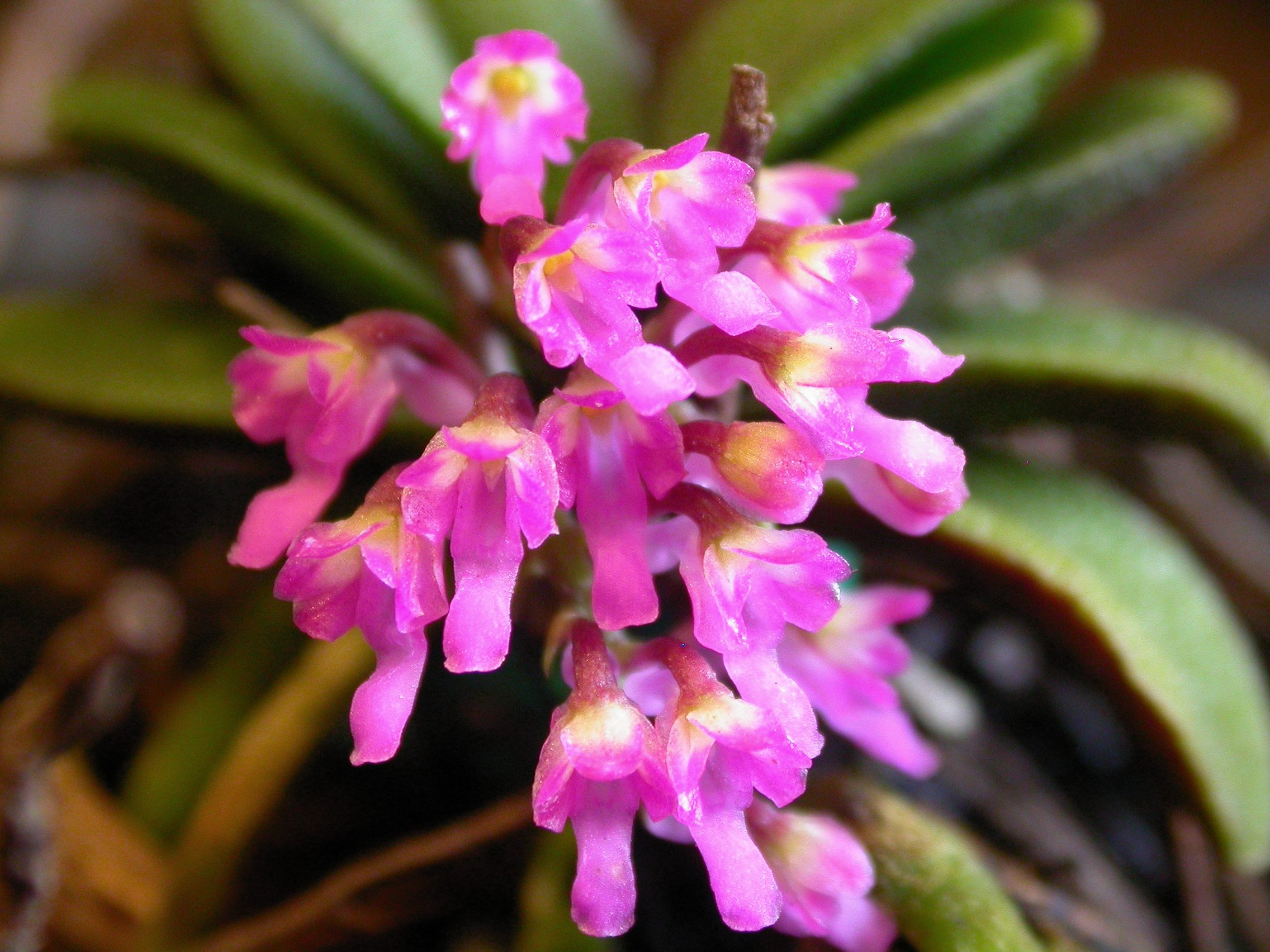
- Schoenorchis fragrans

Scientific classification
- Kingdom: Plantae
- Clade: Tracheophytes
- Clade: Angiosperms
- Clade: Monocots
- Order: Asparagales
- Family: Orchidaceae
- Subfamily: Epidendroideae
- Tribe: Vandeae
- Subtribe: Aeridinae
- Genus: Schoenorchis; Reinw. ex Blume

Type species
- Schoenorchis juncifolia Reinw. ex Blume

Synonyms
- Xenikophyton Garay

= Schoenorchis =

Genus of orchids

Schoenorchis, commonly known as flea orchids, or 匙唇兰属 (chi chun lan shu) in Chinese, is a genus of flowering plants from the orchid family, Orchidaceae. Plants in this genus are small epiphytes with thin roots, thin leafy stems with leaves in two ranks and tiny fragrant, almost tube-shaped flowers with a prominently spurred labellum. There are about twenty five species found from tropical and subtropical Asia to the Western Pacific.

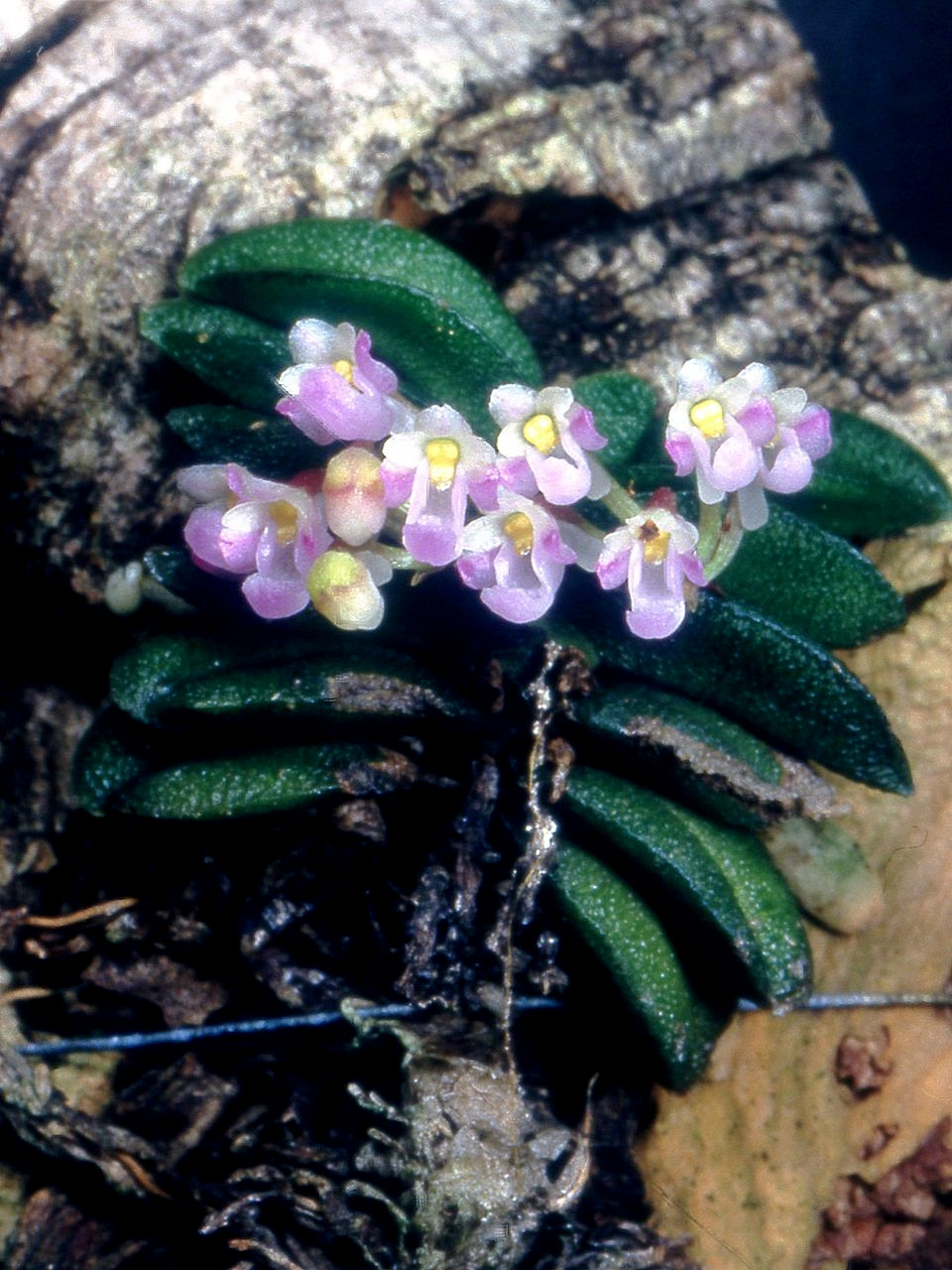
Schoenorchis seidenfadenii

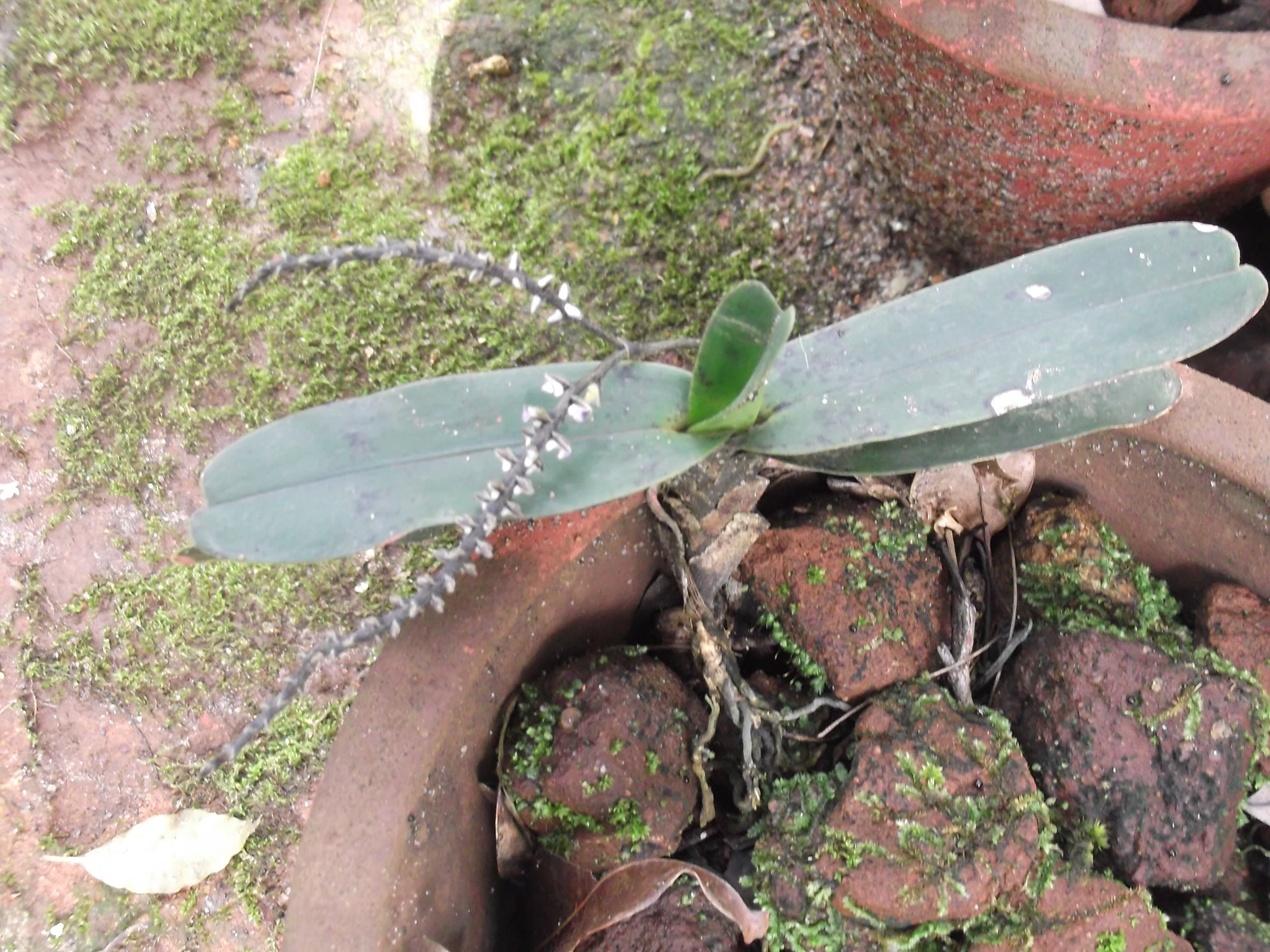
Schoenorchis smeeana (Rchb.f.) Jalal, Jayanthi & Schuit. (as Xenikophyton smeeanum (Rchb.f.) Garay)

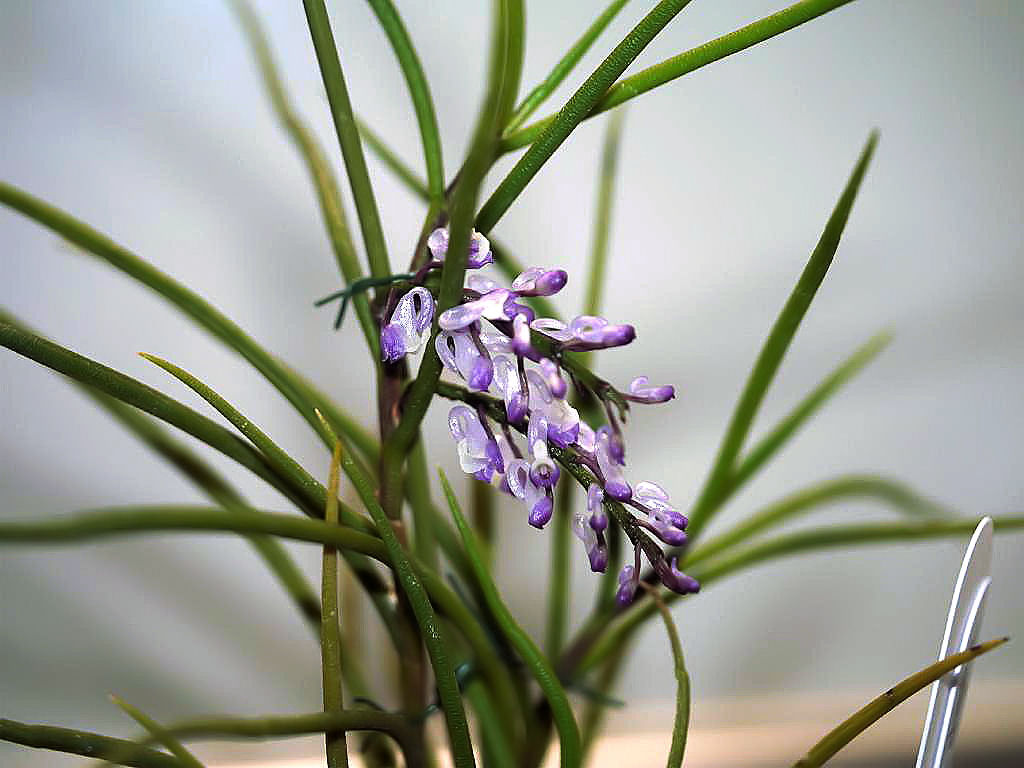
Schoenorchis juncifolia Reinw. ex Blume

== Description ==
Orchids in the genus Schoenorchis are small epiphytic, monopodial herbs with thin roots, sometimes with branching stems and flat to almost cylindrical leaves with their bases sheathing the thin, fibrous stems. The flowers are small, fleshy, fragrant, often white or reddish purple and do not open widely. The sepals and petals overlap at the base so that the flowers often appear tube-shaped. The labellum is rigidly fixed to the column, usually longer than the petals and has three lobes with a spur at its base. The side lobes of the labellum are erect and the middle lobe is often spatula-shaped.

== Etymology ==
The name Schoenorchis is derived from the Ancient Greek words schoinos meaning "sedge", "rush-rope" or "rope" and orchis meaning "testicle" or "orchid". This is thought to refer to the terete leaves of some of the species.

== Taxonomy ==
The genus Schoenorchis was first formally described in 1825 by Carl Ludwig Blume from an unpublished description by Caspar Reinwardt and the description was published in Bijdragen tot de flora van Nederlandsch Indië. The type species is Schoenorchis juncifolia Reinw. ex Blume.

=== Sections ===
The genus was divided into the sections Pumila, Schoenorchis, and Racemosae.

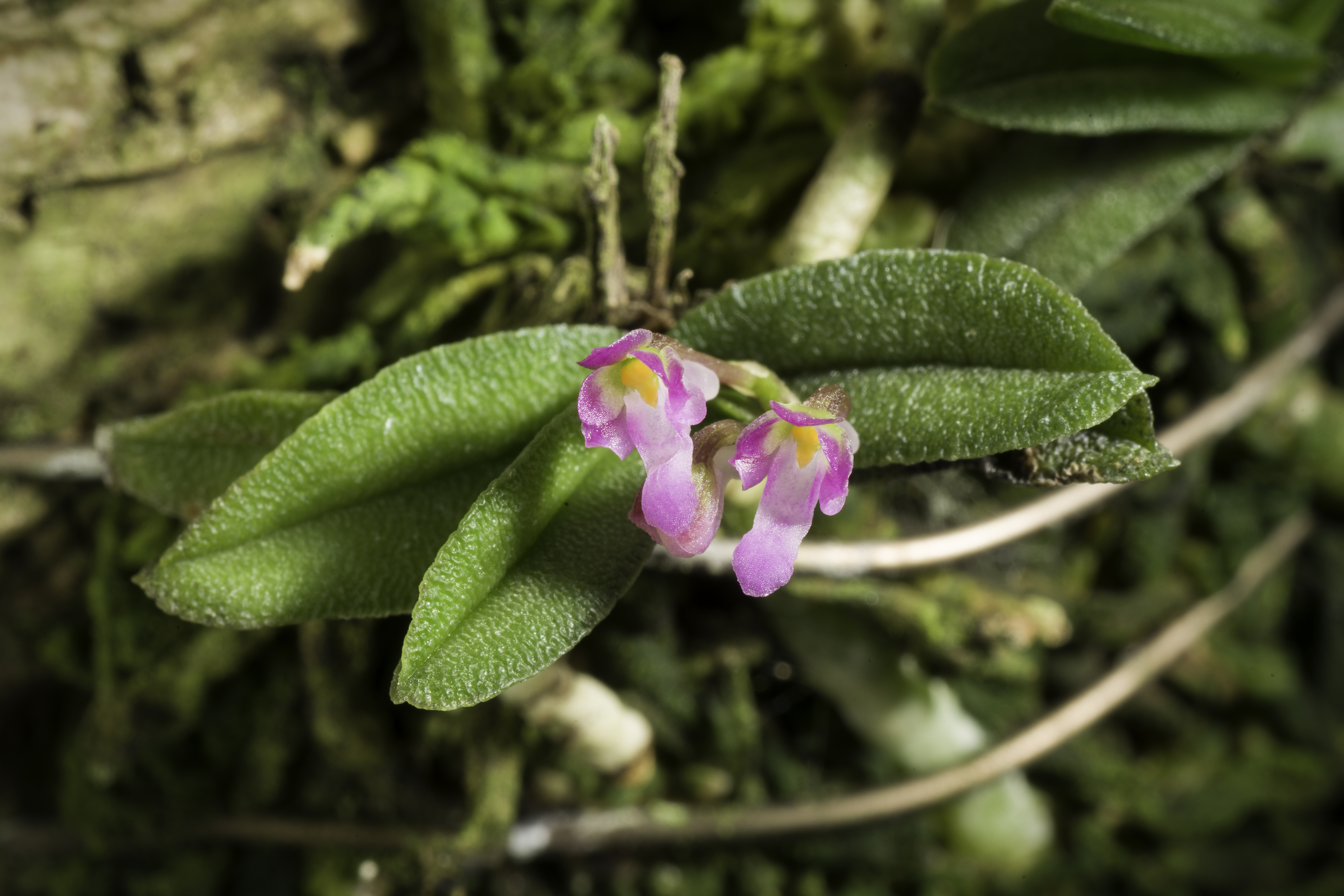
Schoenorchis fragrans (C.S.P.Parish & Rchb.f.) Seidenf. & Smitinand, a member of Schoenorchis sect. Pumila Aver.

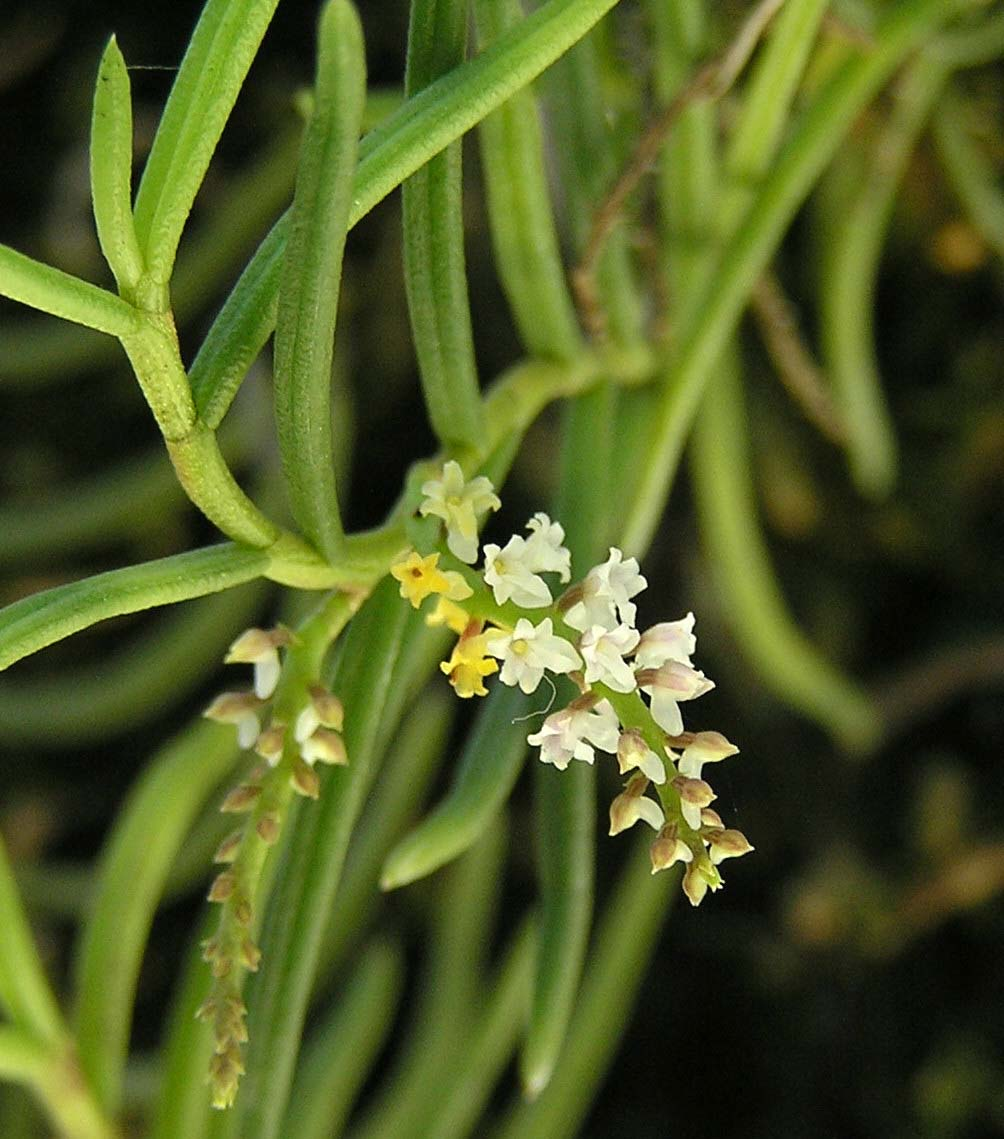
Schoenorchis micrantha Reinw. ex Blume, a member of Schoenorchis sect. Schoenorchis

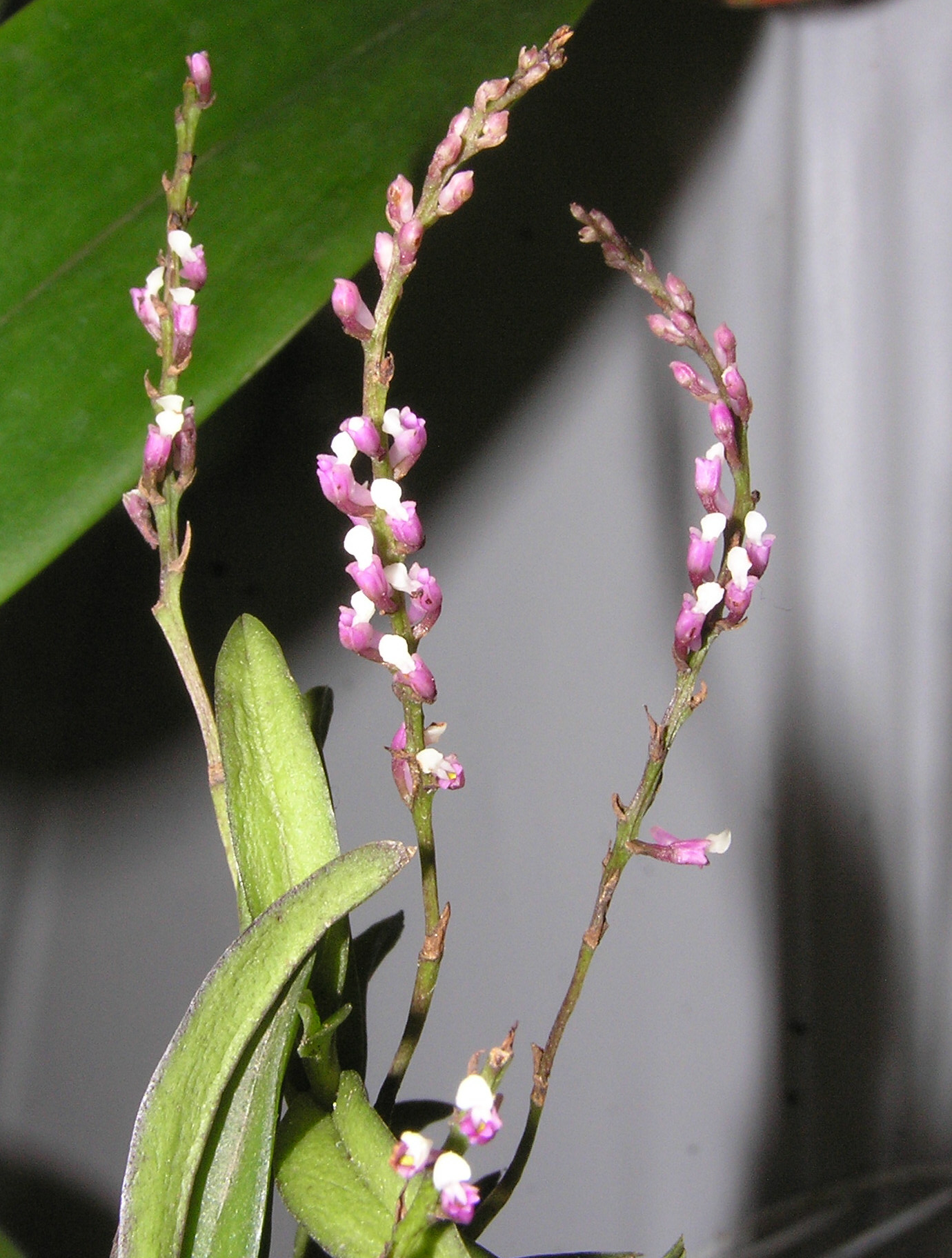
Schoenorchis gemmata (Lindl.) J.J.Sm., a member of Schoenorchis sect. Racemosae Aver.

=== Species list ===
The following is a list of species accepted by the World Checklist of Selected Plant Families as at January 2019:

- Schoenorchis aurea (Ridl.) Garay - Sarawak
- Schoenorchis brevirachis Seidenf. - Vietnam
- Schoenorchis buddleiflora (Schltr. & J.J.Sm.) J.J.Sm. - Sumatra, Borneo
- Schoenorchis endertii (J.J.Sm.) Christenson & J.J.Wood - Borneo
- Schoenorchis fragrans (C.S.P.Parish & Rchb.f.) Seidenf. & Smitinand - Yunnan, Assam, Myanmar, Thailand, Vietnam
- Schoenorchis gemmata (Lindl.) J.J.Sm. - Fujian, Guangxi, Hainan, Hong Kong, Tibet, Yunnan, Bhutan, Cambodia, Assam, Laos, Myanmar, Nepal, Thailand, Vietnam
- Schoenorchis hangianae Aver. & Duy
- Schoenorchis jerdoniana (Wight) Garay - southern India
- Schoenorchis juncifolia Reinw. ex Blume - Borneo, Java, Malaysia, Sumatra
- Schoenorchis manilaliana M.Kumar & Sequiera - Kerala
- Schoenorchis micrantha Reinw. ex Blume - Thailand, Vietnam, Malaysia, Indonesia, Philippines, New Guinea, Queensland, Solomons, Fiji, New Caledonia, Samoa, Vanuatu
- Schoenorchis minutiflora (Ridl.) J.J.Sm. - Andaman Islands, Thailand, Malaysia
- Schoenorchis nivea (Lindl.) Schltr. - Sri Lanka
- Schoenorchis pachyacris (J.J.Sm.) J.J.Sm. - Java, Sumatra
- Schoenorchis pachyglossa (Lindl.) Garay - Borneo
- Schoenorchis paniculata Blume - Java, Sumatra, Borneo, Bali, Flores, Lombok, Timor
- Schoenorchis phitamii Aver. - Vietnam
- Schoenorchis sarcophylla Schltr. - Papua New Guinea, Queensland
- Schoenorchis scolopendria Aver. - Vietnam
- Schoenorchis secundiflora (Ridl.) J.J.Sm. - Borneo, Thailand, Malaysia
- Schoenorchis seidenfadenii Pradhan - Thailand, Vietnam
- Schoenorchis smeeana (Rchb.f.) Jalal, Jayanthi & Schuit.
- Schoenorchis subulata (Schltr.) J.J.Sm. - Sulawesi
- Schoenorchis sumatrana J.J.Sm. - Sumatra
- Schoenorchis tortifolia (Jayaw.) Garay - Sri Lanka
- Schoenorchis vanoverberghii Ames - Taiwan, Philippines

=== Newly described species ===
- Schoenorchis mishmensis K.Gogoi, Mega & Chowlu - India

== Distribution ==
Orchids in this genus occur in China, the Indian subcontinent, Indochina, Malesia, New Guinea, Fiji, New Caledonia, Samoa, Vanuatu and northern Australia.

== Ecology ==
=== Pollination ===
The small, entomophilous, colourful flowers of Schoenorchis gemmata produce nectar and fragrance during the daytime and they are believed to be pollinated by insects of the order Hymenoptera. More specifically, pollination by bees has been reported. Apart from insect pollination, autogamy has been also reported to occur, for instance in Schoenorchis paniculata, and possibly in Schoenorchis sarcophylla.

== Conservation ==
Some species are very rare. Only 20 individuals of Schoenorchis mishmensis K.Gogoi, Mega & Chowlu are known to exist in the wild, and it is therefore thought to be critically endangered.

== See also ==
- List of Orchidaceae genera
