= Saproscincus czechurai =

Conservation status
- Least Concern (IUCN 3.1)

Scientific classification
- Kingdom: Animalia
- Phylum: Chordata
- Class: Reptilia
- Order: Squamata
- Family: Scincidae
- Genus: Saproscincus
- Species: S. czechurai

Binomial name
- Saproscincus czechurai (Ingram & Rawlinson, 1981)
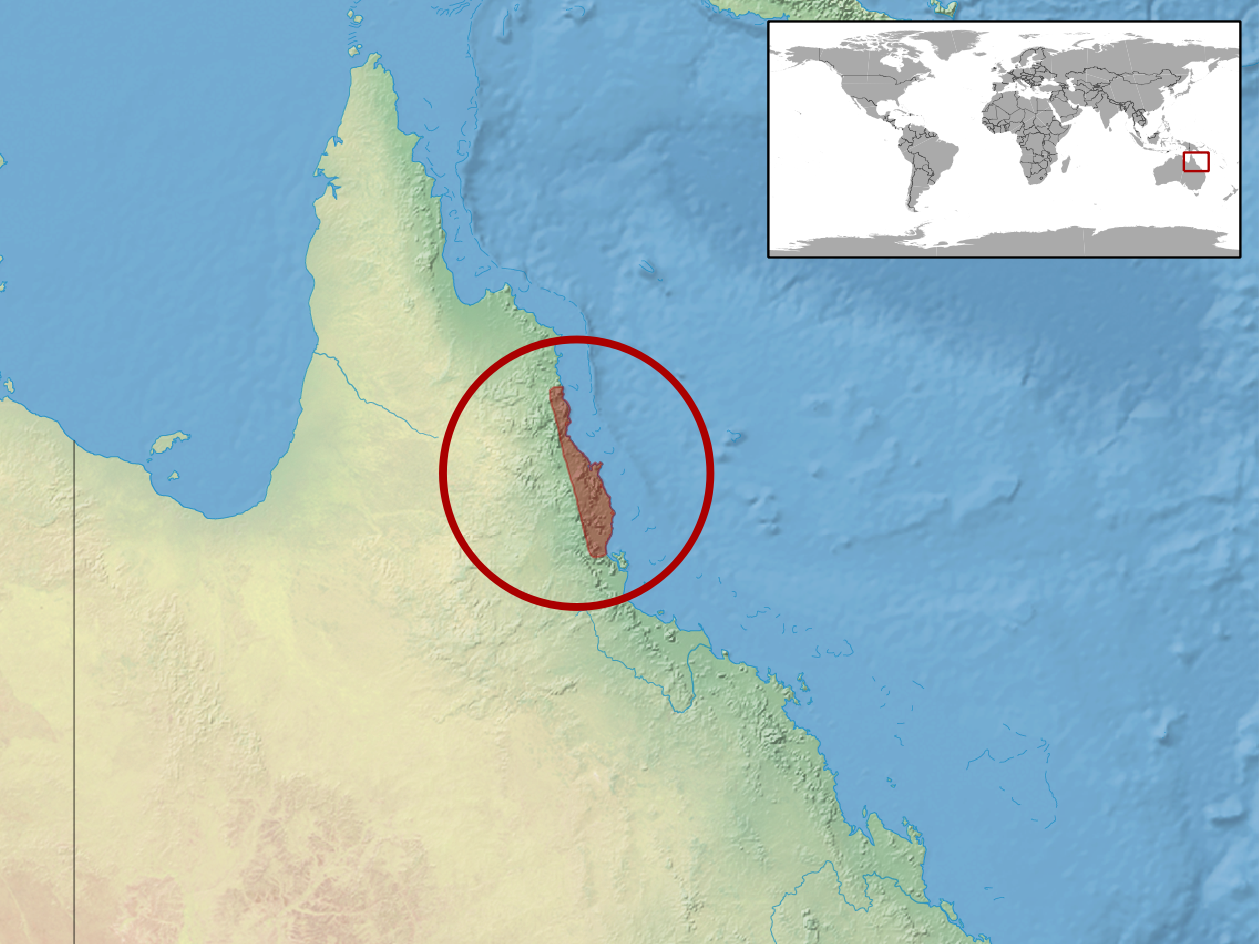

Synonyms
- Lampropholis czechurai Ingram & Rawlinson, 1981; Ctenotus czechurai — Wells & Wellington, 1983; Ctenotus czechurae — Muñoz et al., 2016

Species of lizard

Saproscincus czechurai, also known commonly as Czechura's litter-skink, Czechura's skink, and the wedge-snouted shadeskink, is a species of lizard in the family Scincidae. The species is endemic to Queensland in Australia.

== Etymology ==
The specific name, czechurai, is in honor of Australian herpetologist Gregory Vincent Czechura.

== Habitat ==
The preferred natural habitat of C. czechurai is forest, at altitudes above 900 m (3,000 ft).

== Reproduction ==
S. czechurai is oviparous.
