= Saproscincus eungellensis =

Conservation status
- Data Deficient (IUCN 3.1)

Scientific classification
- Kingdom: Animalia
- Phylum: Chordata
- Class: Reptilia
- Order: Squamata
- Suborder: Scinciformata
- Infraorder: Scincomorpha
- Family: Eugongylidae
- Genus: Saproscincus
- Species: S. eungellensis

Binomial name
- Saproscincus eungellensis Sadlier, Couper, Colgan, Vanderduys, & Rickard, 2005

Species of lizard

Saproscincus eungellensis, the Eungella shadeskink, is a species of skink found in Queensland in Australia.
