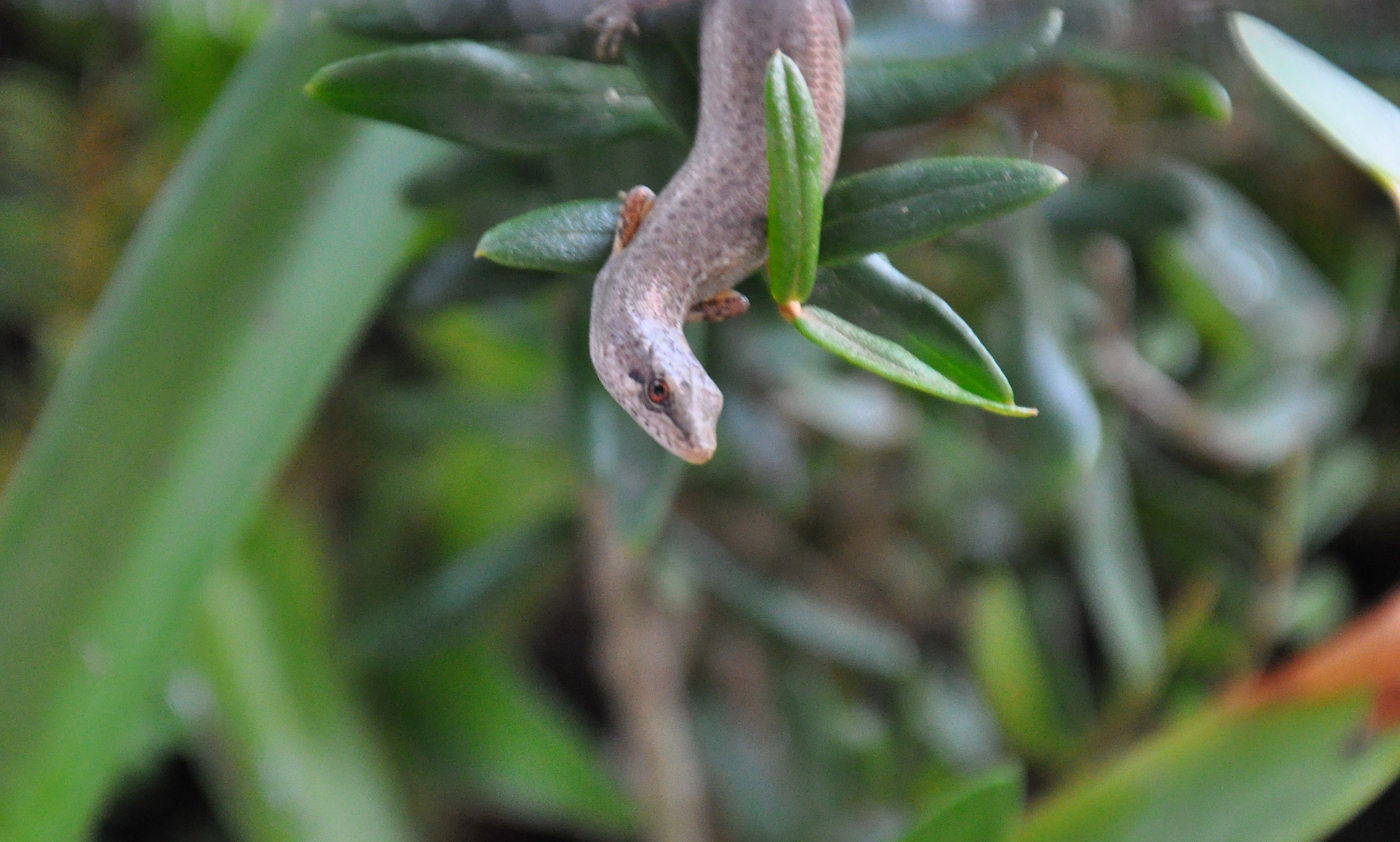
- Saproscincus mustelinus, found climbing in a small shrub.

Scientific classification
- Kingdom: Animalia
- Phylum: Chordata
- Class: Reptilia
- Order: Squamata
- Family: Scincidae
- Subfamily: Eugongylinae
- Genus: Saproscincus; Wells & Wellington, 1983

= Saproscincus =

Genus of lizards

Saproscincus is a genus of lizards, commonly referred to as shadeskinks or shade-skinks, in the subfamily Eugongylinae of the family Scincidae. The genus is endemic to Australia.

== Species ==
The genus Saproscincus contains the following 12 species.

- Saproscincus basiliscus (Ingram & Rawlinson, 1981) – pale-lipped shadeskink
- Saproscincus challengeri (Boulenger, 1887) – orange-tailed shadeskink, Border Ranges shadeskink, Challenger's skink
- Saproscincus czechurai (Ingram & Rawlinson, 1981) – wedge-snouted shadeskink, Czechuras litter-skink
- Saproscincus eungellensis Sadlier et al., 2005 – Eungella shadeskink
- Saproscincus hannahae Couper & Keim, 1998 – Hannah's shadeskink
- Saproscincus lewisi Couper & Keim, 1998 – northern wet tropics shadeskink, Cooktown shade-skink
- Saproscincus mustelinus (O'Shaughnessy, 1874) – southern weasel skink, weasel shadeskink
- Saproscincus oriarius Sadlier, 1998
- Saproscincus rosei Wells & Wellington, 1985 – orange-tailed shadeskink, highland forest skink
- Saproscincus saltus Hoskin, 2013 – Cape Melville shadeskink
- Saproscincus spectabilis (De Vis, 1888) – gully shadeskink
- Saproscincus tetradactylus (Greer & Kluge, 1980) – four-fingered shadeskink, four-toed litter-skink

Nota bene: A binomial authority in parentheses indicates that the species was originally described in a genus other than Saproscincus.
