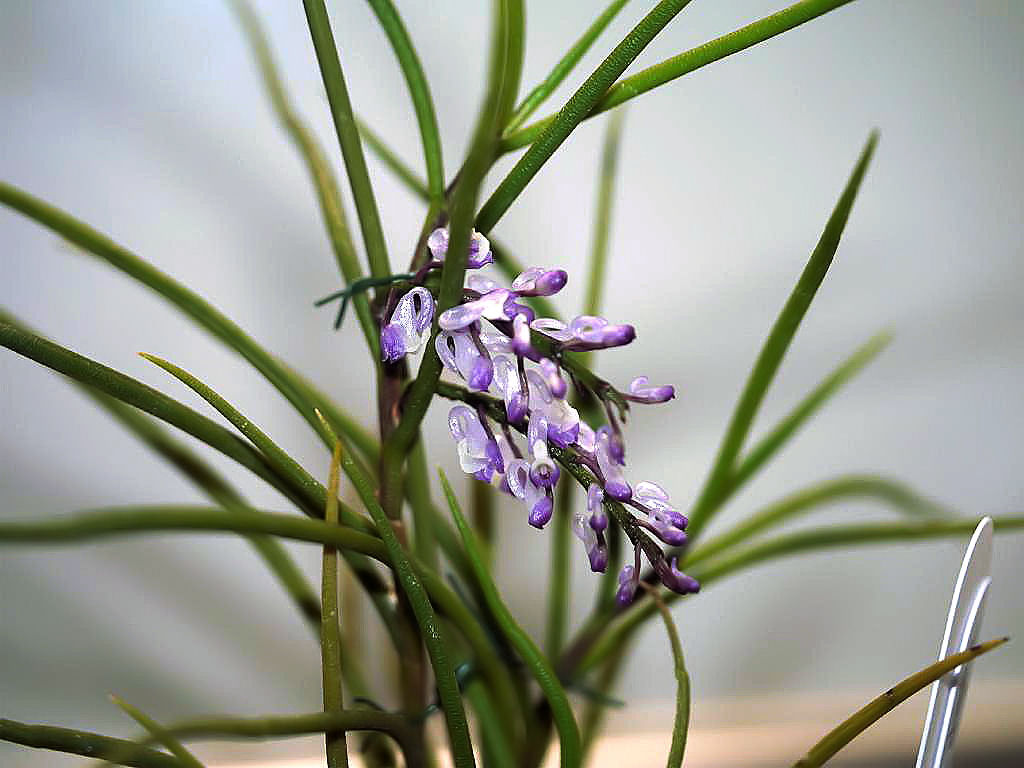

Scientific classification
- Kingdom: Plantae
- Clade: Tracheophytes
- Clade: Angiosperms
- Clade: Monocots
- Order: Asparagales
- Family: Orchidaceae
- Subfamily: Epidendroideae
- Genus: Schoenorchis
- Species: S. juncifolia

Binomial name
- Schoenorchis juncifolia Reinw. ex Blume

= Schoenorchis juncifolia =

Species of orchid

Schoenorchis juncifolia is an epiphytic orchid (family Orchidaceae) of the East Indies which is best known for its resemblance to the unrelated Spanish moss (Tillandsia usneoides) and like it hangs down in long garlands. It grows only on two species of tree: Pterophylla fraxinea (syn. Weinmannia blumei) and Castanopsis javanica.
