= Saproscincus lewisi =

Conservation status
- Least Concern (IUCN 3.1)

Scientific classification
- Kingdom: Animalia
- Phylum: Chordata
- Class: Reptilia
- Order: Squamata
- Family: Scincidae
- Genus: Saproscincus
- Species: S. lewisi

Binomial name
- Saproscincus lewisi Couper & Keim, 1998

Species of lizard

Saproscincus lewisi, also known commonly as the Cooktown shade-skink and the northern wet tropics shadeskink, is a species of lizard in the subfamily Eugongylinae of the family Scincidae. The species is endemic to Queensland in Australia.

== Etymology ==
The specific name, lewisi, is in honor of Lewis Roberts, who collected the holotype.

== Description ==
Adults of S. lewisi have a snout-to-vent length (SVL) of about 42 mm (1.7 in). At midbody the scales are arranged in 22–24 rows around the body. Dorsally, it is brown or bronze, with darker flecks.

== Habitat ==
The preferred natural habitat of S. lewisi is forest.

== Reproduction ==
S. lewisi is oviparous.
