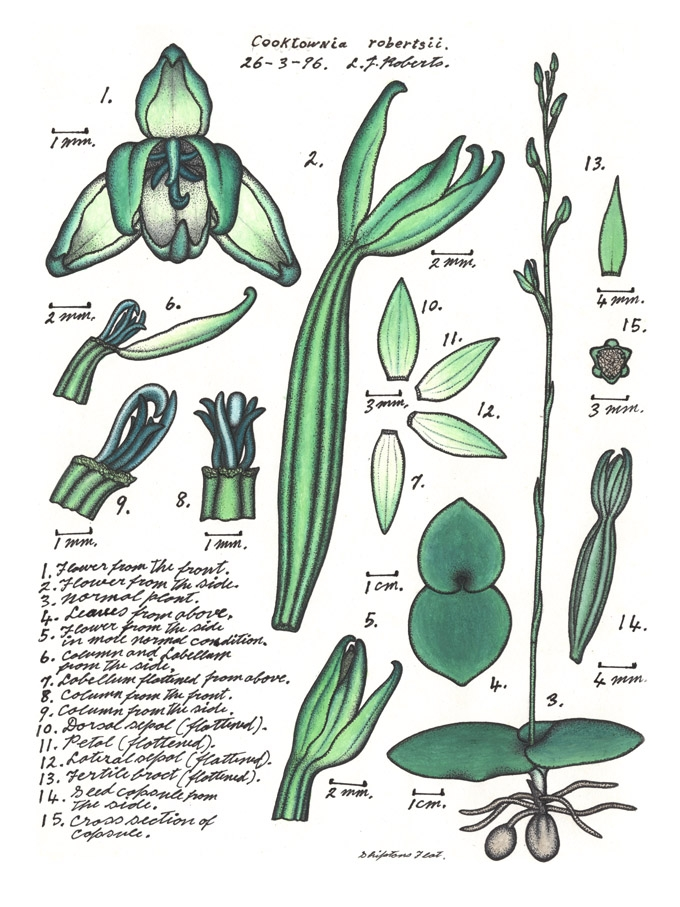
- Illustration by the discoverer: Lewis Roberts

Conservation status
- Least Concern (NCA)

Scientific classification
- Kingdom: Plantae
- Clade: Tracheophytes
- Clade: Angiosperms
- Clade: Monocots
- Order: Asparagales
- Family: Orchidaceae
- Subfamily: Orchidoideae
- Tribe: Orchideae
- Subtribe: Orchidinae
- Genus: Cooktownia; D.L.Jones
- Species: C. robertsii

Binomial name
- Cooktownia robertsii D.L.Jones

= Cooktownia =

Mystery orchid

Genus of orchids

Cooktownia robertsii, commonly known as mystery orchid, is the only species of plant in the orchid genus Cooktownia and is endemic to far north Queensland. It is a rare ground orchid, named in honour of the first scientist to discover it, Lewis Roberts and has two ground-hugging leaves and up to nine small green flowers. It is an unusual species because of its highly modified column which lacks pollen and does not have a receptive stigma.

== Description ==
Cooktownia robertsii is a tuberous, perennial herb with two dark green, ground hugging, egg-shaped to almost round leaves, 15–30 mm (0.6–1 in) long and 10–30 mm (0.4–1 in) wide with their bases overlapping. Between three and nine green flowers with darker lines, about 7 mm (0.3 in) long and 2.5 mm (0.1 in) wide are borne on a flowering stem 150–250 mm (6–10 in) tall. The sepals and petals are lance-shaped to egg-shaped, 6–7 mm (0.2–0.3 in) long and about 2.5 mm (0.1 in) wide. The labellum is about 7 mm (0.3 in) long and 2.5 mm (0.1 in) wide with its edges rolled inwards and has no spur. The flowers are apomictic, lack pollen and a receptive stigma, forming seeds without fertilisation. Flowering occurs between March and May.

== Taxonomy and naming ==
Cooktownia robertsii was first formally described in 1997 by David Jones from a specimen collected in 1993. The generic name is derived from Cooktown, the nearest town to where this orchid is found. The specific epithet (robertsii) honours Lewis Roberts who discovered the orchid near his home in Shipton's Flat near Cooktown in the 1980s.

== Distribution and habitat ==
Mystery orchid is only known from a small area south of Cooktown in tropical far north Queensland. Although it is highly localised, it can be locally common, is easily cultivated and reproduces freely. It is found in open forest in grassy areas in red gravelly or stony loam at altitudes from 300–500 m (1,000–2,000 ft), with maximum extent between March and late April.
