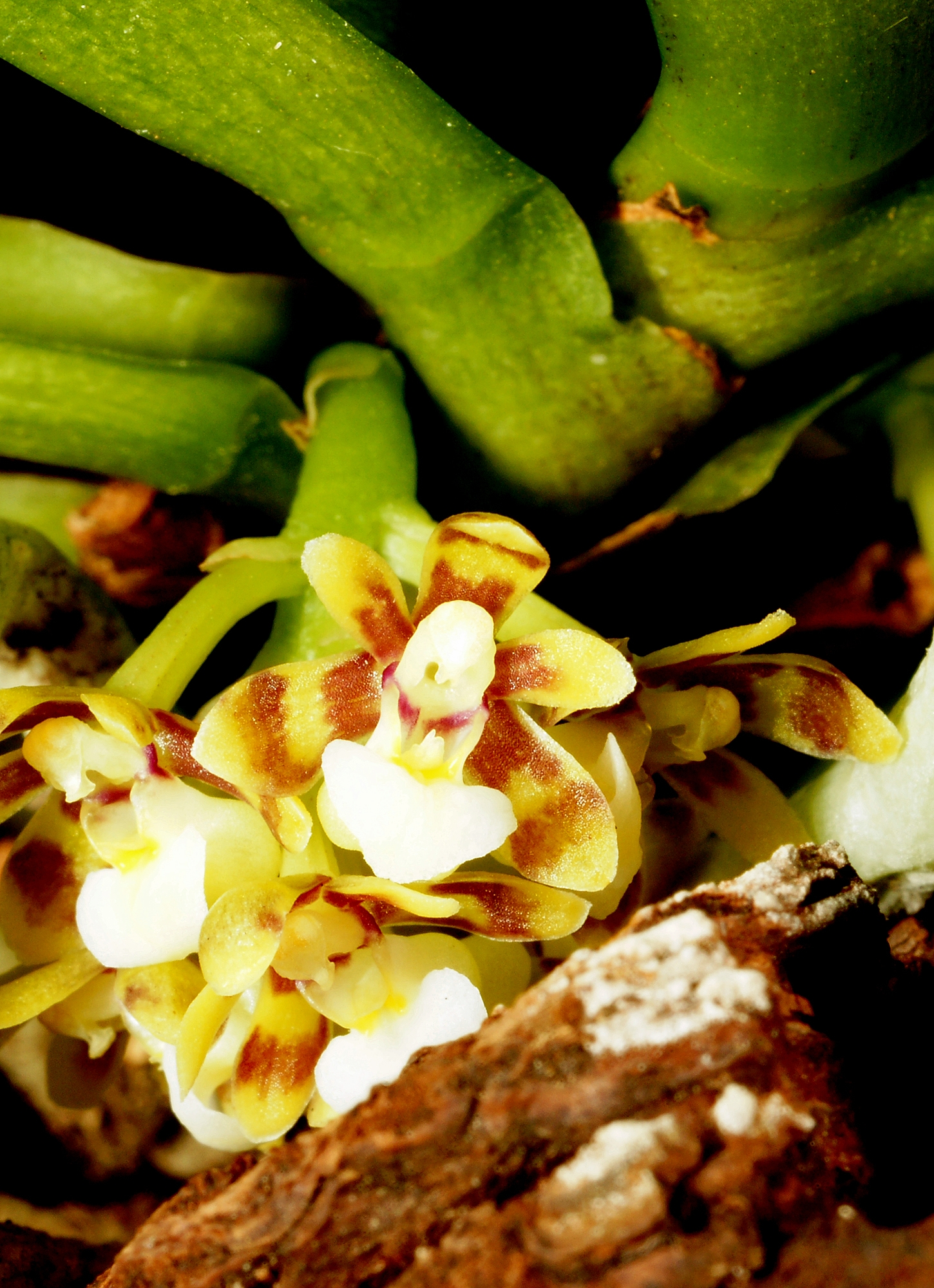
- Pomatocalpa undulatum

Scientific classification
- Kingdom: Plantae
- Clade: Tracheophytes
- Clade: Angiosperms
- Clade: Monocots
- Order: Asparagales
- Family: Orchidaceae
- Subfamily: Epidendroideae
- Tribe: Vandeae
- Subtribe: Aeridinae
- Genus: Pomatocalpa; Breda

= Pomatocalpa =

Genus of orchids

Pomatocalpa, commonly known as bladder orchids, or 鹿角兰属 (lu jiao lan shu), is a genus of about twenty five species from the orchid family, Orchidaceae. Plants in this genus are epiphytes or lithophytes with thick, leathery leaves and a large number of small flowers with a three-lobed labellum. There are about twenty five species found from tropical and subtropical Asia to the south-west Pacific.

== Description ==
Orchids in the genus Pomatocalpa are monopodial epiphytic or lithophytic herbs with long, thick roots attached to the substrate, with fibrous stems and long-lasting leaves arranged in two rows with their bases obscuring the stems. A large number of relatively small flowers are arranged on a panicle or raceme and with sepals and petals that are similar to each other and a labellum that has three lobes.

== Taxonomy and naming ==
The genus Pomatocalpa was first formally described in 1829 by Breda in Genera et Species Orchidearum et Asclepiadearum. The type species is Pomatocalpa spicatum. The name Pomatocalpa is derived from the Ancient Greek words pomatos meaning "cover", "lid", "operculum" or "gill-cover" and kalpe meaning "vessel for drawing water", "pitcher" or "urn", referring to the deeply pouched labellum.

=== Species ===
The following is a list of species accepted by the Plants of the World Online as at October 2025:

- Pomatocalpa angustifolium Seidenf. - Thailand, Vietnam
- Pomatocalpa arachnanthe (Ridl.) J.J.Sm. - Malaysia
- Pomatocalpa armigerum (King & Pantl.) Tang & F.T.Wang - Assam, Bhutan
- Pomatocalpa bambusarum (King & Pantl.) Garay - Assam, Bhutan
- Pomatocalpa bhutanicum N.P.Balakr. - Bhutan
- Pomatocalpa bicolor (Lindl.) J.J.Sm. - Philippines
- Pomatocalpa decipiens (Lindl.) J.J.Sm. - India, Bangladesh, Sri Lanka
- Pomatocalpa diffusum Breda - Thailand, Malaysia, Indonesia, Philippines
- Pomatocalpa floresanum J.J.Sm. - Flores
- Pomatocalpa fuscum (Lindl.) J.J.Sm. - Malaysia, Borneo, Philippines
- Pomatocalpa grande Seidenf. - Vietnam
- Pomatocalpa koordersii (Rolfe) J.J.Sm.
- Pomatocalpa kunstleri (Hook.f.) J.J.Sm. - Thailand, Malaysia, Indonesia, Philippines
- Pomatocalpa linearipetalum J.J.Sm. - Seram
- Pomatocalpa macphersonii (F.Muell.) T.E.Hunt - New Guinea, Queensland
- Pomatocalpa maculosum (Lindl.) J.J.Sm. - widespread from Sri Lanka and Bhutan to Java and the Philippines
  - Pomatocalpa maculosum subsp. andamanicum (Hook.f.) Watthana
  - Pomatocalpa maculosum subsp. maculosum
- Pomatocalpa marsupiale (Kraenzl.) J.J.Sm. - Queensland, Maluku, Sulawesi, New Guinea, Solomons, Vanuatu
- Pomatocalpa parvum (Ridl.) J.J.Sm. - Pahang
- Pomatocalpa simalurense J.J.Sm . - Simeuluë
- Pomatocalpa sphaetophorum (Schltr.) J.J.Sm. - Borneo
- Pomatocalpa spicatum Breda, Kuhl & Hasselt - Hainan, Assam, Bhutan, Andaman & Nicobar Islands, Indochina, Malaysia, Indonesia, Philippines
- Pomatocalpa tonkinense (Gagnep.) Seidenf. - Vietnam, Laos
- Pomatocalpa truncatum (J.J.Sm.) J.J.Sm. - Borneo
- Pomatocalpa undulatum (Lindl.) J.J.Sm - Assam, Bangladesh, Taiwan
  - Pomatocalpa undulatum subsp. acuminatum (Rolfe) Watthana
  - Pomatocalpa undulatum subsp. undulatum

== Distribution ==
Species in the genus Pomatocalpa are found from tropical and substropical Asia to the southwest Pacific.

== See also ==
- List of Orchidaceae genera
