= Saproscincus hannahae =

Conservation status
- Least Concern (IUCN 3.1)

Scientific classification
- Kingdom: Animalia
- Phylum: Chordata
- Class: Reptilia
- Order: Squamata
- Family: Scincidae
- Genus: Saproscincus
- Species: S. hannahae

Binomial name
- Saproscincus hannahae Couper & Keim, 1998

Species of lizard

Saproscincus hannahae, also known commonly as Hannah's shadeskink and Hannah's shade-skink, is a species of lizard in the family Scincidae. The species is endemic to Queensland in Australia.

== Etymology ==
The specific name, hannahae, is in honor of Hannah Couper who is the daughter of Patrick J. Couper.

== Habitat ==
The preferred natural habitat of S. hannahae is forest.

== Description ==
A small species, S. hannahae has an average snout-to-vent length (SVL) of 32 mm (1.3 in). The tail length is on average 1.3 times SVL.

== Reproduction ==
S. hannahae is oviparous.
