= Saproscincus tetradactylus =

Conservation status
- Least Concern (IUCN 3.1)

Scientific classification
- Kingdom: Animalia
- Phylum: Chordata
- Class: Reptilia
- Order: Squamata
- Suborder: Scinciformata
- Infraorder: Scincomorpha
- Family: Eugongylidae
- Genus: Saproscincus
- Species: S. tetradactylus

Binomial name
- Saproscincus tetradactylus (Greer & Kluge, 1980)

Species of lizard

Saproscincus tetradactylus, the four-fingered shadeskink or four-toed litter-skink, is a species of skink found in Queensland in Australia.
