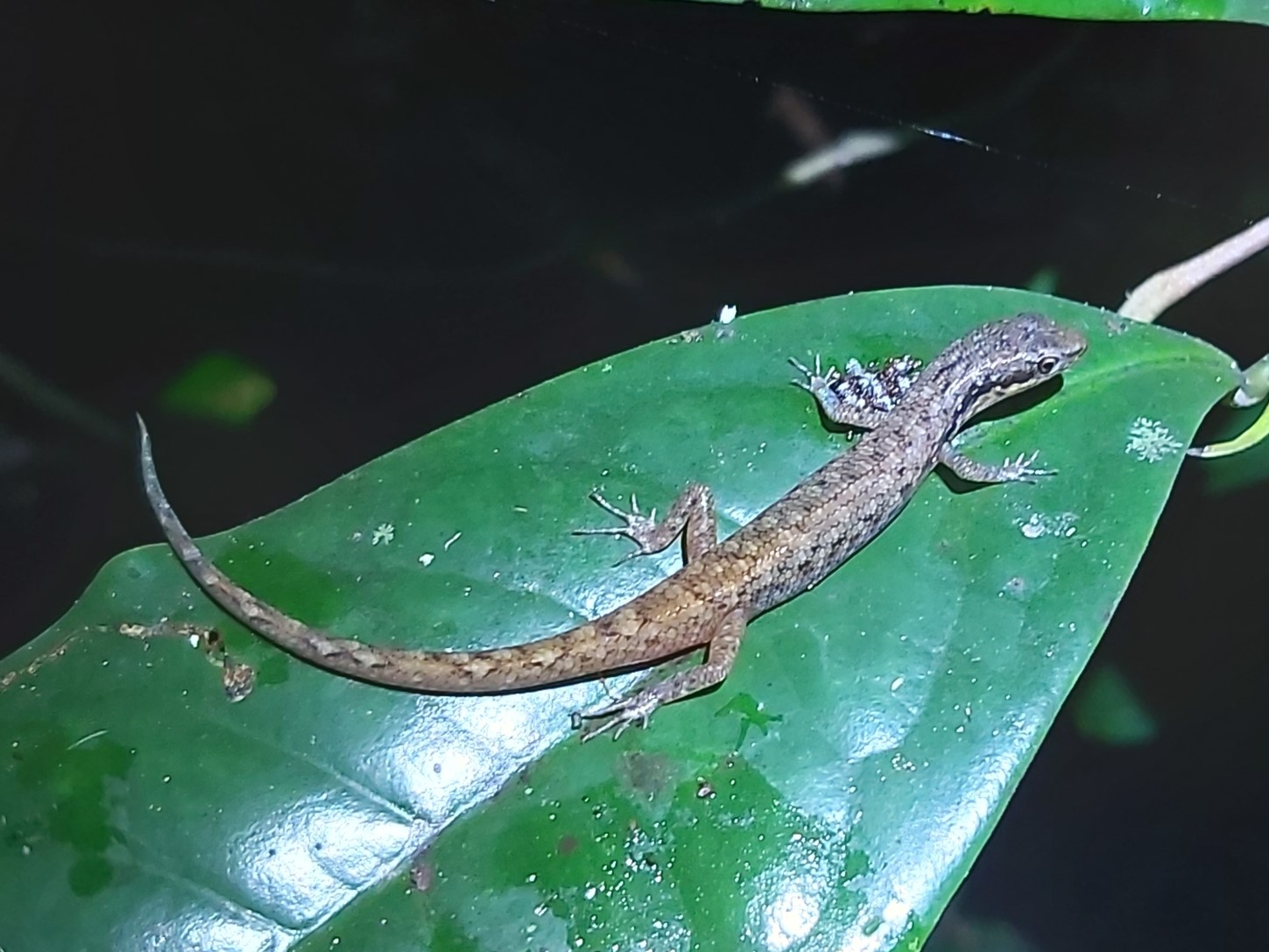

Conservation status
- Least Concern (IUCN 3.1)

Scientific classification
- Kingdom: Animalia
- Phylum: Chordata
- Class: Reptilia
- Order: Squamata
- Family: Scincidae
- Genus: Saproscincus
- Species: S. basiliscus

Binomial name
- Saproscincus basiliscus (Ingram & Rawlinson, 1981)

= Saproscincus basiliscus =

Species of lizard

The pale-lipped shadeskink (Saproscincus basiliscus) is a species of lizard in the subfamily Eugongylinae of the Family Scincidae. The species is endemic to Queensland, Australia.
