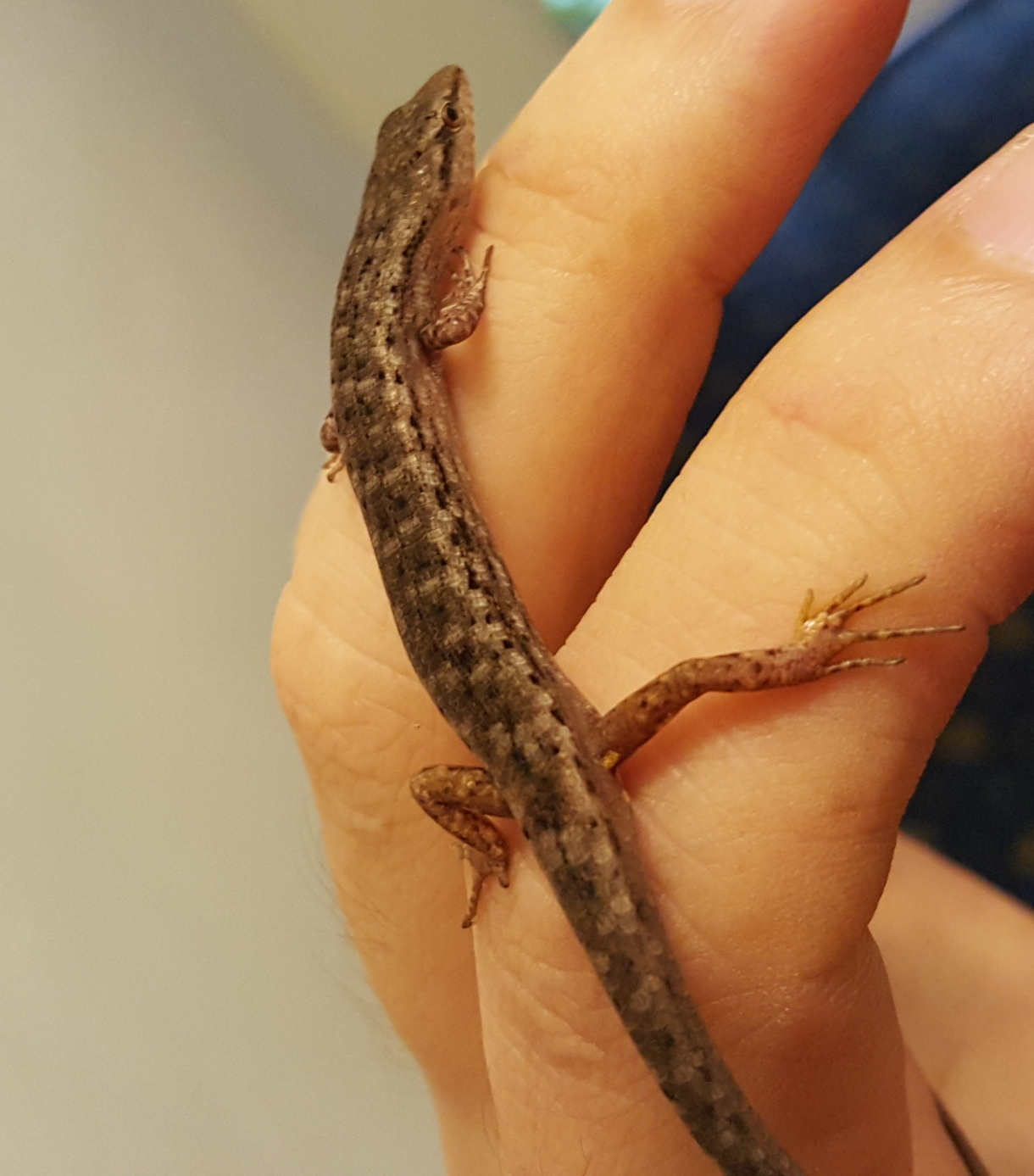

Conservation status
- Least Concern (IUCN 3.1)

Scientific classification
- Kingdom: Animalia
- Phylum: Chordata
- Order: Squamata
- Family: Scincidae
- Genus: Saproscincus
- Species: S. spectabilis

Binomial name
- Saproscincus spectabilis (De Vis, 1888)

Synonyms
- Saproscincus galli Wells & Wellington, 1985

= Saproscincus spectabilis =

Species of lizard

Saproscinus spectabilis known as the gully shadeskink is a small lizard found in Queensland and New South Wales, Australia. The habitat is cool, shaded gullies where it feeds on small insects. It may be seen on sunny rocky outcrops within gullies. Ground cover and rocky cracks are required to avoid predation from birds such as the kookaburra and pied currawong.
