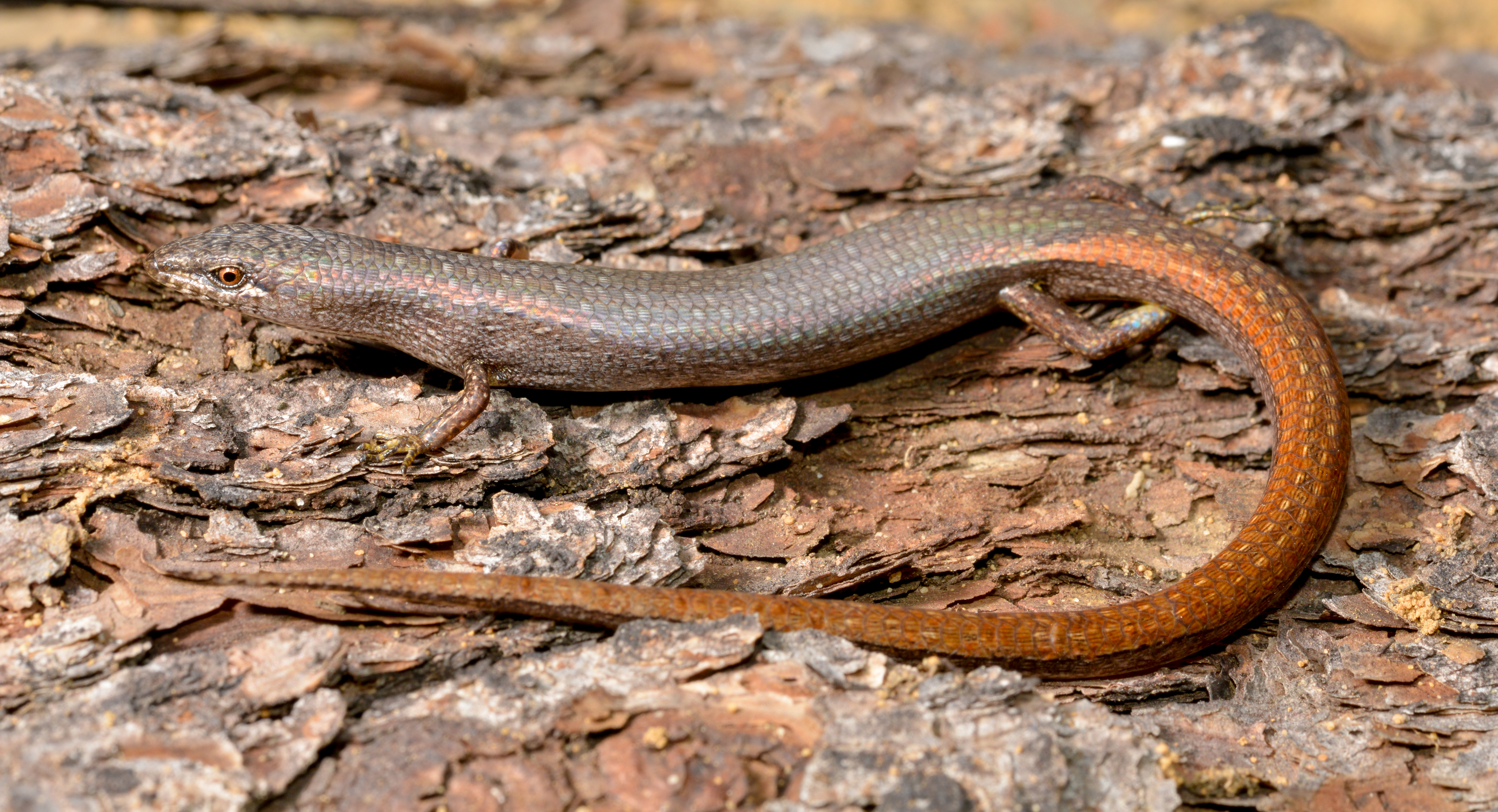

Conservation status
- Least Concern (IUCN 3.1)

Scientific classification
- Kingdom: Animalia
- Phylum: Chordata
- Class: Reptilia
- Order: Squamata
- Family: Scincidae
- Genus: Saproscincus
- Species: S. mustelinus

Binomial name
- Saproscincus mustelinus (O'Shaghnessy, 1874)

Synonyms
- Mocoa mustelina O'Shaughnessy, 1874; Lygosoma mustelinum — M.A. Smith, 1937; Lamropholis mustelina — Greer, 1974; Saproscincus mustelinus — Wells & Wellington, 1983

= Saproscincus mustelinus =

Species of lizard

Saproscincus mustelinus, commonly known as the southern weasel skink or weasel shadeskink, is a small species of skink which is endemic to Australia.

== Behavior ==
S. mustelinus is usually nocturnal, but is most active in the evening and warm mornings.

== Diet ==
S. mustelinus hunts and feeds on small insects and other small invertebrates.

== Description ==
The southern weasel skink is around 45 mm (1.8 in) from snout to vent, is covered in iridescent reddish brown (fine) scales, and has several distinctive white marks behind and below the eye.

== Defensive behavior ==
If frightened this skink has the ability to lose its tail as a defence mechanism; the tail lies on the ground twitching, distracting the predator so the skink can escape.

== Habitat ==
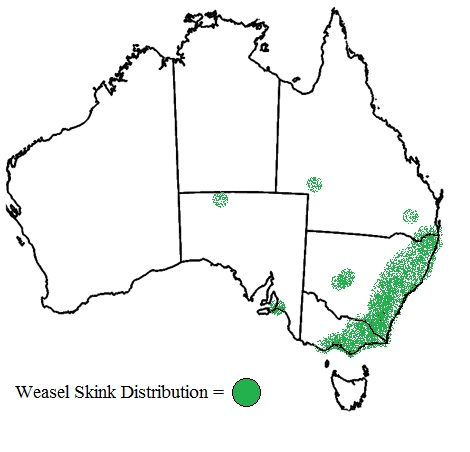
Saproscincus mustelinus habitat.

The southern weasel skink tends to utilize existing vegetation and fallen timber for shelter.

== Geographic range ==
The southern weasel skink's distribution forms a coastal strip from south Victoria to southern Queensland.

== Reproduction ==
Females lay up to four eggs per clutch in a communal nest. The nests are normally a dugout, a burrow, which contain the eggs of numerous females. Laying normally occurs between spring and late summer.
