= Saproscincus oriarius =

Scientific classification
- Domain: Eukaryota
- Kingdom: Animalia
- Phylum: Chordata
- Class: Reptilia
- Order: Squamata
- Family: Scincidae
- Genus: Saproscincus
- Species: S. oriarius

Binomial name
- Saproscincus oriarius Sadlier, 1998

Species of lizard

Saproscincus oriarius is a species of skink found in New South Wales in Australia.
