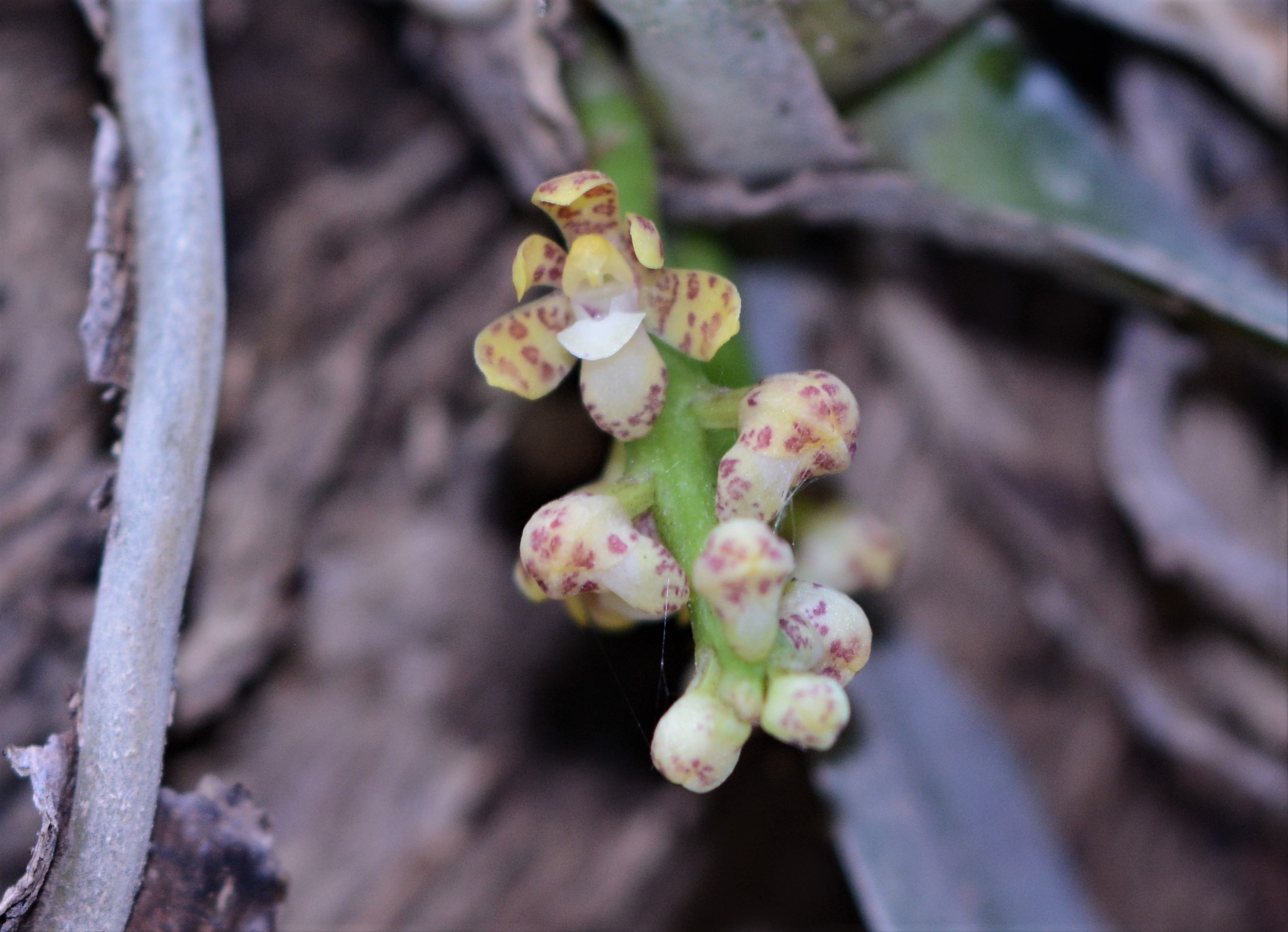

Scientific classification
- Kingdom: Plantae
- Clade: Tracheophytes
- Clade: Angiosperms
- Clade: Monocots
- Order: Asparagales
- Family: Orchidaceae
- Subfamily: Epidendroideae
- Genus: Pomatocalpa
- Species: P. macphersonii

Binomial name
- Pomatocalpa macphersonii (F.Muell.) T.E.Hunt

Synonyms
- Cleisostoma macphersoni Benth. orth. var.; Cleisostoma macphersonii (F.Muell.) Benth.; Saccolabium macphersonii F.Muell.; Sarcanthus macphersonii (F.Muell.) Rupp; Sarcochilus macphersoni F.Muell. orth. var.; Sarcochilus macphersonii (F.Muell.) F.Muell.

= Pomatocalpa macphersonii =

Species of orchid

Pomatocalpa macphersonii, commonly known as the blotched bladder orchid, is an epiphytic or lithophytic orchid with thick, cord-like roots, between two and eight dark green, leathery leaves and up to thirty cup-shaped, yellow flowers with red blotches and a white labellum with red blotches. It usually grows on rainforest trees and is found in New Guinea and tropical North Queensland, Australia.

== Description ==
Pomatocalpa macphersonii is an epiphytic or lithophytic herb with a single main flattened stem, 50–100 millimetres (2.0–3.9 in) long and thick, cord-like roots. There are between two and eight dark green, thin, stiff oblong leaves 150–250 mm (5.9–9.8 in) long and 30–35 mm (1.2–1.4 in) wide.

Between three and thirty cup-shaped yellow flowers with red blotches, 7–10 mm (0.28–0.39 in) long and wide are borne on a stiff flowering stem 15–40 mm (0.59–1.6 in) long and hanging downwards. The sepals and petals are 3–5 mm (0.12–0.20 in) long, about 2.5 mm (0.098 in) wide. The labellum is white with a red blotches, 3–4 mm (0.12–0.16 in) long, 4–5 mm (0.16–0.20 in) wide with three lobes. The side lobes are erect and the middle lobe is fleshy and downturned with a spur about 2 mm (0.079 in) long. Flowering occurs from July to October.

== Taxonomy and naming ==
The blotched bladder orchid was first formally described in 1870 by Ferdinand von Mueller as Saccolabium macphersonii. He published the description in Fragmenta phytographiae Australiae from a specimen collected by John Dallachy near Rockingham Bay in Queensland. In 1958 Trevor Hunt changed the name to Pomatocalpa macphersonii. The specific epithet (macphersonii) honours John Alexander MacPherson.

== Distribution and habitat ==
Plectorrhiza macphersonii usually grows on the trunks and large branches of trees in rainforest at altitudes up to 1,000 m (3,300 ft). It is found in New Guinea and in Queensland on the Cape York Peninsula and as far south as Rockhampton.
