= Saproscincus rosei =

Conservation status
- Least Concern (IUCN 3.1)

Scientific classification
- Kingdom: Animalia
- Phylum: Chordata
- Class: Reptilia
- Order: Squamata
- Family: Scincidae
- Genus: Saproscincus
- Species: S. rosei

Binomial name
- Saproscincus rosei Wells & Wellington, 1985

Species of lizard

Saproscincus rosei, the orange-tailed shadeskink, is a species of skink found in New South Wales and Queensland in Australia.
