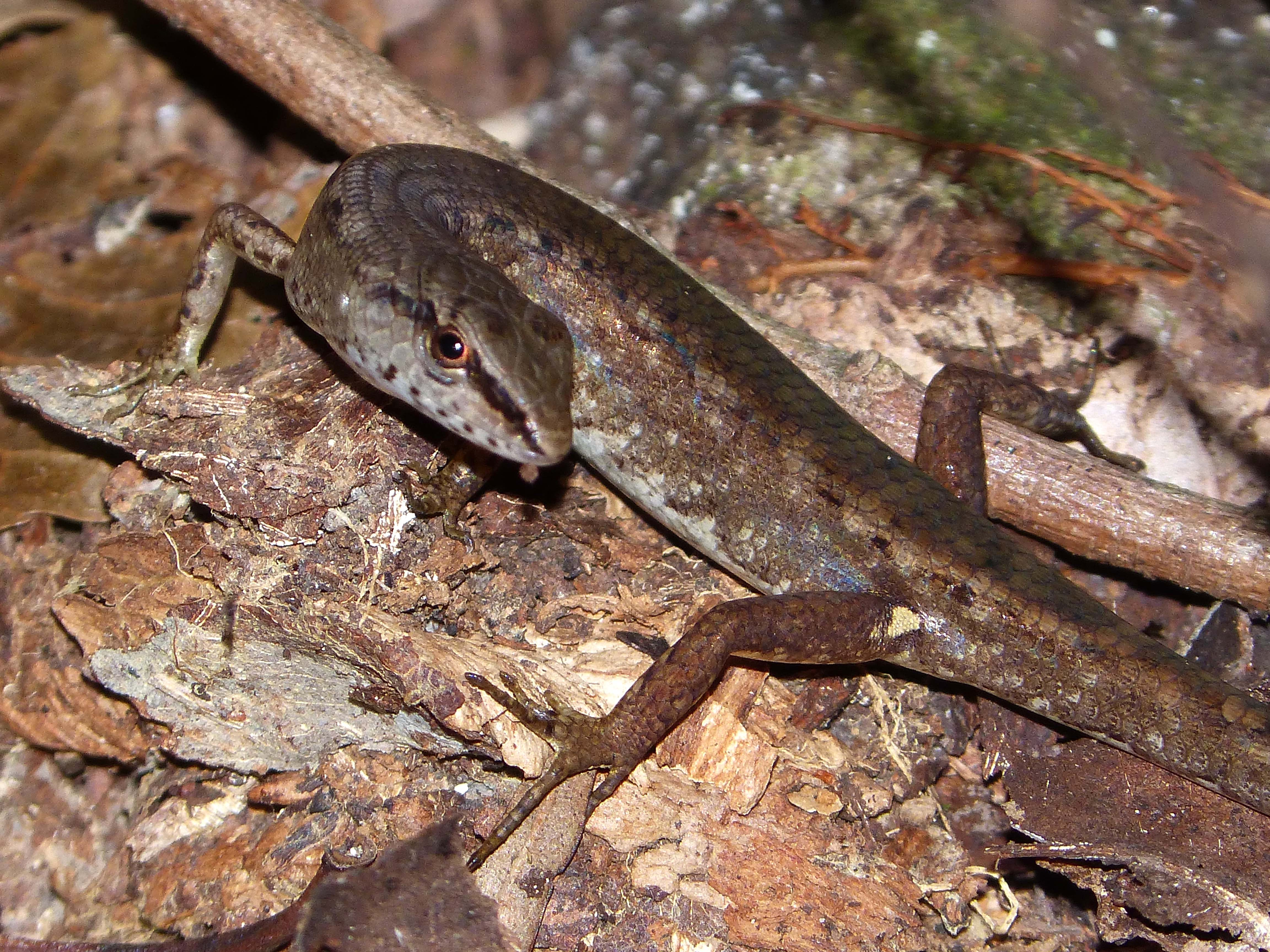

Conservation status
- Least Concern (IUCN 3.1)

Scientific classification
- Kingdom: Animalia
- Phylum: Chordata
- Class: Reptilia
- Order: Squamata
- Family: Scincidae
- Genus: Saproscincus
- Species: S. challengeri

Binomial name
- Saproscincus challengeri (Boulenger, 1887)

Synonyms
- Lygosoma challengeri Boulenger, 1887; Lygosoma (Leiolopisma) challengeri — M.A. Smith, 1937; Lampropholis challengeri — Greer, 1974; Saproscincus challengeri — Sadlier, Colgan & Shea, 1993

= Saproscincus challengeri =

Species of lizard

Saproscincus challengeri, also known commonly as the Border Ranges shadeskink, Challenger's skink, the challenging shade skink, and the orange-tailed shadeskink, is a species of lizard in the family Scincidae. The species is native to New South Wales and Queensland in Australia.

== Etymology ==
George Albert Boulenger, herpetologist at the British Museum (Natural History) named S. challengeri after the Challenger expedition in 1887.

== Habitat ==
The preferred natural habitat of S. challengeri is forest, at altitudes from sea level to 500 m (1,600 ft).

== Reproduction ==
S. challengeri is oviparous.
