= Lewis Roberts (naturalist) =

Australian naturalist and botanical illustrator

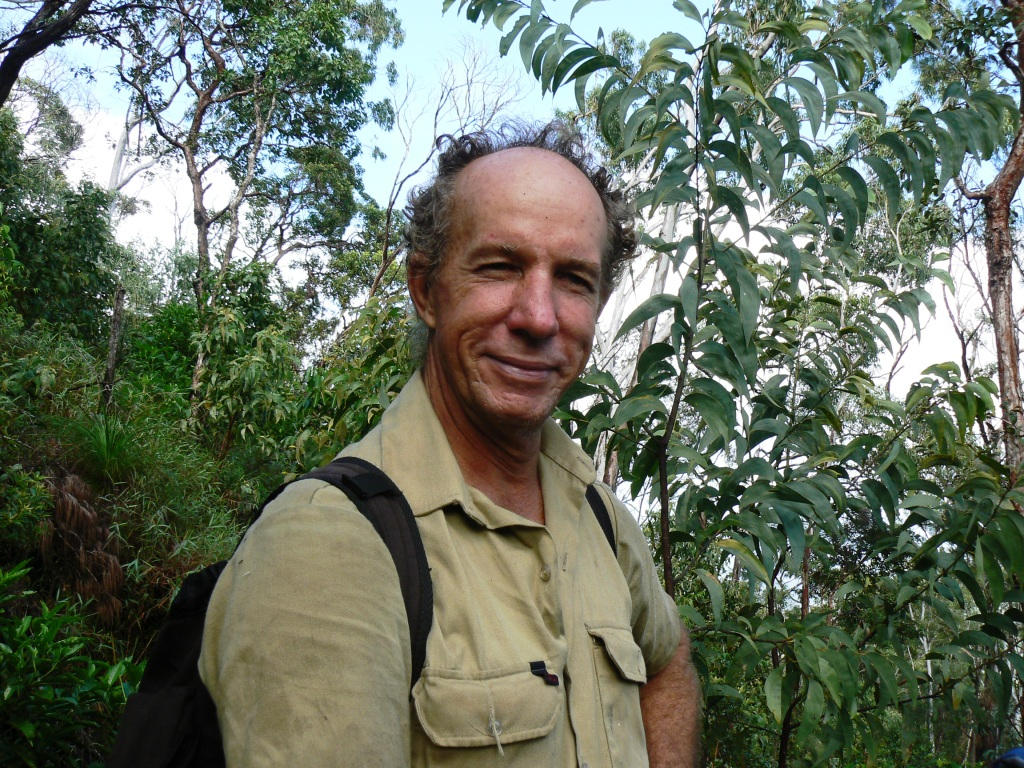
Lewis Roberts. Photo by Jan Howard, 2007.

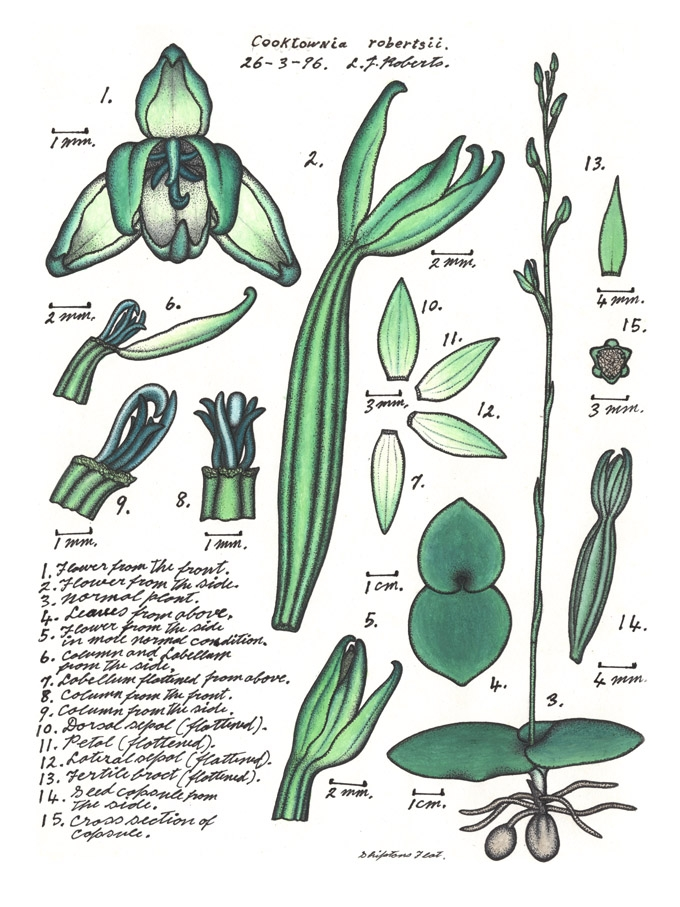
The Mystery Orchid, Cooktownia robertsii, discovered and illustrated by Lewis Roberts

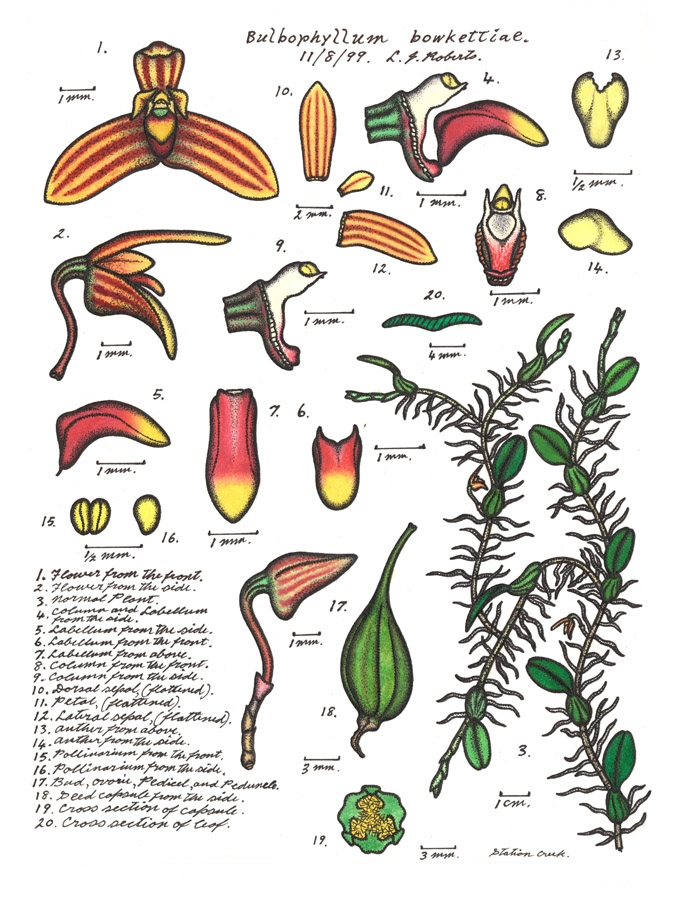
The Striped Snake Orchid, Bulbophyllum bowkettiae. Illustration by Lewis Roberts.

Lewis Roberts (born 1950) is an Australian naturalist and botanical illustrator. Lewis and his brother, Charlie Roberts, are probably the leading experts on the flora and fauna of south-eastern part Cape York Peninsula and the northern Wet Tropics area. For three generations his family has lived at Shipton's Flat, about 45 km south of Cooktown, where he and Charlie were home-schooled. His father, Jack Lewis, was a tin miner and self-taught naturalist.

== Background ==
Since about 1960, most of the botanists and zoologists who have conducted research in their area have sought advice or field assistance from the Roberts brothers. Both are "Honoraries" to the Queensland Museum.

Lewis Roberts has a particular interest in orchids, especially the species of Cape York Peninsula and the Wet Tropics. He commenced serious study in 1973.

Since then, he has collected many specimens, and discovered seven new species, including an unusual orchid, known only at Shipton's Flat, for the National Herbarium in Canberra. This ground orchid, which has been listed in a new genus of its own, was named Cooktownia robertsii, in Lewis' honour. Lewis discovered this rare ground orchid in the 1980s and it was formally described by David Jones, one of Australia's leading orchid taxonomists, in 1997.

Many of the local orchid species are rare and have very specific and limited ranges, occurring only in remote, inaccessible places such as particular mountain peaks, swamps or types of rain forest accessible only on foot. Additionally, most orchids flower seasonally, and some for only one or two days a year.

In 1993, Lewis began to draw the orchids he found. He is a self-taught botanical illustrator. His early works were in pencil done purely as an aid to identification. He was fastidious about showing the most minute details. He showed some of his penciled works to visiting fellow naturalists, and prompted by them, Lewis began colouring and highlighting his illustrations. He has devised his own techniques to capture the scale and complexity of his subjects, many of which are barely visible to the naked eye.

Lewis works in pencil to outline his subject using a magnifying glass, when necessary. He captures the colour of the subject in watercolour, then highlights and shades with pen and ink.

Lewis hopes to illustrate a specimen of every orchid species found in north-eastern Queensland. There are over 250 species known in the region and he has completed illustrations of well over 100. Once he has finished the series, Lewis hopes to publish them, along with his field observations on each species, but it will take many more years to illustrate them all.

Following the conventions of botanical illustration, Lewis records his subjects comprehensively – plant, flower and fruit. He also dissects the flowers of each to show its various parts – petals, sepal, column, labellum, anther and pollinia.

The process is exacting and time-consuming. Not allowing for time taken to find suitable specimens of particular species – some take years – each illustration takes between 2 and 3 days to complete, depending on the complexity and size of the plant.

Lewis leads many groups of naturalists and hikers and is renowned for his knowledge and bush skills. He always goes bushwalking (hiking) barefoot, and has only worn shoes a few times in his life mainly on special occasions, such as when he was married, at the opening of his first exhibition at Nature's Powerhouse, and when presented with the Medal of the Order of Australia (OAM) in 2005.

A species of Australian lizard, Saproscincus lewisi, is named in his honor.

== Exhibitions ==
Over 80 prints of his orchid illustrations are held at Nature's PowerHouse Environment and Interpretive Centre in the Cooktown Botanic Gardens, where some are on display. The collection was exhibited at the opening of the Mackay Botanic Gardens and travels to other galleries.

There was a major exhibition of prints of Lewis' work was held in Nature's PowerHouse from 24 October 2004, which lasted for a month.

Another exhibition of his prints was displayed at the Foyer Gallery in Atherton, Queensland from 3 to 28 May 2010.

== See also ==
- List of Australian botanical illustrators
