= Siddheshwar temple =

Siddheshwar temple may refer to various Shiva Hindu temples in India:

- Siddhesvara Temple, Haveri, Karnataka
- Siddheshwar Mandir, Palari, Chhattisgarh
- Siddheshwar Temple, Solapur, Maharashtra
- Siddheshwar Temple, Toka, Maharashtra
- Siddheshwar Temple, Hemadpanti, an 11th-century temple in Hottal, Nanded, Maharashtra
- Siddhesvara Siva Temple, Odisha
- Siddheswara Swamy Temple, Talakona, Andhra Pradesh, India
- Siddheshwar & Ratneshwar Temple, near Latur in Maharashtra

== See also ==
- Siddheshwar (disambiguation)
  - Siddheshwar, 12th-century Indian mystic and Kannada poet
