= Siddheshwar (disambiguation) =

Siddheshwar was a 12th-century mystic and Kannada poet.

Siddheshwar may also refer to:

- Shiva, a major Hindu god
- Siddheshwar, Achham, a business center in Sanphebagar Municipality, Nepal
- Siddheshwar, Bhojpur, a village development committee in Kosi Zone, Nepal
- Siddheshwar, Baitadi, a village development committee, Mahakali Zone, Nepal
- Siddheshwar, Palpa, a village development committee in Lumbini Zone, Nepal
- Siddheshwar, Raigad, a small village in Maharashtra, India

== See also ==
- Siddheshwar temple (disambiguation)
- Siddheshwar Express, a passenger train in India
- Siddheswara Swamy Temple, Talakona, Andhra Pradesh, India
- Siddheshwari, a 1989 Indian Hindi-language documentary film
- Siddheshwari, Sindhuli, Janakpur Zone, Nepal
