= Turahalli Forest =

Forest in Bengaluru, Karnataka, India

Thurahalli Forest
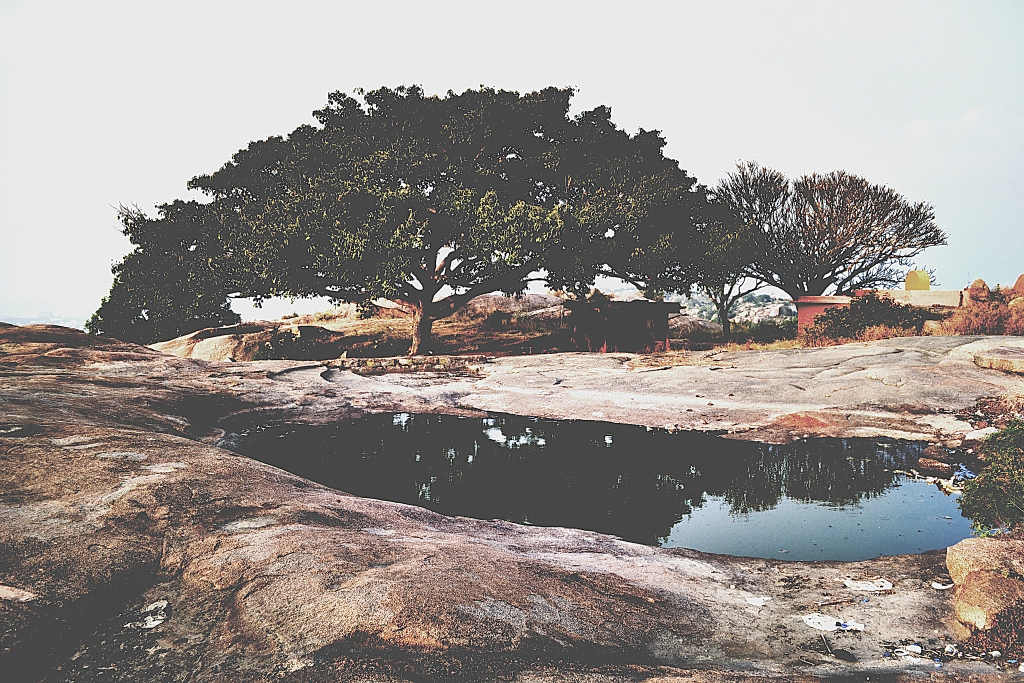

- Location within Bengaluru

Geography
- Location: Bengaluru, Karnataka, India
- Coordinates: 12.8816831°N 77.5249823°E
- Elevation: 888 m (2,913 ft)
- Area: 590 acres (240 ha)

Administration
- Status: protected, endangered
- Authority: Karnataka Forest Department

Ecology
- Ecosystem: India
- Disturbance: forest fires, garbage dumping
- Dominant tree species: Eucalyptus

The Thurahalli Forest or Thurahalli Park is a dry and deciduous forest. It is located about 20 km from Bengaluru off Kanakapura Road. It is 13 km from Banashankari and can be overseen from the NICE road. The Turahalli Forest is divided in three parts, the Turahalli State Forest, the Turahalli Minor Forest (where there's a Tree Park), and a section near Dr Rajkumar's Samadhi. Entry inside the Turahalli State Forest section has been banned for everybody as it is now a reserved forest but visitors can enter the Tree Park. However, the surrounding roads have become a hot spot for cyclists and runners alike.

It features a small Shani temple on top of a rocky hill. As of today, Thurahalli forest is said to be Bengaluru's only surviving forest.

Rocks in the forest used to provide outdoor bouldering opportunities to the cities residents and had multiple established routes.

== Wildlife ==
=== Flora ===
The majority of trees are eucalyptus. During August, the orchids (Habenaria roxburghii) bloom, giving a brilliant white colour to contrast the green of the forest. The rocky terrains are great for lianas, the most common being Opilia amentacea. They bloom during the summer. These are mostly located in the Northern edge of the forest, surrounded by figs (Ficus tinctoria), nerale-mara (Syzygium cumini) and rocks. The most common herb is the Byttneria herbacea. It blooms throughout the year. Its flowers attract many beetles. Legumes, specifically Indigofera karnatakana are found here. Ixora pavetta bloom during the summer. They have an intoxicating fragrance.

=== Fauna ===
Many animals can be spotted, including spotted deer, wild boar, hares, jackals, lizards, mongooses, etc. Turahalli is also famous for its bird population, which includes rare jungle birds like Eagle-owl, Sirkeer malkoha, common flameback woodpecker, and blue rock thrush, in addition to relatively common jungle birds like peafowl, Asian green bee-eater, paradise flycatcher, white-throated fantail flycatcher, jungle babbler, rufous treepie, black drongo, white-breasted kingfisher, pond heron, spotted dove, purple-rumped sunbird, oriental white-eye, barn swallow, red-rumped swallow, small minivet, white-browed bulbul, red-vented bulbul, common iora, oriental magpie robin; birds of the plains like rufous-tailed lark and pied bushchat, in addition to common urban birds like house crows, jungle crows, common mynas, black kites, brahminy kites, blue rock pigeons, Asian koels, and more.

The Turahalli forest also houses four leopards. These leopards have occasionally been sighted in the vicinity of the forest spurring joy and anxiety amongst nearby residents.

== Activities ==
Cycling is no longer allowed inside the turahalli reserve forest. Turahalli used to offer excellent biking trails. It is also among the few places within the city for natural rock climbing in addition to Avathi and Raogodlu. Rocks are granite, with various sizes and shapes. Many climbers used to practice regularly, in preparation for local or international competitions.

== Endangerment ==
The forest is the last one surviving in Bengaluru. It has slowly been encroached upon. It has also been used as an illegal garbage dump, which has negatively affected the wildlife. Frequent fires during the summers, both natural and those caused by locals, have significantly impacted certain species of plants that grow in this forest. The BBMP also opened a sewage treatment plant near the forest. There is also a problem with poaching. Land has also been illegally cleared to grow crops. Over the past few years, efforts have been made by nearby residents to clean up and to prevent further encroachment and dumping of waste in the forest.

There was also a plan by the state government to construct a tree park in reserved forest area. But this plan was opposed by local residents. In response to these concerns, the Karnataka Government put the plan on hold.

== Gallery ==
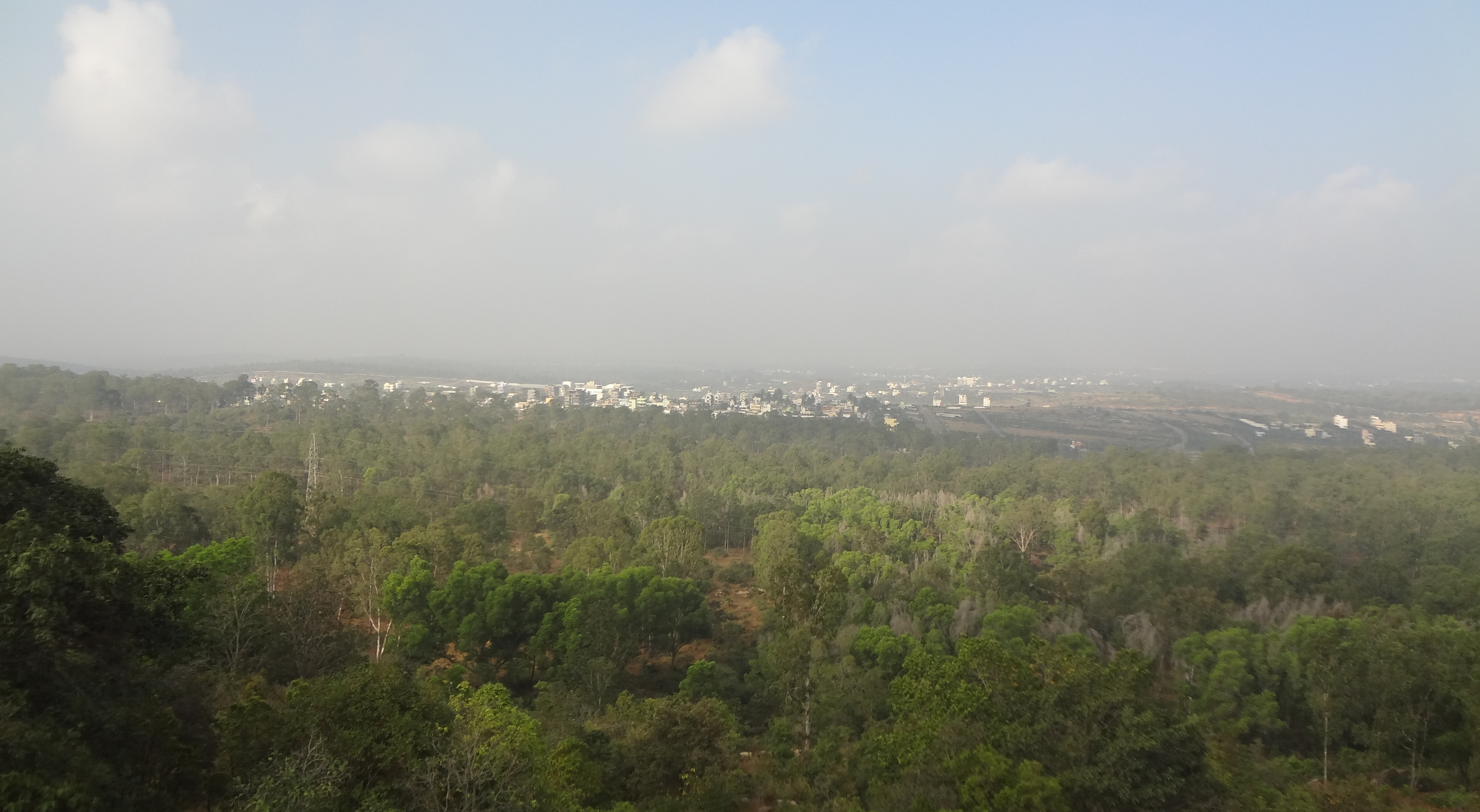
View from Turahalli Forest

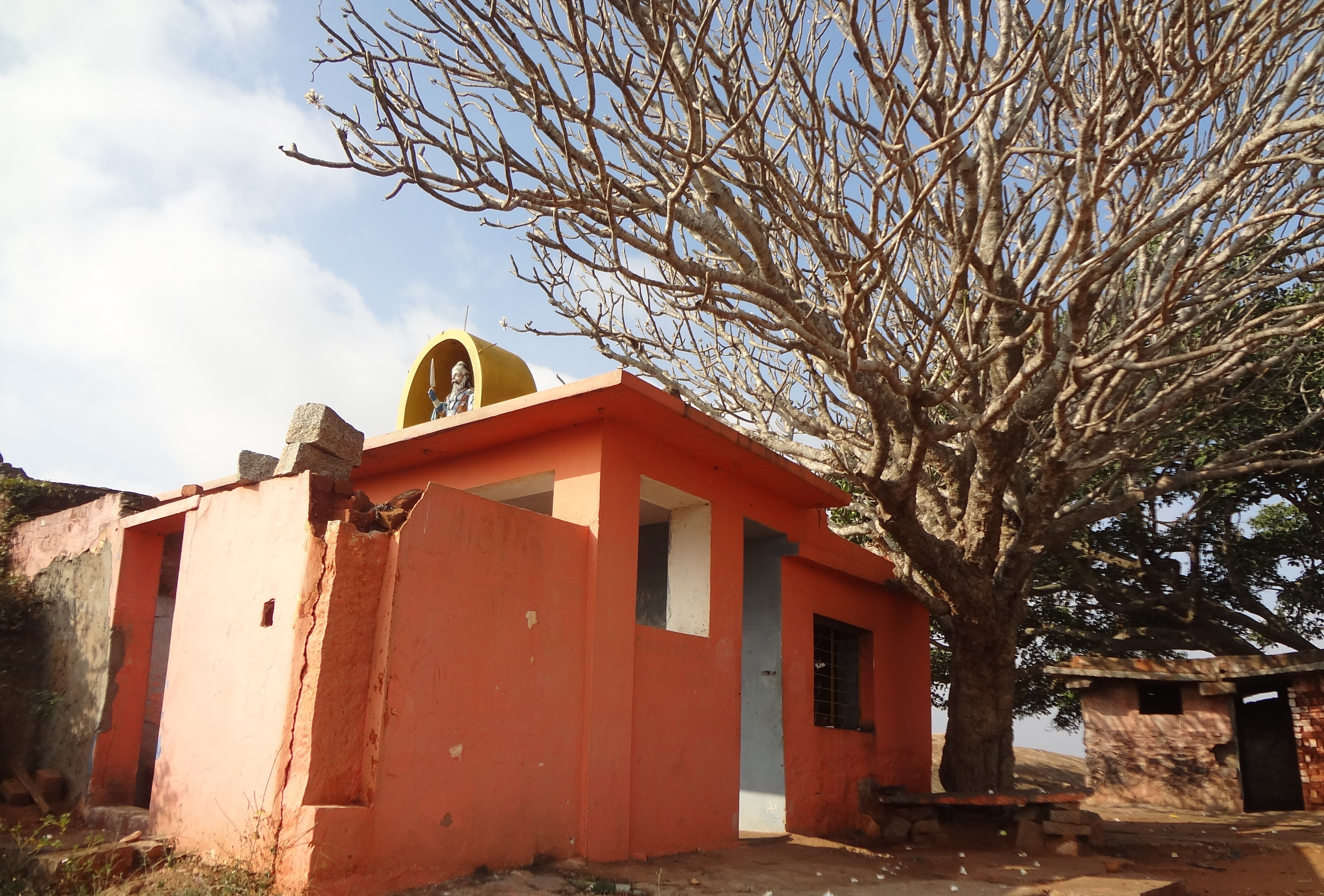
Temple near the view-point

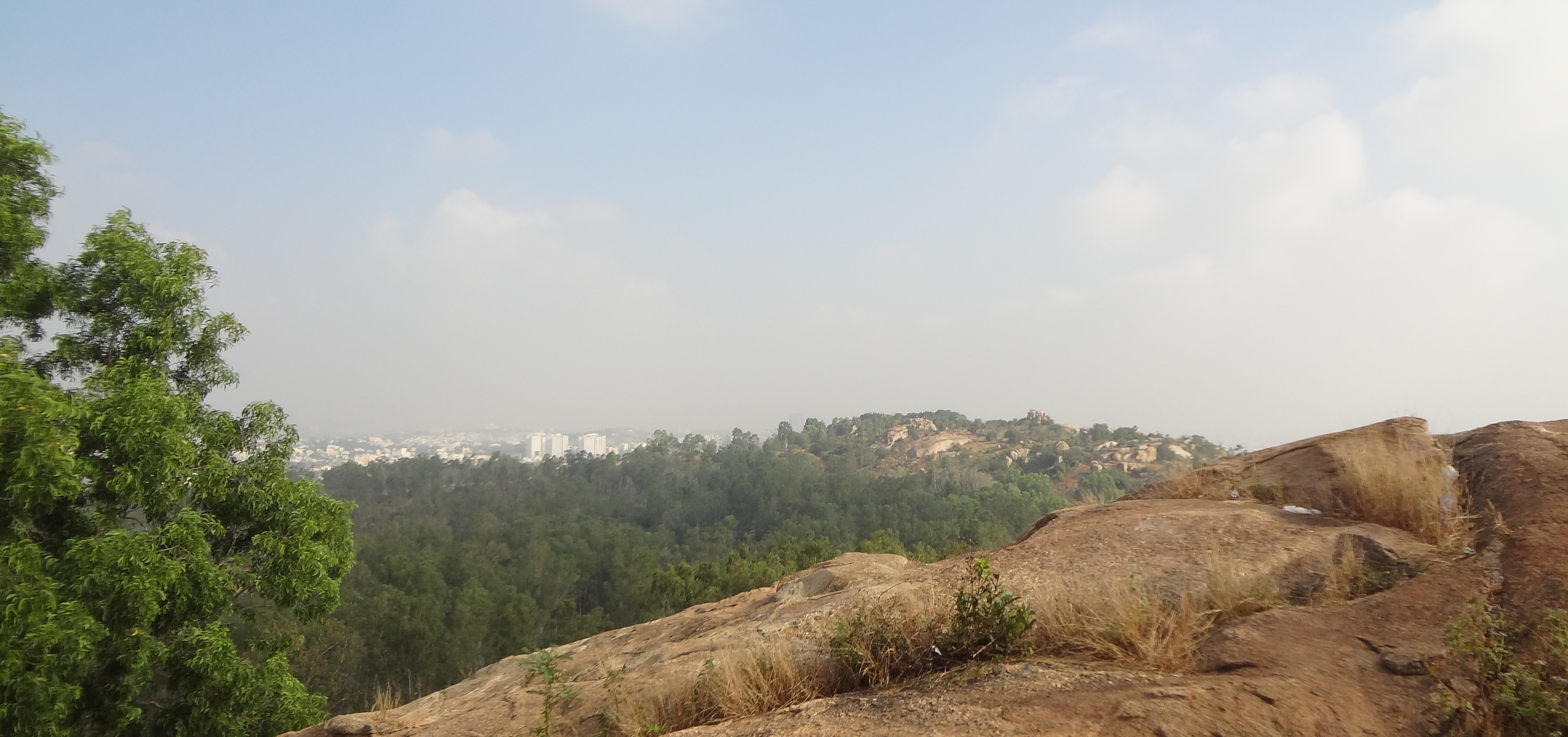
View of city as seen from rock in Turahalli Forest

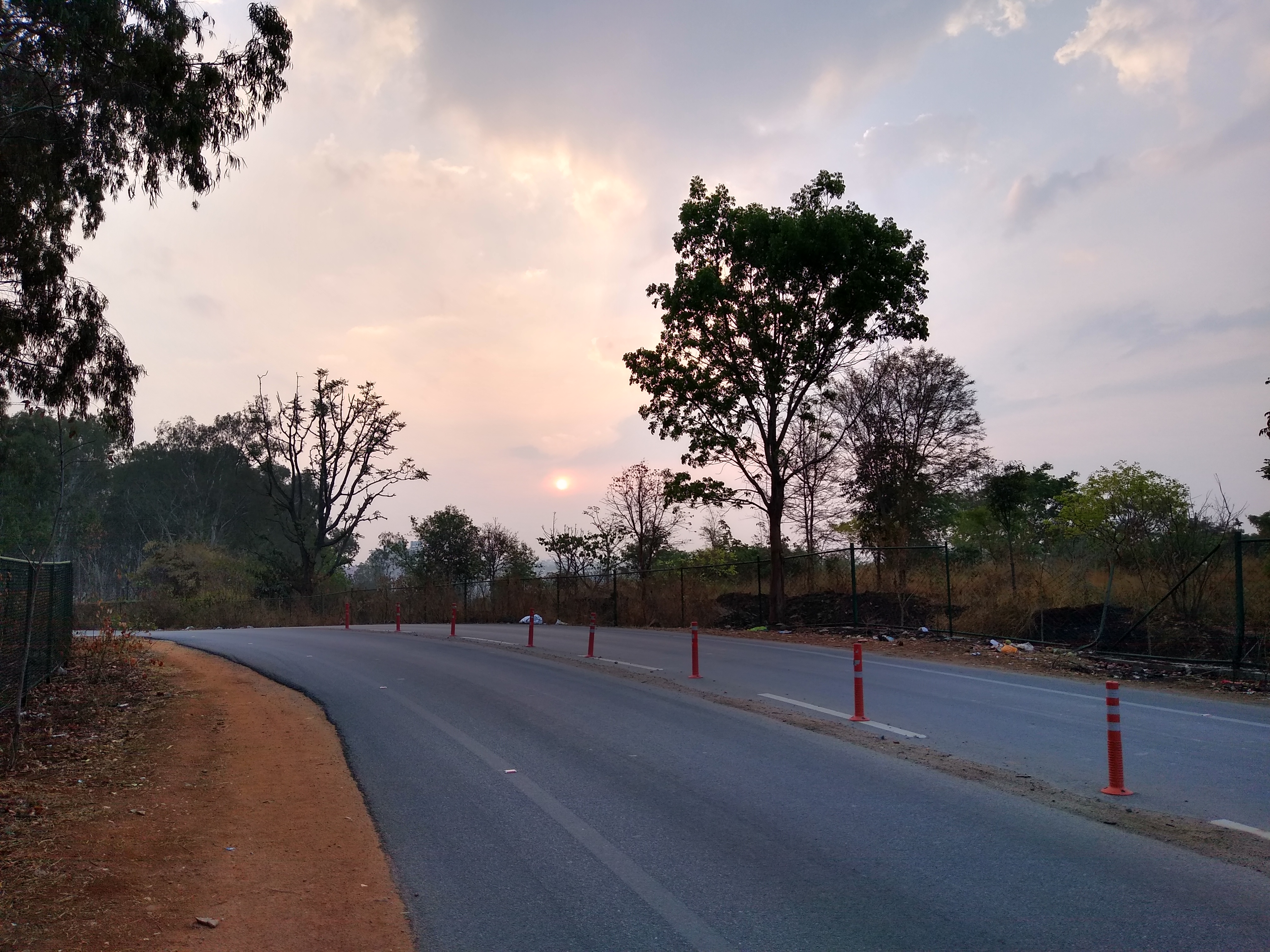
Sunrise

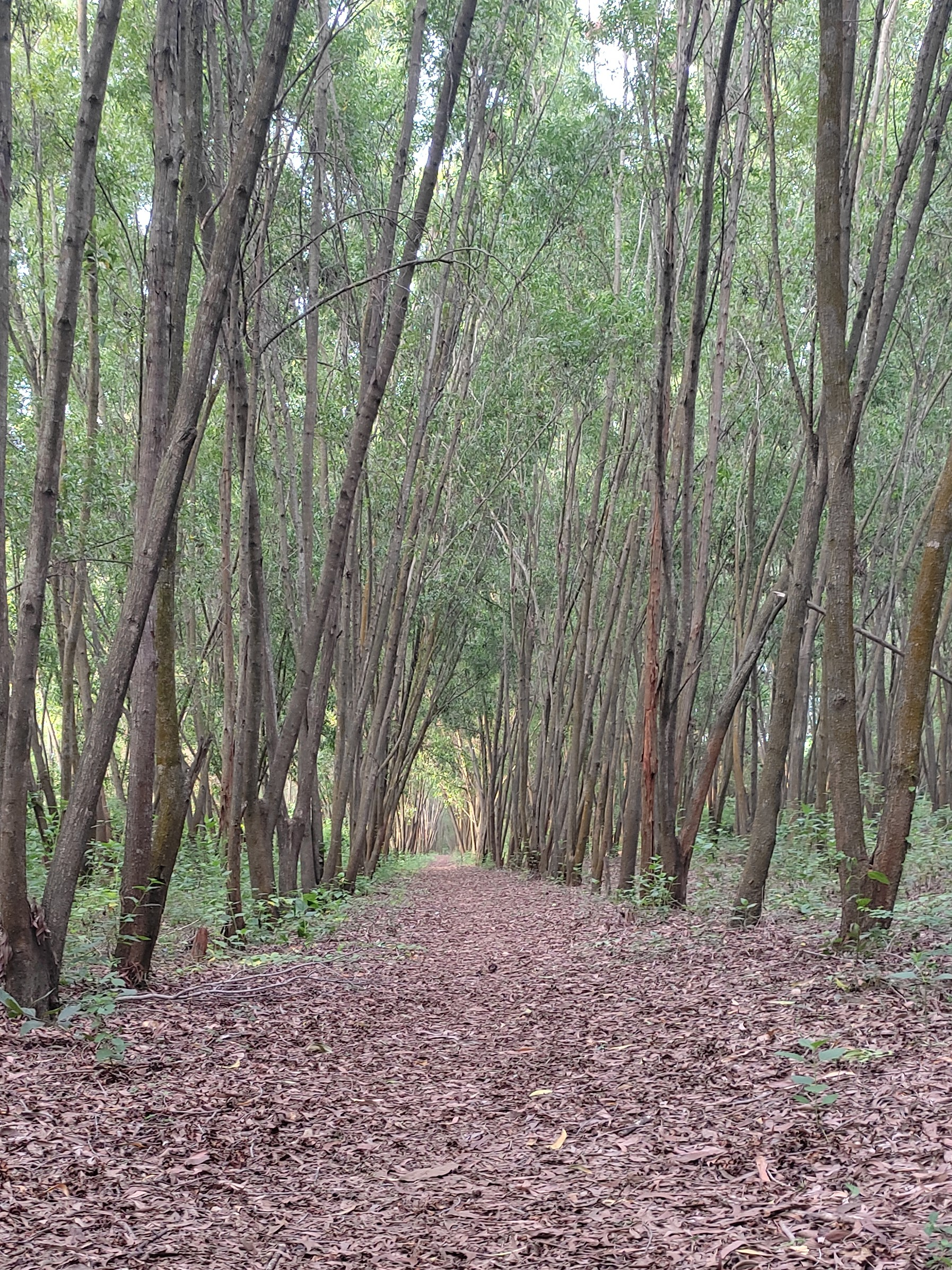
Cycling Trail at Turahalli Forest

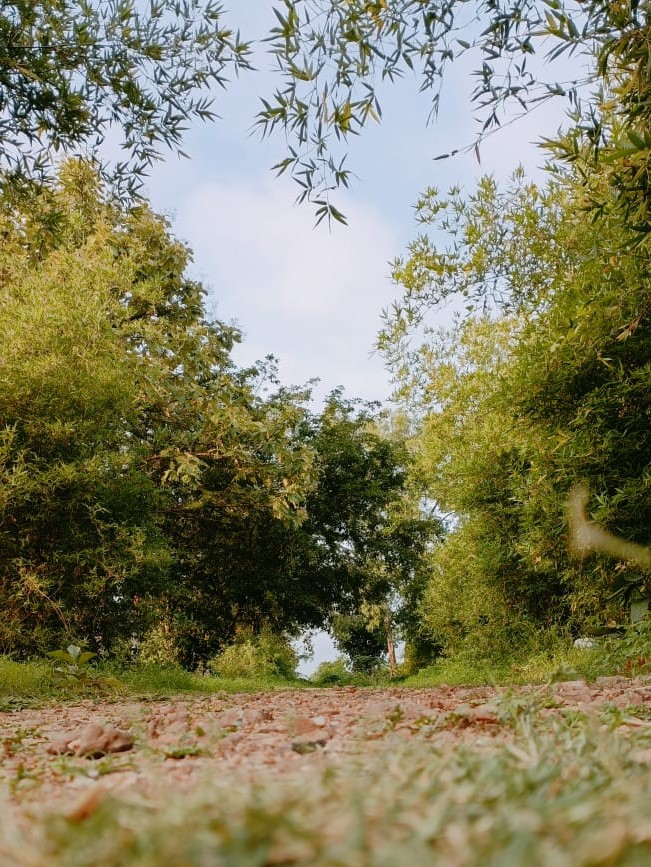
Turahalli forest Cycling Trail

== See also ==
- Tourism in Karnataka
