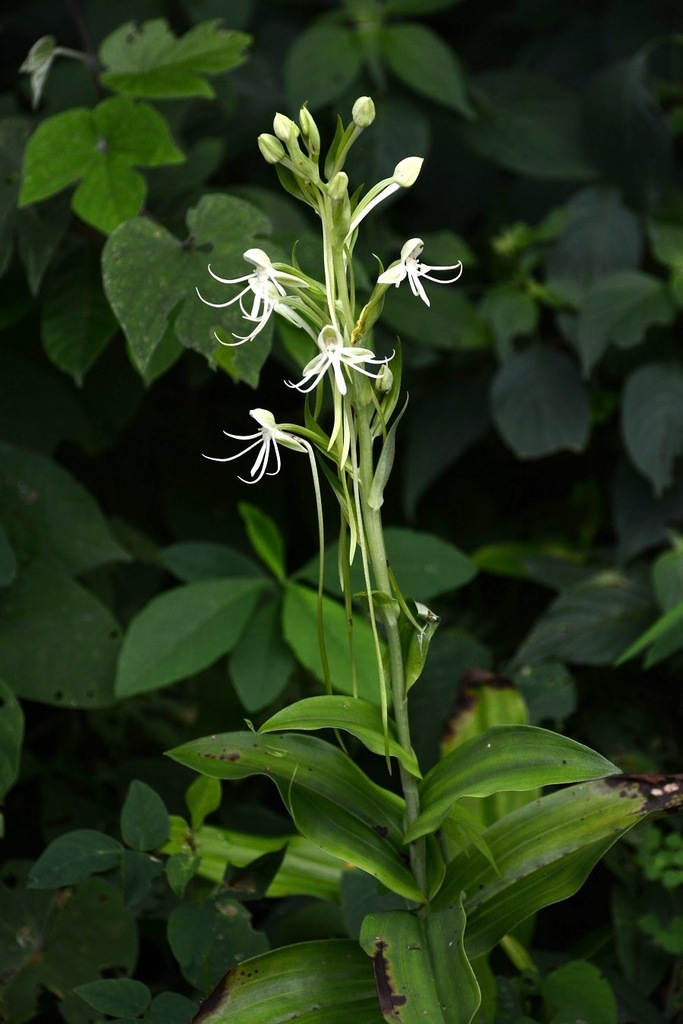

Scientific classification
- Kingdom: Plantae
- Clade: Tracheophytes
- Clade: Angiosperms
- Clade: Monocots
- Order: Asparagales
- Family: Orchidaceae
- Subfamily: Orchidoideae
- Genus: Habenaria
- Species: H. macroceratitis

Binomial name
- Habenaria macroceratitis Willd.

Synonyms
- Orchis habenaria L.; Nemuranthes habenaria (L.) Raf; Habenaria habenaria (L.) Small, invalid; Habenaria quinqueseta var. macroceratitis (Willd.) Luer; Habenaria macroceras Spreng.; Orchis longicornis Sessé & Moc.

= Habenaria macroceratitis =

Species of orchid

Habenaria macroceratitis, the big-horn bog orchid or long-horned false rein orchid, is a species of orchid closely related to H. quinqueseta and often mistaken for it. Habenaria macroceratitis is native to Central America, Mexico, the West Indies (Cuba, Jamaica, Hispaniola), northern South America (Colombia, Venezuela, the Guianas), and Florida.
