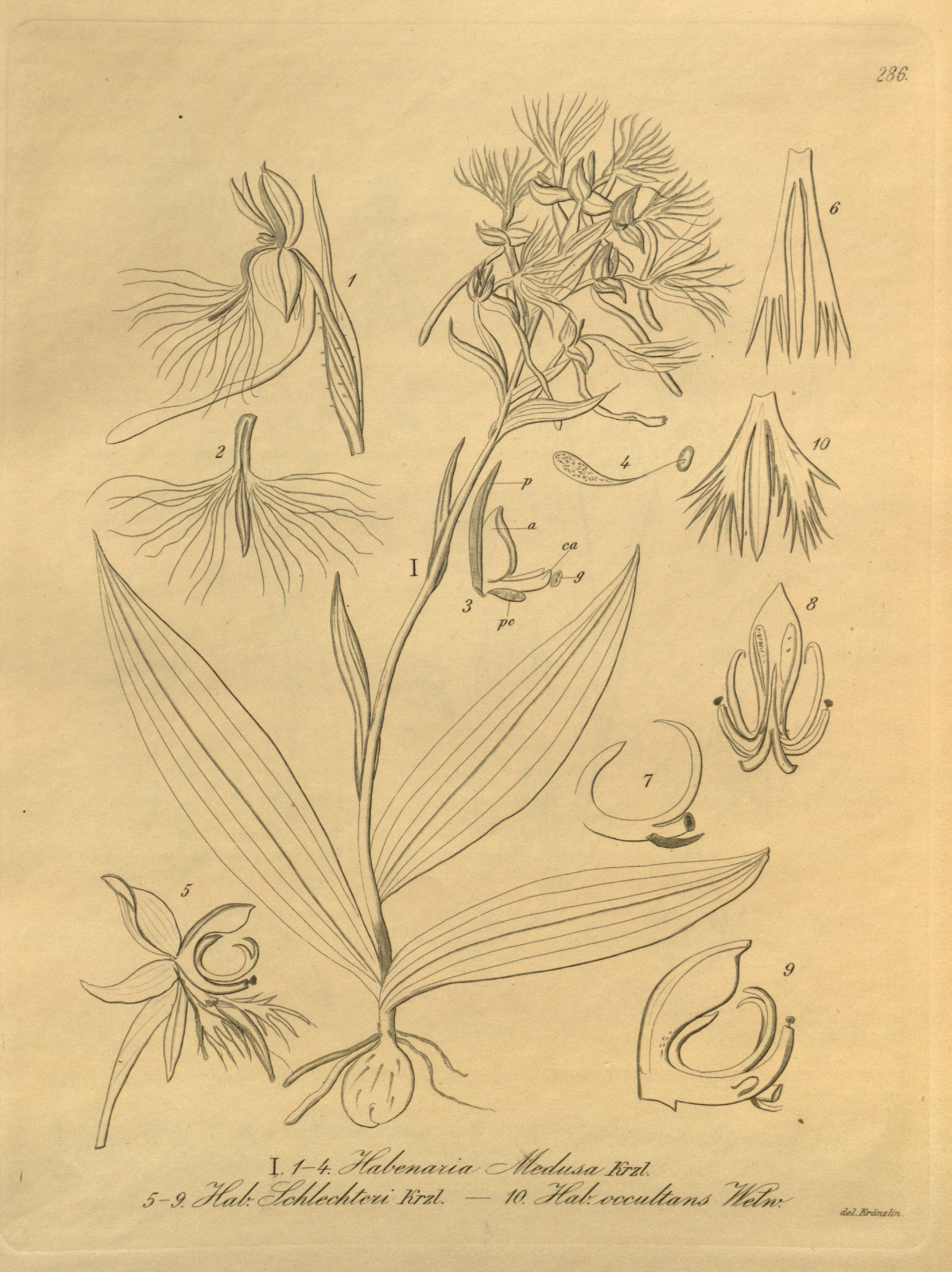
- Centrostigma occultans (with Habenaria medusa)

Scientific classification
- Kingdom: Plantae
- Clade: Tracheophytes
- Clade: Angiosperms
- Clade: Monocots
- Order: Asparagales
- Family: Orchidaceae
- Subfamily: Orchidoideae
- Tribe: Orchideae
- Subtribe: Orchidinae
- Genus: Centrostigma; Schltr.

= Centrostigma =

Genus of flowering plants

Centrostigma is a genus of flowering plants from the orchid family, Orchidaceae. There are three currently accepted species, all native to Africa:

- Centrostigma clavatum Summerh. - Tanzania, Malawi, Zambia, Congo-Kinshasa
- Centrostigma occultans (Welw. ex Rchb.f.) Schltr. - Tanzania, Malawi, Zambia, Congo-Kinshasa, Zimbabwe, Angola, Transvaal
- Centrostigma papillosum Summerh. - Zimbabwe, Angola, Malawi, Zambia

== See also ==
- List of Orchidaceae genera
