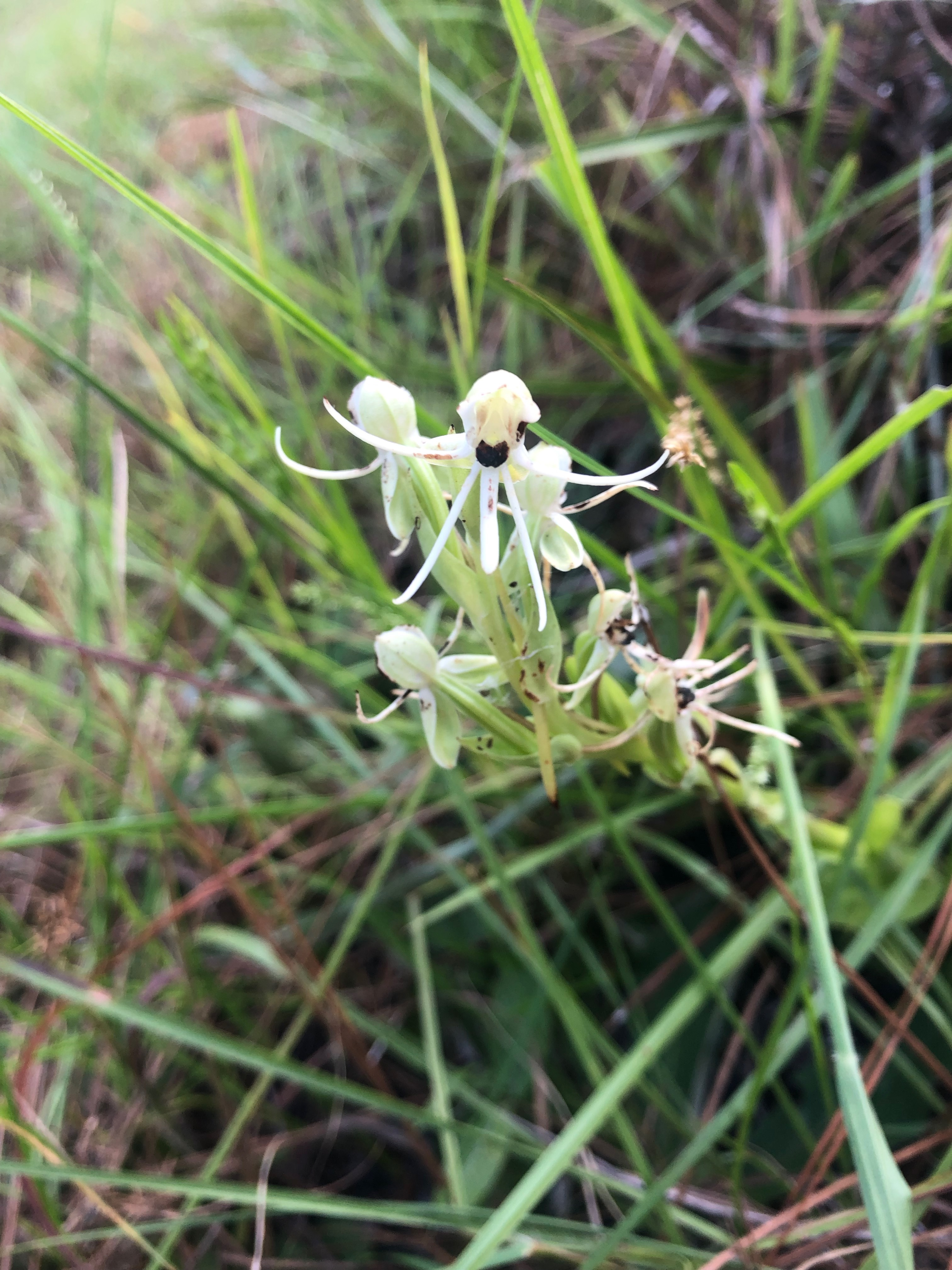

Conservation status
- Apparently Secure (NatureServe)
- CITES Appendix II (CITES)

Scientific classification
- Kingdom: Plantae
- Clade: Tracheophytes
- Clade: Angiosperms
- Clade: Monocots
- Order: Asparagales
- Family: Orchidaceae
- Subfamily: Orchidoideae
- Genus: Habenaria
- Species: H. quinqueseta

Binomial name
- Habenaria quinqueseta (Michx.) Eaton

Synonyms
- Orchis quinqueseta Michx.; Habenaria michauxii Nutt.; Mesicera quinqueseta (Michx.) Raf.; Mesicera michauxii (Nutt.) Raf.; Platanthera michauxii (Nutt.) Alph.Wood; Orchis michauxii (Nutt.) Alph.Wood; Habenaria simpsonii Small; Habenaria macroceratitis var. brevicalcarata Ames

= Habenaria quinqueseta =

Longhorn bog orchid

Species of orchid

Habenaria quinqueseta, commonly known as the longhorn bog orchid, is a species of orchid closely related to H. macroceratitis and often mistaken for it. It is native to the southern United States, Mexico, Central America, the West Indies, and northern South America.

== Distribution and habitat ==
Habenaria quinqueseta has a widespread distribution from southern North America through to Central America and the West Indies, with the southernmost part of its range in northern South America. In North America it is known from the southern United States (Alabama, Florida, Georgia, Louisiana, Mississippi, South Carolina, and Texas) and Mexico. In Central America it is known from Costa Rica, El Salvador, Guatemala, Honduras, Nicaragua, and Panama. In the West Indies it is known from the Bahamas, Cuba, the Dominican Republic, Haiti, and Jamaica. In South America it is known from Colombia, French Guiana, Guyana, Suriname, and Venezuela, never reaching as far south as Brazil.

In the southern United States, this species inhabits flatwoods, hammocks, meadows, swamps and roadside areas at elevations up to 100 m (330 ft).
