= Seshachalam Hills =

Part of the Eastern Ghats in Andhra Pradesh, India

Coordinates: 14.33333°N 78.25°E

Seshachalam Hills are hilly ranges part of the Eastern Ghats in Andhra Pradesh state, southeastern India. The Seshachalam hill ranges are predominantly present in Tirupati district of the Rayalaseema region in Andhra Pradesh.

== Geology ==
The ranges were formed during the Precambrian supereon (3.8 billion to 539 million years ago). Minerals contained in these hills include sandstone and shale interbedded with limestone. The ranges are bounded by the Rayalaseema uplands to the west and northwest, and the Nandyal Valley to the north.

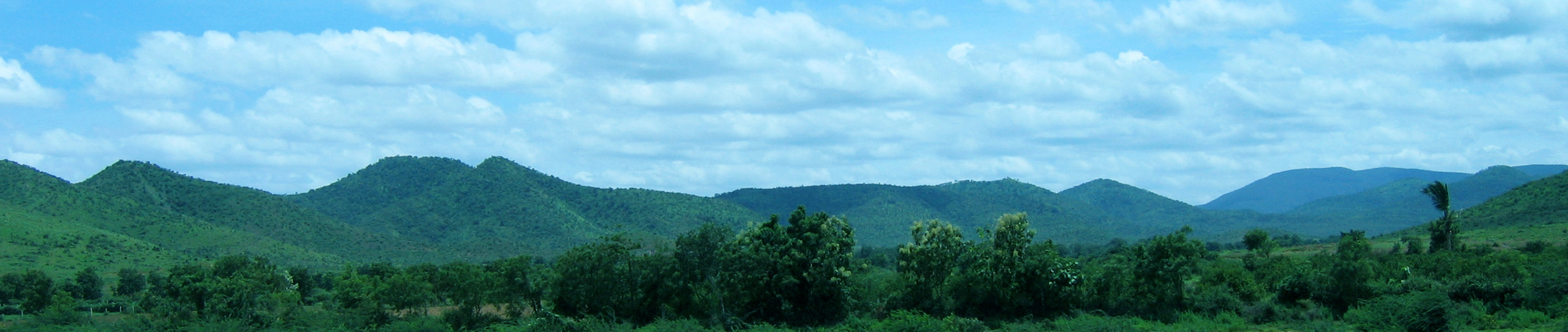
Seshachalam Hill Range – panoramic view, Talakona.

== Religious significance ==
Tirumala, a major Hindu pilgrimage town near the city of Tirupati is located on the hills. The hills contain seven peaks namely, Anjanadri, Garudadri, Narayanadri, Neeladri, Seshadri, Venkatadri and Vrishabhadri, the highest at about 1000 m (3,300 ft) above sea level. The seven peaks are said to represent the seven hoods of Shesha, the king of the serpents in Hindu mythology. The Sri Venkateswara National Park is also located in these ranges. The famous Natural Arch, Tirumala Hills is also a part of Seshachalam Hills, which dates back to the period in between Middle and Upper Proterozoic Eon.

The Seshachalam hill ranges run North West to South East, to a length about 80 km and width ranging from 32 to 40 km in the Rayalaseema district, Tirupati. These ranges have typical gorges and gaps due to faulting and stream erosion resulting in discontinuous ranges. The altitude of Seshachalam hill ranges varies from 168 to 1187 m above MSL. The highest hill summit is Tellaralla penta (1187 m) and most of the other hill peaks are above 900 m MSL.

== Protected reserve forest ==
In 2010, it was designated as a Biosphere Reserve. It has large reserves of red sandalwood which is used in medicines, soaps, religious rituals, etc.

== Gallery ==
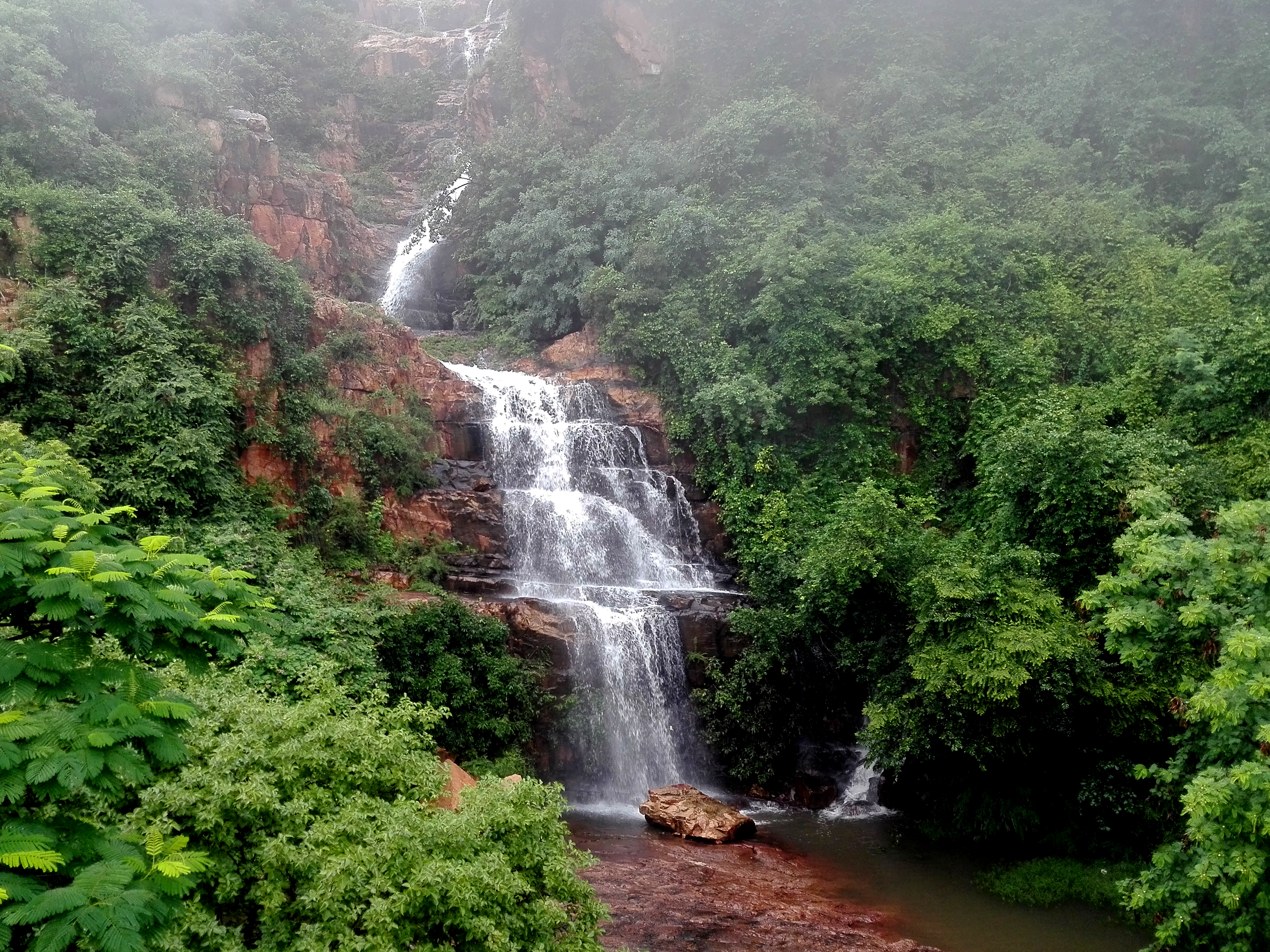
Malwadi Gundam waterfalls on Tirumala hills

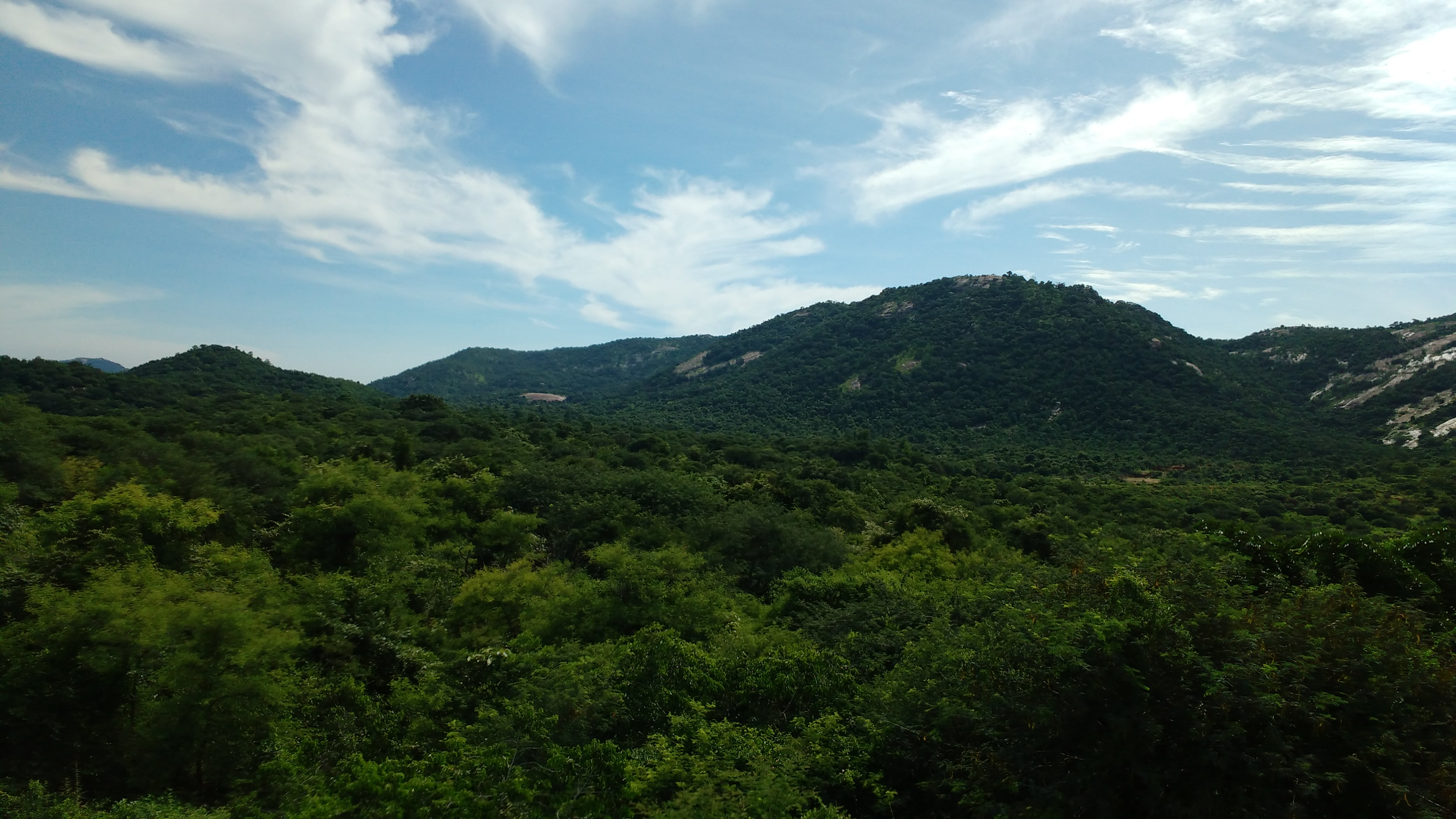
A scenic view of Seshachalam Hills

== In popular culture ==
- Pushpa: The Rise, a 2021 Indian film is about illegal logging in the Seshachalam Hills region
