= Nerabailu =

- village
- Interactive map of Nerabailu
- Location in Andhra Pradesh, India
- Coordinates: 13°44′58″N 79°09′48″E
- Country: India
- State: Andhra Pradesh
- District: Tirupati
- Mandal: Yerravaripalem

Population (2011)
  - Total: 4,253

Languages
  - Official: Telugu
- Time zone: UTC+5:30 (IST)
- PIN: 517194
- Telephone code: 08584
- Vehicle registration: AP

Nerabailu is a village in Yerravaripalem Mandal of Tirupati district.

== Demographics ==
Population (2011) - Total 4,253 - males 2,191 -females 2,062 - No. houses. 1,297 Population (2001) - Total 3,796 - males 1,912 - females 1,884 - No. of houses. 1,050

== Tourism ==
Near by tourist spots Talakona, Nallamalla forest, Tirupati.
