= Sri Venkateswara National Park =

National park in Andhra Pradesh, India

- IUCN category II (national park)
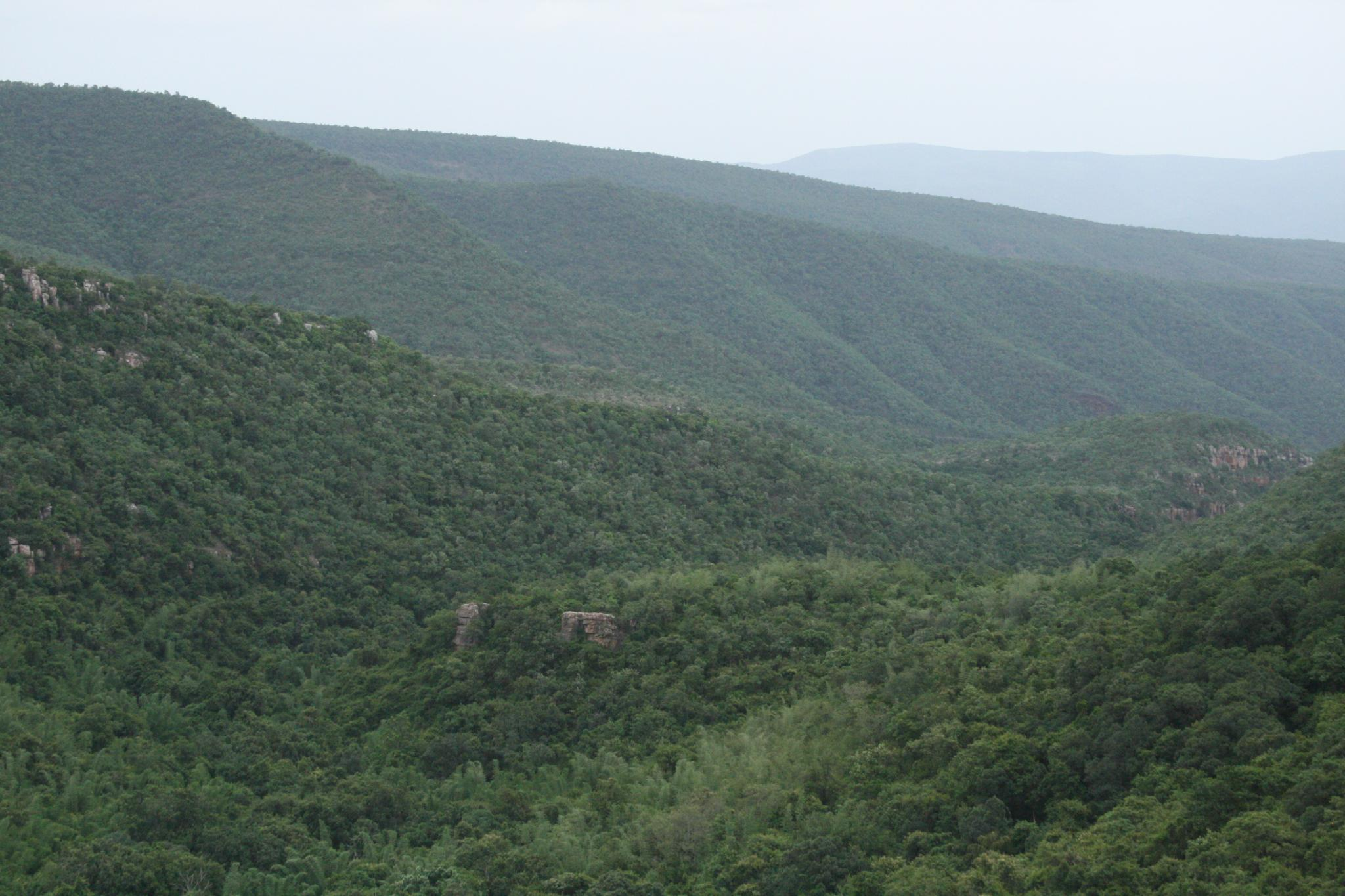
- Sri Venkateswara National Park on Tirumala Hills

- Location within Andhra Pradesh Location within India
- Interactive map of Sri Venkateswara National Park
- Location: Tirupati district, Andhra Pradesh, India
- Nearest city: Tirupati
- Coordinates: 13°45′4″N 79°20′16″E
- Area: 353 km^{2} (136 sq mi)
- Established: September 1989

Sri Venkateswara National Park is a national park and biosphere reserve in Tirupati in Andhra Pradesh, India. The total area of the park is 353 km^{2} (136 sq mi). The park is known for its many waterfalls, including the Talakona, Gundalakona and Gunjana. As the Government of India declared the Seshachalam Hills as one of the biosphere reserves of India in 2010, this national park became the part of it.

== Geography ==
The National Park is located in the Eastern Ghats spread over the Seshachalam hills of Tirupati district. The elevation varies from 150 to 1,130 m (490 to 3,710 ft). The terrain is undulating with forest covered valleys. Most of the rainfall is received from the northeast monsoon and a little from the southwest monsoon. The vegetation here is a mix of dry deciduous and moist deciduous types.

Average rainfall in the region is 900 mm (35 in). The average temperature of the region varies from 12 to 44 °C (54 to 111 °F).

== Flora and fauna ==
=== Flora ===
The vegetation in the national park consists of dry deciduous mixed forest with areas of moist deciduous forests in the valleys. The area has about 1,500 vascular plant species belonging to 174 families, of which several are endemic. Some of the rare and endemic plant species like red sanders, Shorea talura, Shorea tumbugaia, Terminalia pallida, sandalwood, Cycas beddomei, Syzygium alternifolium and Psilotum nudum occur in this region.

=== Fauna ===
About 178 species of birds from this national park have been identified. The globally threatened yellow-throated bulbul is seen here. grey-fronted green pigeon, a bird of the Himalayas and the Western Ghats is quite common in these forests. The critically endangered Oriental white-backed vulture is found in the national park. Some of the other birds found here are: large hawk-cuckoo, blue-faced malkoha, yellow-browed bulbul, Indian scimitar-babbler and Loten's sunbird.

In 1984 the Asian elephant, not seen in Andhra Pradesh for nearly 300 years, re-appeared in the southern part of Chittoor district. In 1993, a breakaway herd of five individuals moved to the Chamala Valley of Tirumala forests in this national park.

Among predators the leopard is quite common, along with the wild dog. Other predators include golden jackal, Indian fox, small Indian civet and jungle cat. Sloth bear is frequently encountered. Sambar, spotted deer, mouse deer, barking deer, four-horned antelope and wild boar are the main ungulates. The nocturnal slender loris could be common but is seldom seen. The Indian giant squirrel and tree shrew are other interesting species.

Among reptiles, the most interesting species is the gliding lizard, found in some deep forested valleys. Another important reptile of this national park is the Indian golden gecko. Originally reported from rocky ravines in the Eastern Ghats, the Indian golden gecko was rediscovered from the same area in 1985

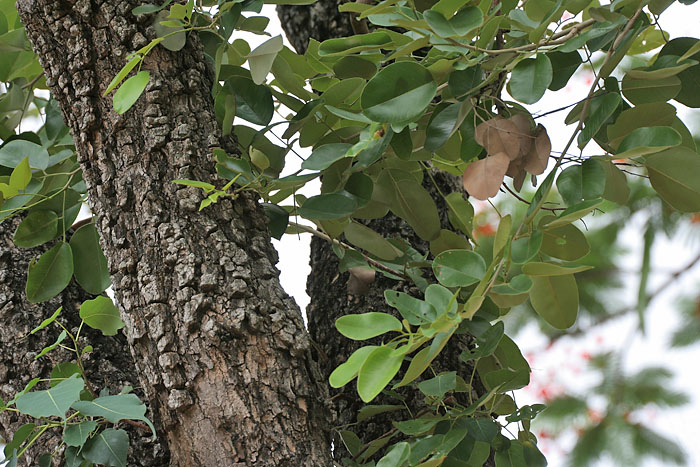
Pterocarpus santalinus (red sandalwood) in Talakona forests of Sri Venkateswara National Park

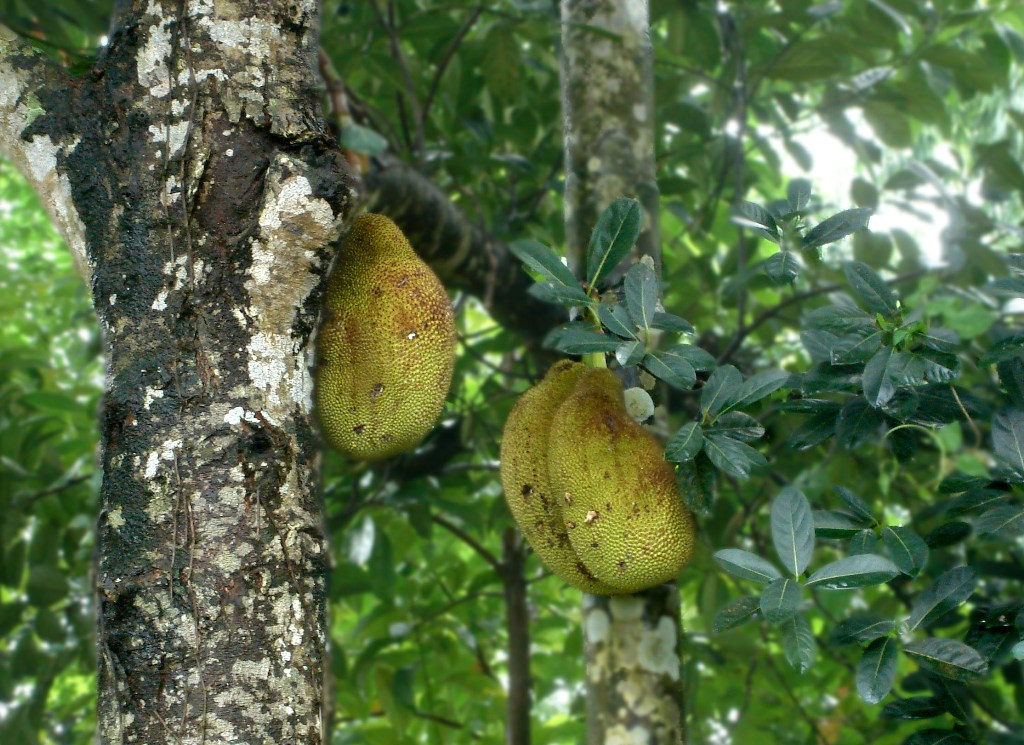
Artocarpus heterophyllus (jack fruit) at Sri Venkateswara National Park

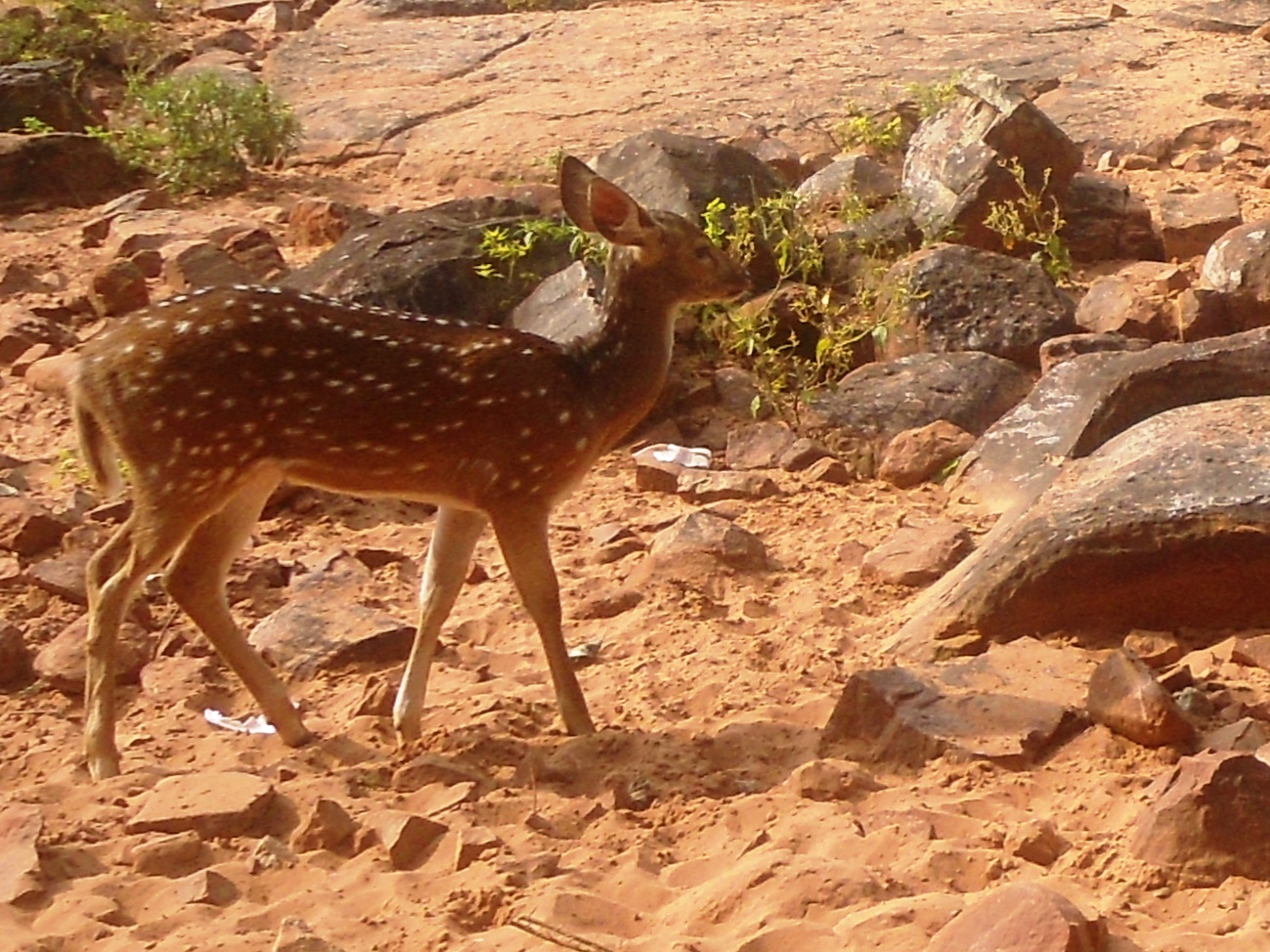
Axis axis (spotted deer) at deerpark on Tirumala hills in Sri Venkateswara National Park

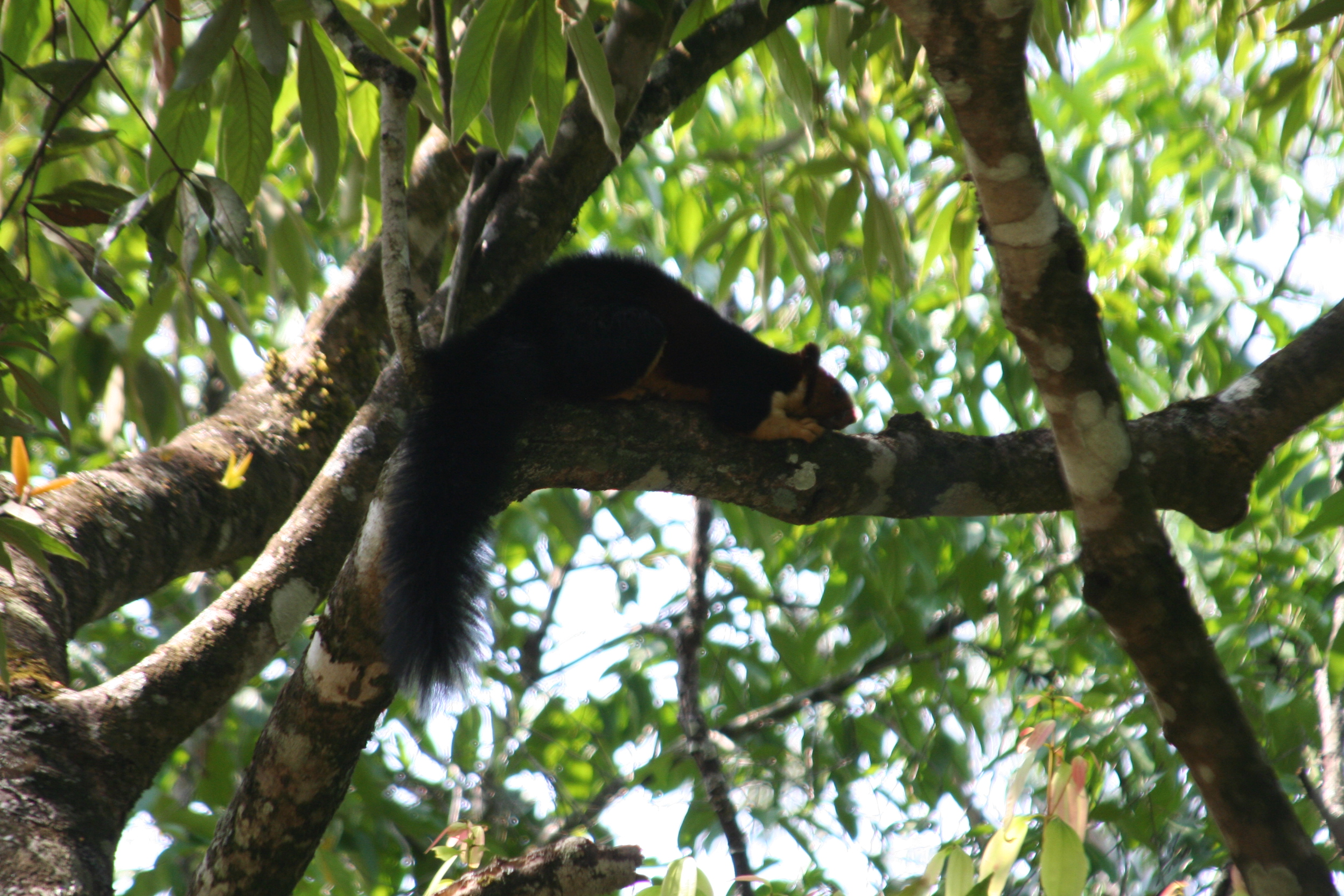
Ratufa indica (Indian giant squirrel) at Sri Venkateswara National Park

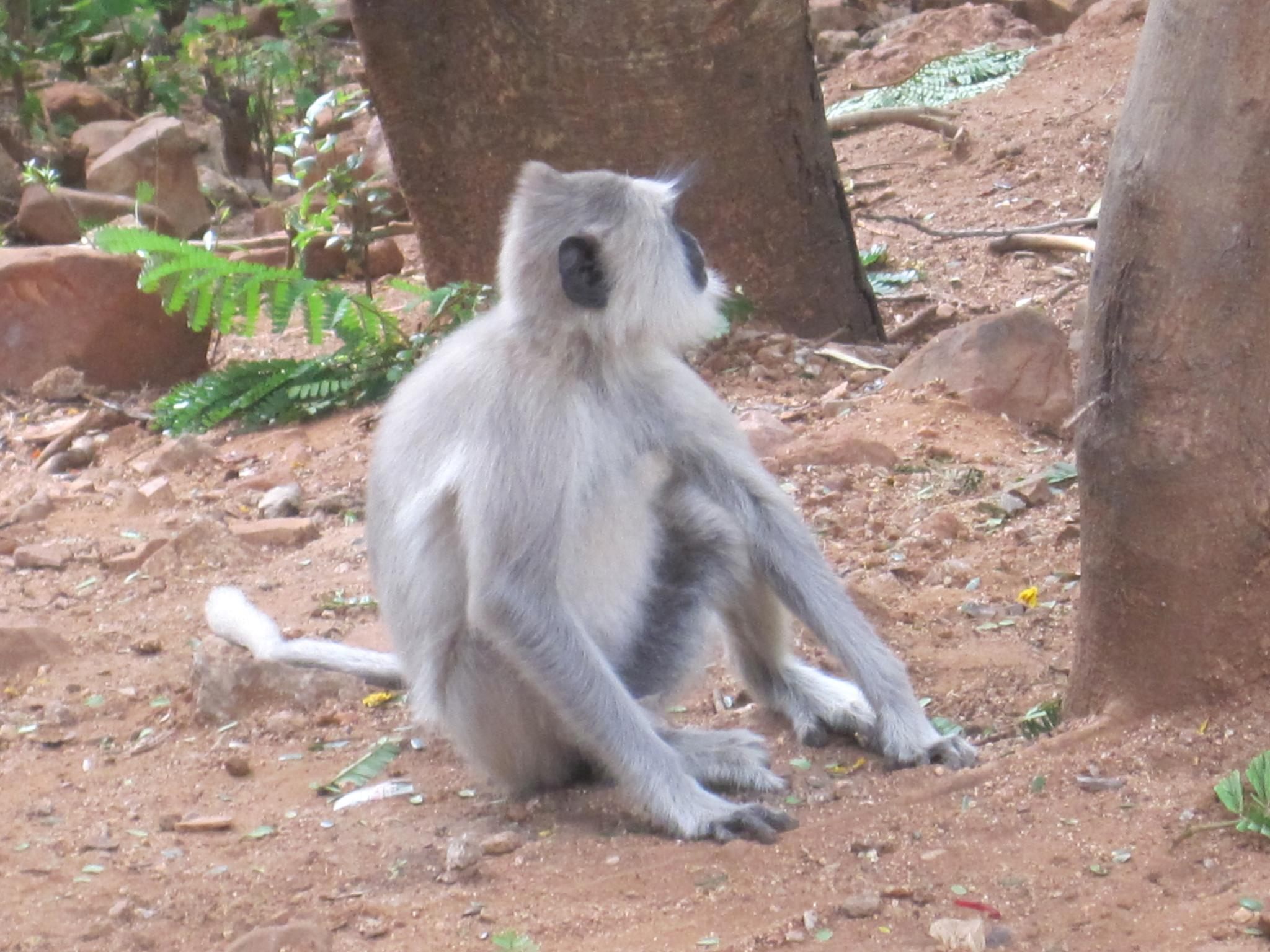
Semnopithecus priam (gray langur) at Sri Venkateswara National Park

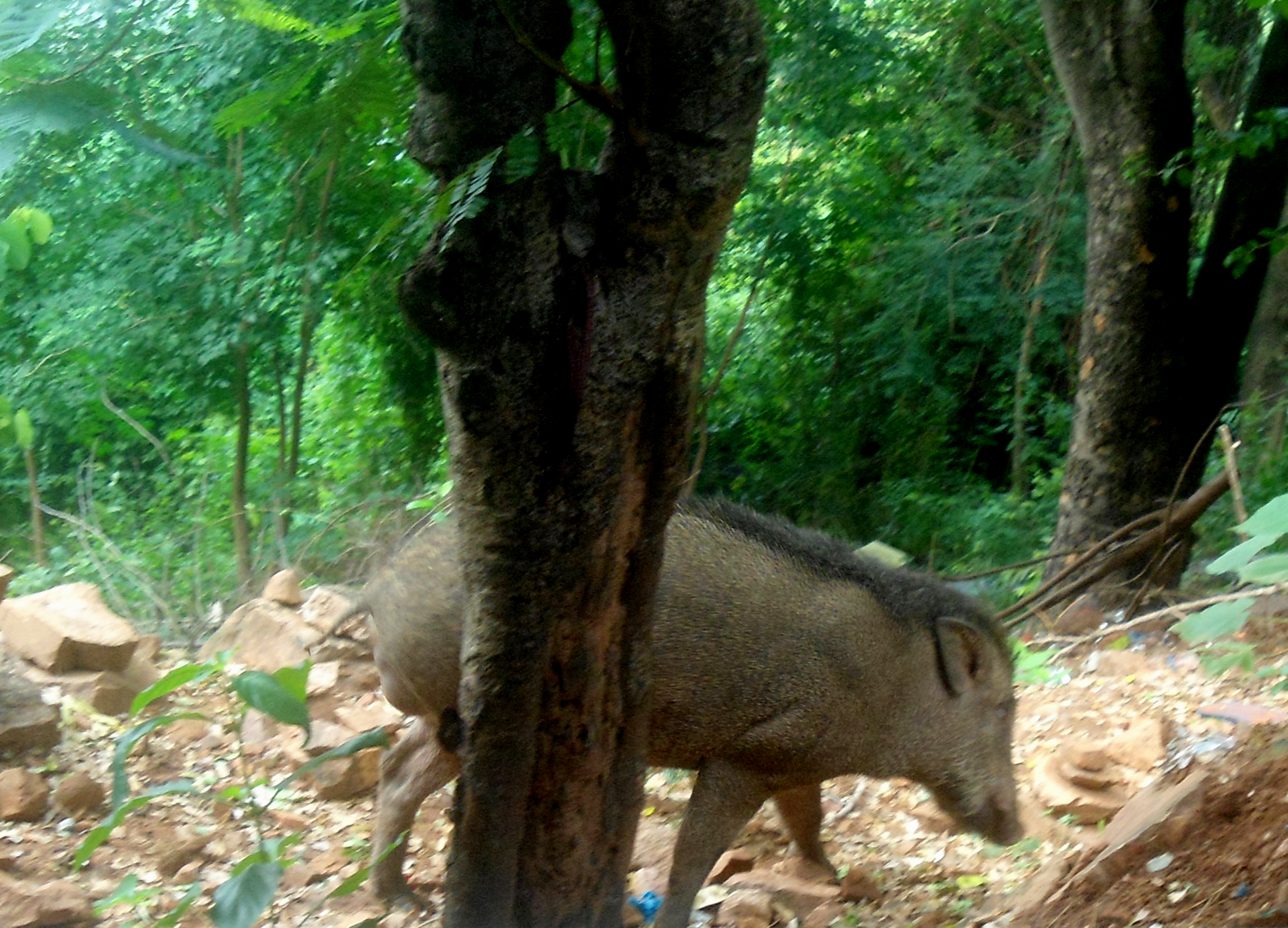
Sus scrofa (wild boar) at Sri Venkateswara National Park

== Threats ==
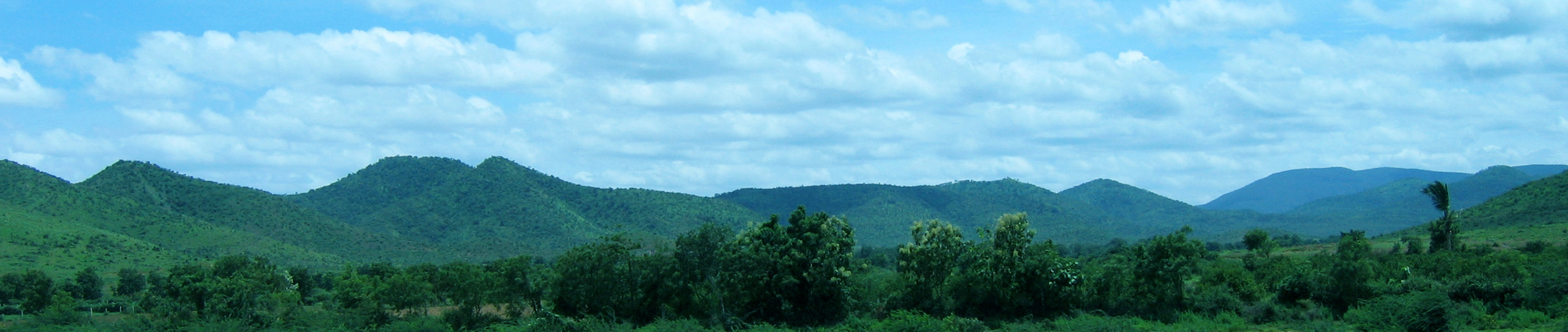
Panoramic view of Sri Venkateswara National Park along the Eastern Ghats near Talakona, Andhra Pradesh

The key threats the national park are construction and quarrying. The Andhra Pradesh State Highway Project, is undertaking the upgrade of highways in the state of Andhra Pradesh, and this includes construction of Warangal-Pollacolu road, which passes close to the western boundary of the national park. Another construction is of the Kapil Teertham Dam inside the national park by the Andhra Pradesh Government and the Tirumala Tirupati Devasthanam. Both these construction projects raise concerns over the potential impact of the road and the dam on the habitat and the wildlife in the sanctuary. Regular forest fires are also a constant threat to the biodiversity and ecological balance in the park.
