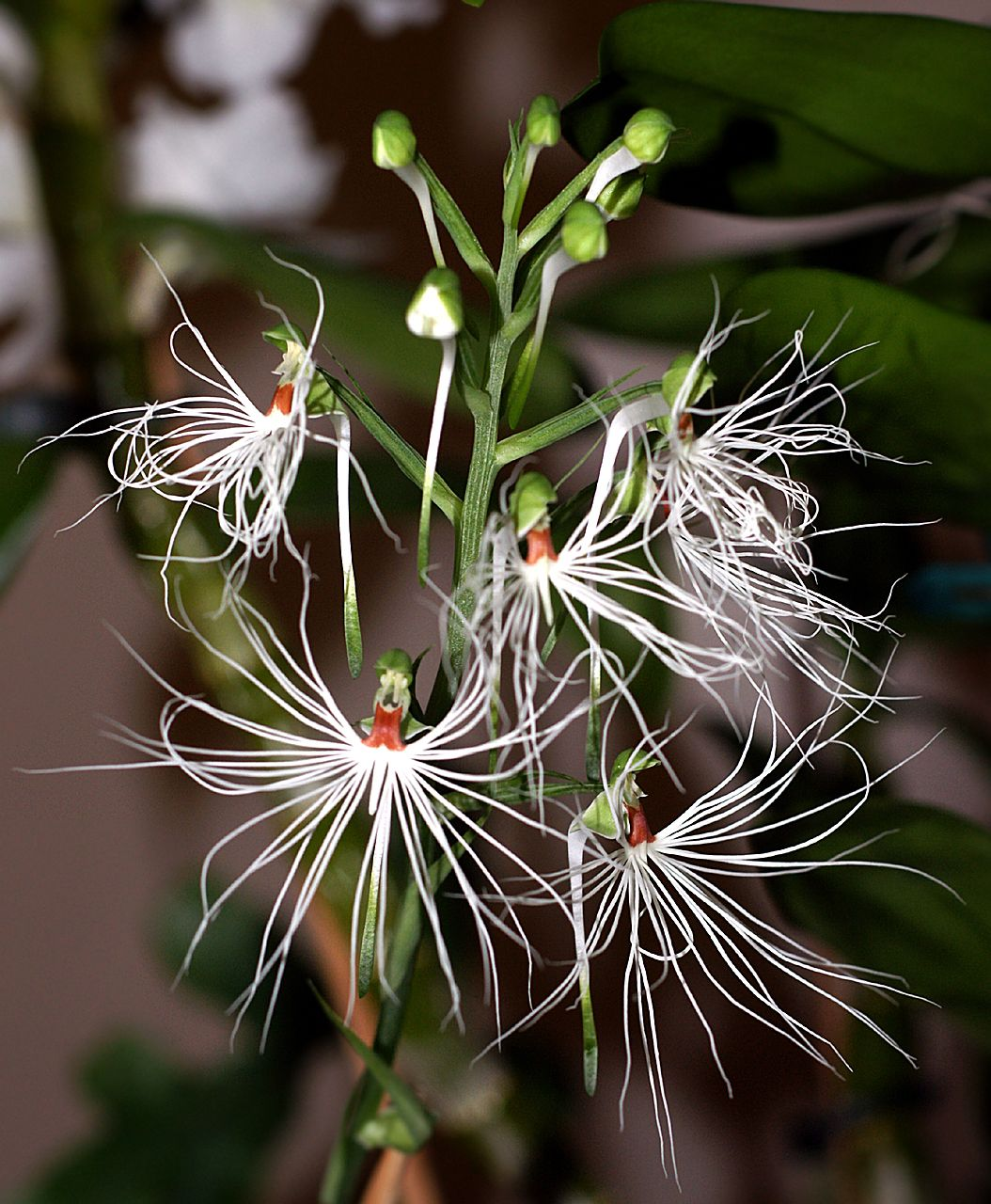

Scientific classification
- Kingdom: Plantae
- Clade: Tracheophytes
- Clade: Angiosperms
- Clade: Monocots
- Order: Asparagales
- Family: Orchidaceae
- Subfamily: Orchidoideae
- Genus: Habenaria
- Species: H. medusa

Binomial name
- Habenaria medusa Kraenzl.

Synonyms
- Fimbrorchis medusa (Kraenzl.) Szlach.; Pecteilis medusa (Kraenzl.) M.A.Clem. & D.L.Jones

= Habenaria medusa =

Species of orchid

Habenaria medusa is a species of orchid endemic to Java, Sumatra, Sulawesi and Borneo.
