= Siddheshwar, Raigad =

Village in Maharashtra

Coordinates: 18°35′03″N 73°16′48″E

Siddheshwar is a small village in Raigad district, Maharashtra, India. It sits on primarily agricultural and forest land, and residents mostly work in agrarian jobs. Modern amenities are scarce.

Siddheshwar has several Hindu temples, including Bapooji Temple, which honors the village god.
