= Siddheshwar Mandir, Palari =

Coordinates: 21°32′05″N 82°10′40″E

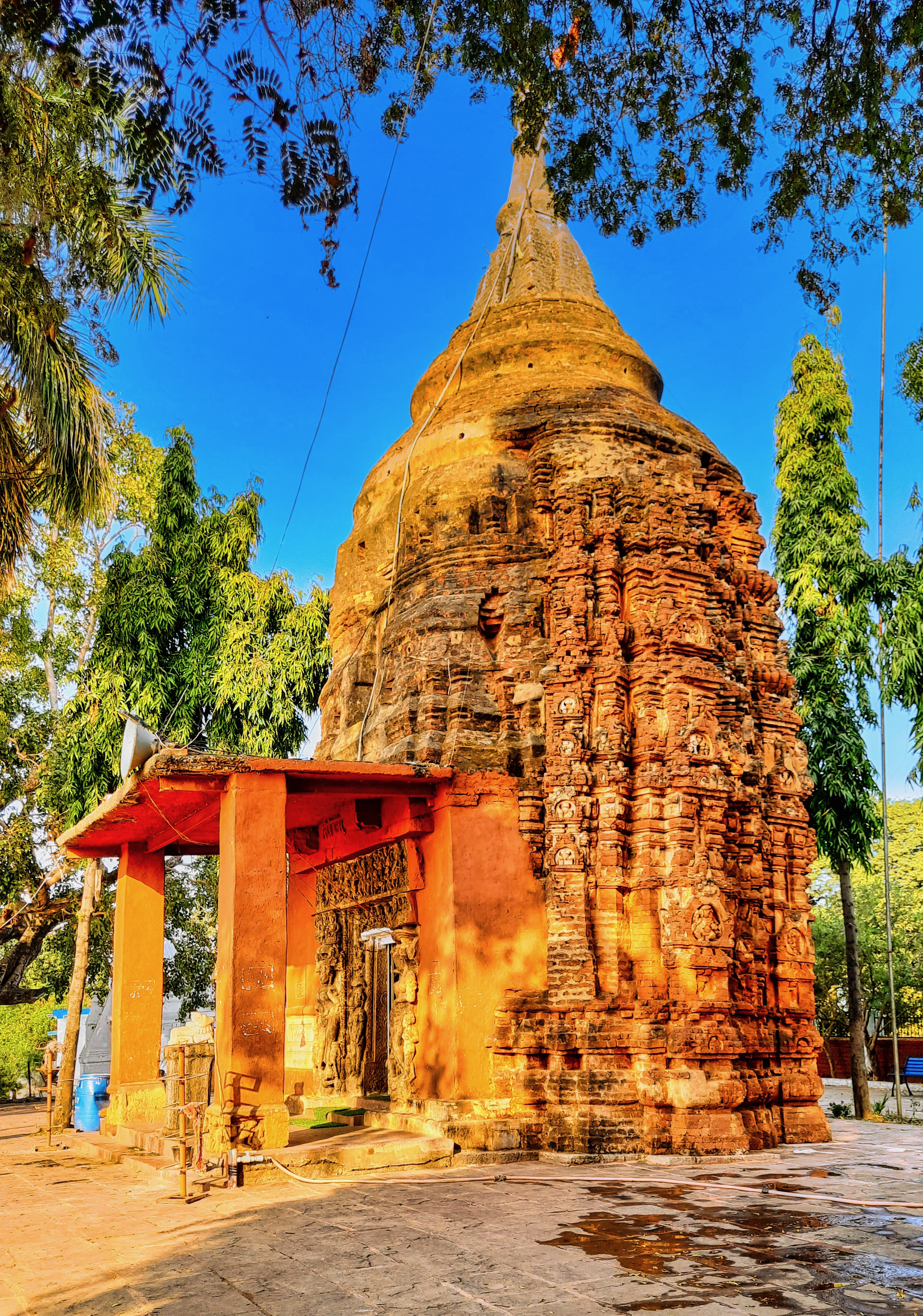

Religion
- Affiliation: Hinduism
- Deity: Shiva

Siddheshwar Temple is a temple located in Palari, in the Indian state of Chhattisgarh.

== History ==
From the style of its architecture, it is inferred that this temple was constructed about fifty years after the Lakshmana Temple at Sirpur, which is dated 595–605. This would put the approximate date of its construction in the middle of the seventh century CE.

== Description ==
The west-facing temple has a stellate plan, and is located within a courtyard. It is built entirely out of brick, except for the doorway and a new porch, which are built of stone.

=== Entrance ===
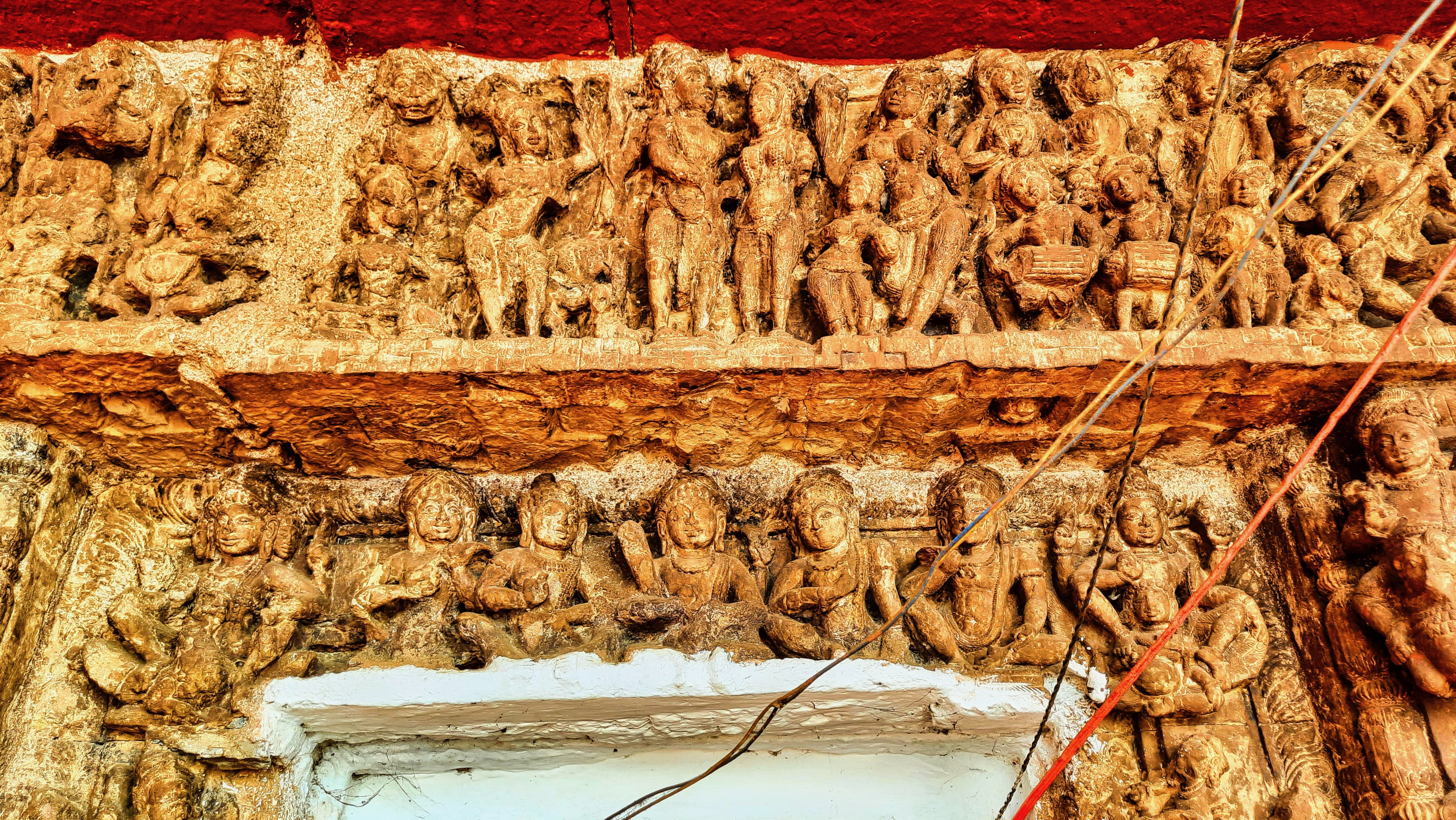
The upper frieze depicts the wedding of Shiva and Parvati. Below it is the lintel of the entrance, with Brahma and Vishnu at the corners, and Lakulisha with his four disciples in the center.

The doorway is elaborately carved, and its organization as well as placement of the deities is influenced by the earlier Indal Deul temple. It is flanked by life-sized sculptures of Ganga and Yamuna on the left and right respectively. Above these river deities are depictions of the "guardians of the directions" or Ashtadikpalas—Vayu, Nirṛta, and Varuna are located above the image of Ganga, while Kubera, Ishana, and Agni are above Yamuna. On the left jamb is Indra along with his consort, seated upon Airavata.

On its lintel, in the center is a four-armed depiction of Lakulisha, surrounded by his four traditional disciples; Kushika and Garga on the left, and Mitra and Kaurushya on the right. Towards the left of the disciples is a representation of Brahma seated upon Hamsa. Corresponding to this, on the right, is Vishnu seated upon Garuda. The lintel is at the same level as the carved guardians of the directions. Above this level is a long frieze, which depicts three Shaivite scenes. The center of the frieze, above the lintel, depicts the wedding of Shiva and Parvati, being witnessed by various attendants and musicians. To the left is Shiva slaying an elephant-demon, and to the right is Shiva in combat with the demon Andhaka.

=== Shikhara ===
The temple tower is adorned with gavakshas, each being crowned with a lion.

=== Pillars ===
The entrance to the courtyard has two pillars, upon one of which is a life-sized male figure. These were probably a part of a mandapa, with at least four pillars (the two pillars would have a matching counterpart each). The placement of life-sized sculptures on pillars is first seen here. It is an adaptation of a long-standing tradition of such sculptures on the pilasters of temples, as seen in the Sirpur and in the Rajiv Lochan temple.
