= Siddheswara Swamy Temple =

Hindu temple in India

Coordinates: 13.8147°N 79.1963°E

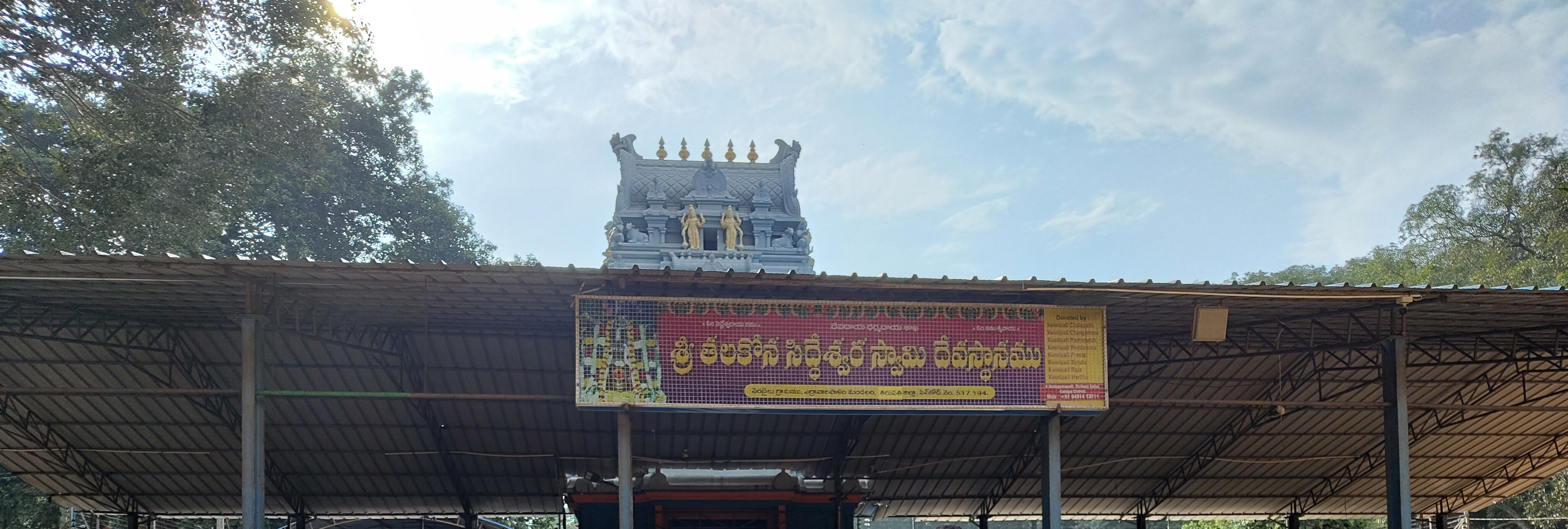

Religion
- Affiliation: Hinduism
- District: Tirupati district
- Deity: Lord Shiva

Location
- Location: Talakona
- State: Andhra Pradesh
- Country: India

Siddheswara Swamy Temple is a large Hindu temple located in the Indian state of Andhra Pradesh. It is located in Talakona in the Sri Venkateswara National Park of Tirupati district. The temple is located in the deep forest of the park (just 20 minutes walk from the well-known Talakona Waterfall). The main deity of the temple is Shiva and the primary festival celebrated is Maha Shivaratri. Locals also gather to celebrate Holi.
