= Talakona =

Resort in Andhra Pradesh, India

Coordinates: 13°48′42″N 79°12′56″E

Talakona is situated in Tirupati district of Andhra Pradesh, India. It is a resort with waterfalls, dense forests and wildlife. Talakona waterfall is in Sri Venkateswara National Park, Tirupati district of Andhra Pradesh. With a 270 feet (82 m)-fall, Talakona is the highest waterfall in Andhra Pradesh state. Talakona is also known for the Lord Siddheswara Swamy Temple, which is located close to the waterfall.

== Location ==
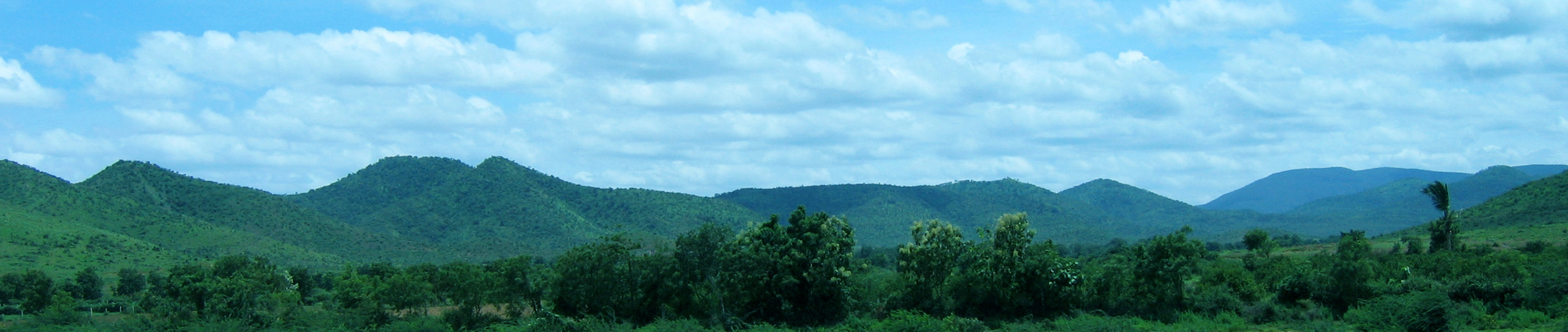
Panoramic view of Sri Venkateswara National Park along the Eastern Ghats near Talakona

Talakona is located in Nerabailu village in Yerravaripalem Mandal of Tirupati district. It is located 49 kilometres (30 mi) from Pileru, 58 kilometres (36 mi) from Tirupati, 67.9 kilometres (42.2 mi) from Chittoor, 127 kilometres (79 mi) from Vellore, 220 kilometres (140 mi) from Chennai, and 105 kilometres (65 mi) from Chittoor and 250 kilometres (160 mi) from Bangalore.

Talakona is a resort with waterfalls, dense forests and wildlife. The area was declared a biosphere reserve in 1989 due to the presence of rich variety of flora and fauna.

== Etymology ==
Talakona means head hill in Telugu (tala - head and kona - hill). However, Thalakona allegorically means "the head of the Seshachalam hills" as these mountains are believed to be the starting point of the Tirumala mountain ranges.

== Flora and fauna ==
The Talakona forests host rare and endangered species of animals like Slender Loris, Indian Giant Squirrel, Mouse Deer, Golden Gecko, Panther, Porcupine, Chital and Sambar. Endemic species like Red Sander, Cycas beddomeii and Enteda like giant plants are also found in this region. The forest is mostly covered with sandalwood trees with some medicinal plants.

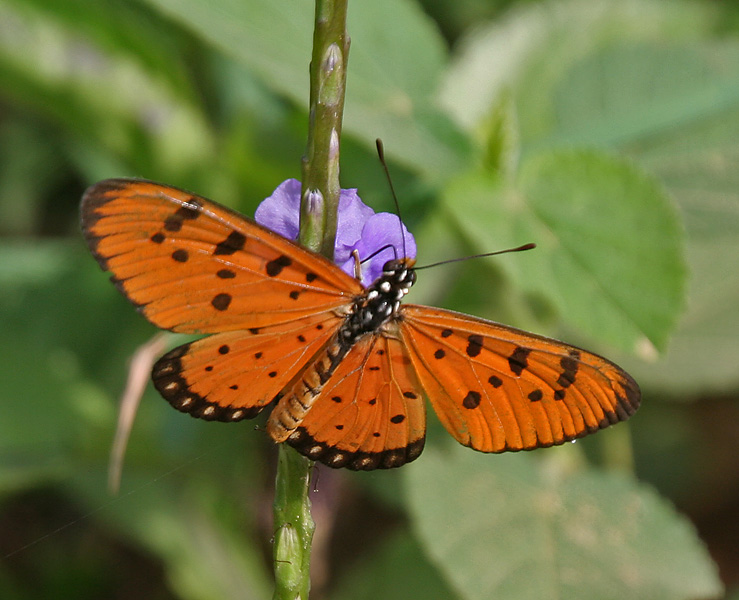
Tawny Coster (Acraea violae) on Stachytarpheta jamaicensis (Porterweed) in Talakona forest

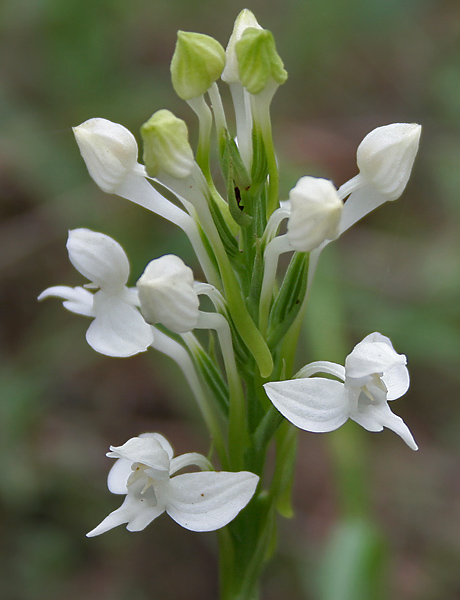
Orchid- Habenaria roxburghii in Talakona forest, in Chittoor District of Andhra Pradesh, India

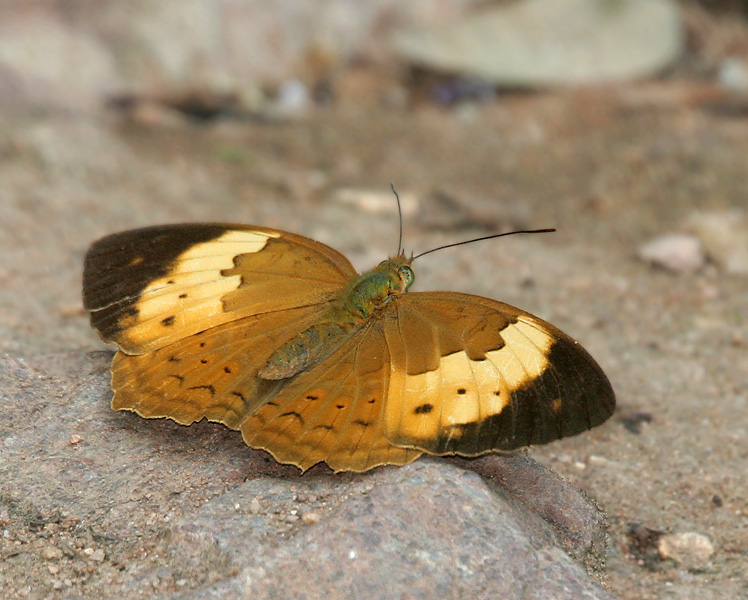
Rustic Butterfly in Talakona forest, in Chittoor District of Andhra Pradesh, India

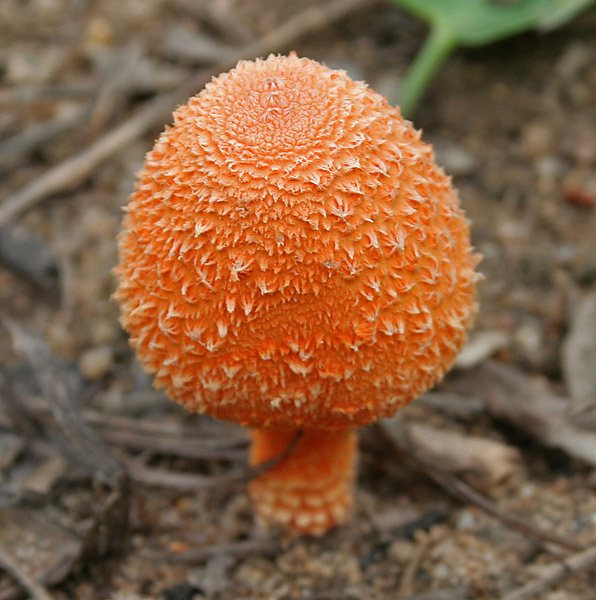
Mushroom in Talakona forest

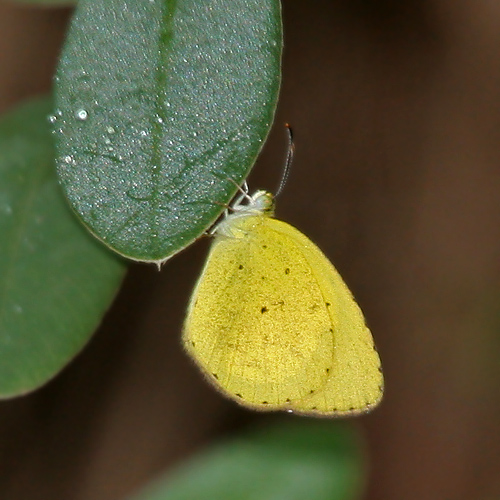
Small Grass Yellow (Eurema brigitta) in Talakona forest

== Tourism ==
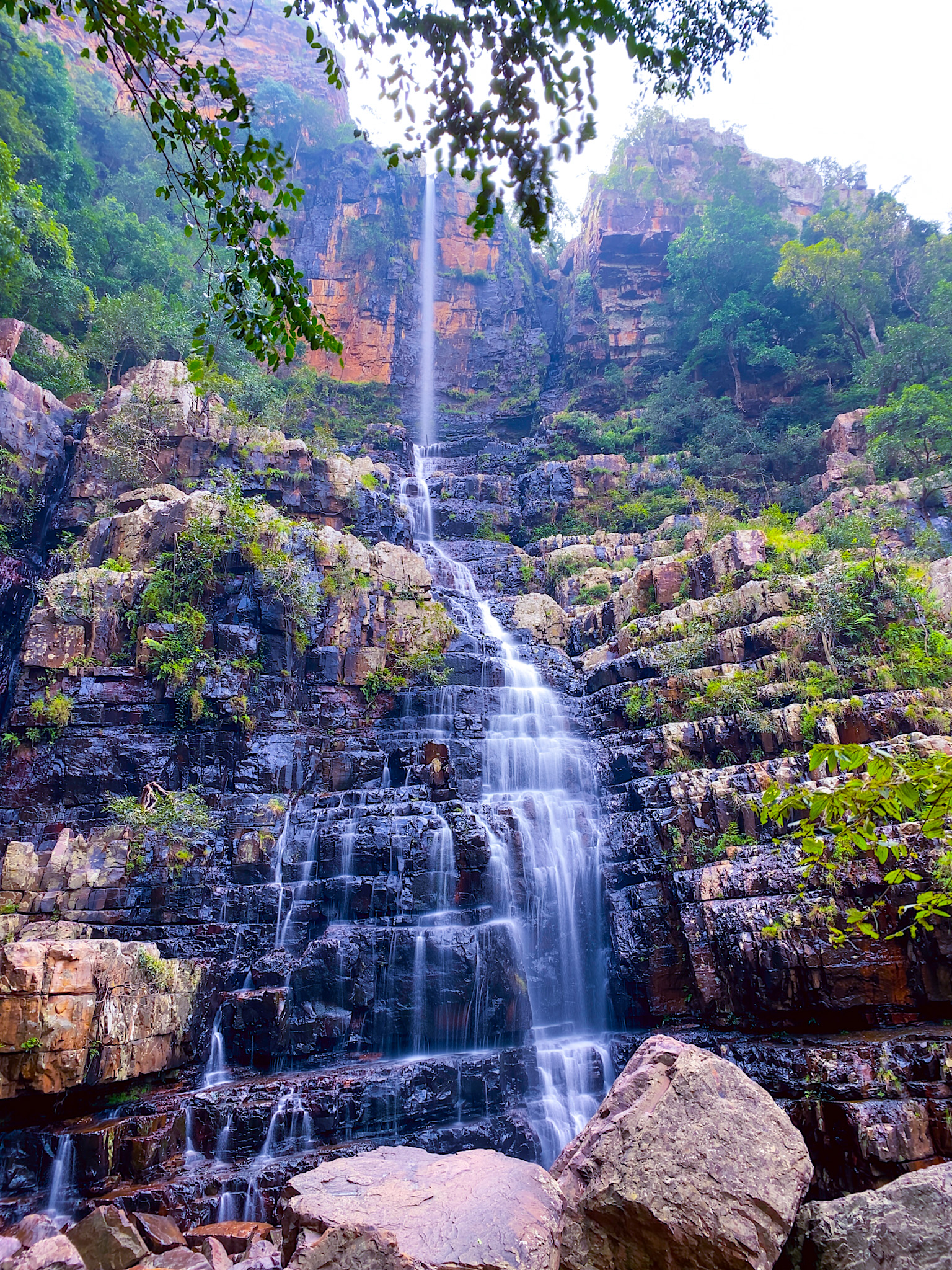
Waterfalls in Talakona

The waters of Talakona are enriched with herbs and people believe that it has healing properties. A long and treacherous trekking route leads to the top of the hill, which can be reached by multiple paths. Talakona hills geographically is considered a part of the Eastern Ghats.

There is a waterfall falling deep into the valley from a cliff on the upper reaches.

There used to be a 240 meter long canopy rope walk, about 35 to 40 feet in height. There are number of trek routes in different categories of difficulty, giving an option for the visitor to choose their route.

In the area there is an ancient Siva temple which is flooded with devotees during Sivarathri festival. There are also deep caves scattered over the mountains where it is believed that sages meditate eternally. A stream flows near the canopy walk area where a bathing ghat is under construction.

Accommodation is also available in this dense forest,

== History of Talakona Temple ==
The Temple at Talakona water falls is a Siva Temple known as the Siddheswara Swamy Temple. The deity is called as 'Siddheswara'. As per the Local people, the temple was built some 140 years ago. The sivalinga in the temple was brought from the ruined temple of Rayavaripalli, a village in Pulicherla Mandal, On olden days there was a custom that if any new temple is constructed, instead of making a new Siva Linga, can install old one which lies without Pooja in ruined Temples. Based on this custom the SIVA LINGA was brought from Rayavaripalli ruined temple. The relics of the ruined temple can be seen today also in the agricultural fields of Rayavaripalli. That field is called as " Lingaakaaram kaada kayya", till today, which means a piece of agricultural field near Siva Lingam.

Talakona is a popular tourist destination located in the Tirupati district of Andhra Pradesh, India. It is known for its scenic waterfalls and forests. Talakona was once part of the Tamil kingdom, which was one of the oldest and most powerful kingdoms in South India.

The Tamil kingdom was founded in the 3rd century BCE and reached its peak in the 10th century CE. During this time, the kingdom controlled a large territory that included present-day Tamil Nadu, Kerala, and parts of Andhra Pradesh. Talakona was a major agricultural and trade center during the Tamil kingdom.

The Tamil kingdom was ruled by a succession of powerful kings, including the Cholas, Pandyas, and Pallavas. These kings were great patrons of art and architecture, and they commissioned the construction of many temples and palaces. Talakona was one of the many sites that benefited from the Tamil kingdom's patronage.

In the 13th century CE, the Tamil kingdom was invaded by the Muslim Delhi Sultanate. The Delhi Sultanate conquered much of South India, including Talakona. The Delhi Sultanate ruled over Talakona for over two centuries, until it was overthrown by the Vijayanagara Empire in the 14th century CE.

== See also ==
- List of waterfalls
- List of waterfalls in India
