= Siddheshwar, Palpa =

Coordinates: 27°57′N 83°23′E

Siddheshwar सिद्धेश्वर
- Village development committee
- Interactive map of Siddheshwar
- Country: Nepal
- Zone: Lumbini Zone
- District: Palpa District

Population (1991)
  - Total: 3,104
- Time zone: UTC+5:45 (Nepal Time)

Siddheshwar is a village development committee in Palpa District in the Lumbini Zone of southern Nepal. At the time of the 1991 Nepal census it had a population of 3,104 people living in 543 individual households.
