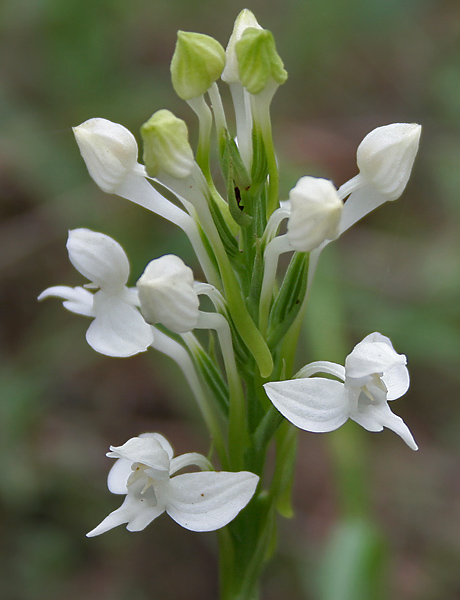
- Habenaria roxburghii in the Talakona forest in India

Conservation status
- CITES Appendix II (CITES)

Scientific classification
- Kingdom: Plantae
- Clade: Tracheophytes
- Clade: Angiosperms
- Clade: Monocots
- Order: Asparagales
- Family: Orchidaceae
- Subfamily: Orchidoideae
- Genus: Habenaria
- Species: H. roxburghii

Binomial name
- Habenaria roxburghii Nicolson

Synonyms
- Orchis plantaginea Roxb.; Orchis platyphyllos Willd.; Orchis roxburghii Pers.; Habenaria platyphylla Spreng.; Gymnadenia plantaginea (Roxb.) Lindl. ex Wall.; Orchis tenuis Rottler ex Wall.; Habenaria platyphylloides M.R.Almeida; Pecteilis roxburghii (Nicolson) M.A.Clem. & D.L.Jones

= Habenaria roxburghii =

Species of orchid

Habenaria roxburghii, commonly known as Roxburgh's habenaria, malle leena gadda and as chekku dumpa in Telugu, is a species of orchid found in southern India. It is a tuberous terrestrial herb, 250–350 mm (10–10 in) tall. There are two or three more or less round leaves, about 70 mm (3 in) long and 50 mm (2 in) wide lying flat on the ground. The flowers pure white are arranged in long, dense cluster up to 80 mm (3 in) long. The sepals are broad egg-shaped, about 8 mm (0.3 in) long and the labellum has three lobes. The middle lobe is 8 mm (0.3 in) long and the side lobes are small. The species is usually found in shady places in the undergrowth of forests and is found in the Eastern Ghats.

== Taxonomy and naming ==
Habenaria roxburghii was first formally described in 1976 by Dan Henry Nicolson and the description was published in the book "Flora of Hassan District, Karnataka, India".
