= Siddhesvara Siva Temple =

- Location in Odisha Siddhesvara Siva Temple (India)

Religion
- Affiliation: Hinduism
- Deity: Siva lingam

Location
- Location: Bhubaneswar
- State: Odisha
- Country: India
- Interactive map of Siddhesvara Siva Temple
- Coordinates: 20°15′53″N 85°51′40″E

Architecture
- Type: Kalingan Style (Kalinga Architecture)
- Completed: 15th century AD
- Elevation: 17 m (56 ft)

Siddhesvara Siva Temple is located inside the Kapilesvara temple precinct, Kapilesvara village, Old Town, Bhubaneswar. It was built in the 15th century AD. The temple is facing east and the presiding deity of the temple is a Siva lingam within a circular yonipitha, which is made of laterite. The cella of vimana is measuring 1.55 square m. The temple is made of sandstone and totally renovated one. It is under the care of Kapilesvara Temple Trust Board.

== Significance ==
=== Historic significance ===
According to the local priest, this temple was constructed during the rule of Kapilendra Deva.

=== Cultural significance ===
Sankranti, Jalasayi ceremony etc.

== Physical description ==
=== Surrounding ===
The temple is surrounded by Kapilesvara compound wall on its northern side at a distance of 4.20 m., Radhakrishna temple on its eastern side at a distance of 6 m.

=== Architectural features (plan and elevation) ===
The temple stands on a low platform measuring 3.50 square m with a height of 0.38 m. On plan, the temple has a vimana and a frontal porch measuring 3.55 m x 3.00 m. The vimana is 3.00 square m and the frontal porch is 0.40 m. On elevation, the temple is in pidha order with bada, gandi and mastaka. Bada is of five mouldings measuring 1.68 m. Gandi with three receding tiers measure 1.20 m. The mastaka consisting of beki, ghanta, amalaka, khapuri, kalasa and ayudha measure 0.80 m. From pabhaga to mastaka the total height of the temple is 3.68 m. The temple is a renovated one.

=== Raha niche & parsva devatas ===
The raha niches measure 0.33 m x 0.25 m x 0.18 m. The northern raha niche houses a four armed image of Goddess Parvati holding trident in her upper left hand and nagapasa in her upper right hand. The other two hands are in abhaya and varada mudra crowned with karanda mukuta. On the right side of the pedestal is the lion mount. The western raha niche enshrines a four armed standing Kartikeya. The image is holding arrow in his upper right hand and bow in his upper left hand. The major right hand is in the form of abhaya mudra, and cock in his major left hand. The image is also wearing karanda mukuta, Yanjopabita and necklace. The southern raha niche enshrines four armed image of Ganesa standing over a lotus pedestal. He is holding broken tusk in his major right hand and modaka patra in his major left hand, mace in his upper left hand and akshamala/ rosary in his upper right hand. Kalingan style of architecture is featured in the construction.

=== Decorative features ===
Door jambs: The doorjambs are decorated with three vertical bands that measure 1.50 m in length x 0.90 m in width. Lintel: The lintel measures 1.30 m.

== State of preservation ==
Fair, Due to recent renovation. It was repaired by Odisha State Archaeology under X & XI Finance Commission Award.

== See also ==
- List of Hindu temples in India § Odisha
