= Siddheshwar Temple, Toka =

Yadava architecture based Hindu temple

Siddheshwar temple, Toka
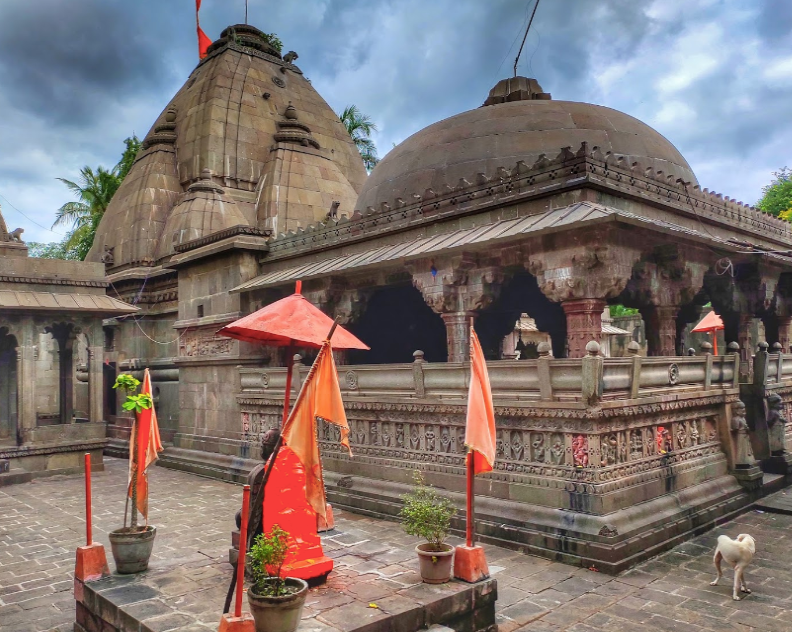
- Siddheshwar temple

Religion
- Affiliation: Hinduism
- Deity: Shiva
- Festival: Shivratri

Location
- Location: Nalanda, Maharashtra
- Interactive map of Siddheshwar temple, Toka
- Coordinates: 19.6222785°N 75.0140806°E

Architecture
- Style: Yadava
- Creator: Seuna (Yadava) dynasty
- Established: Unknown

The Shri Siddheshwar temple complex in Toka village is another finest example of Yadava architecture during 12th-13th century in Marathwada region. After the establishment of the Marathi state, new temples were built during the Peshwa period. There are plenty of sculptures out there. The temple consists of many sculptures from many epic stories or character like Ramayan, Mahabharata, Puranas, Surasundari, Vyal-Sharbha. However, it is not as delicate and diverse as the temple sculptures during the Yadav period. The temple has a big Shivlingam inside the sanctum, with the brass snake and the idol of Parvati in the back wall.

== Architecture ==
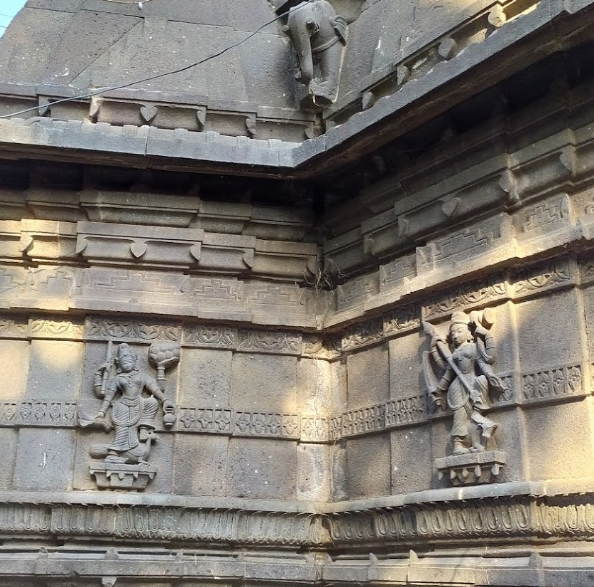
Sculptures of Hindu deities carved on the wall of Siddheshwar temple at Toka, Maharashtra

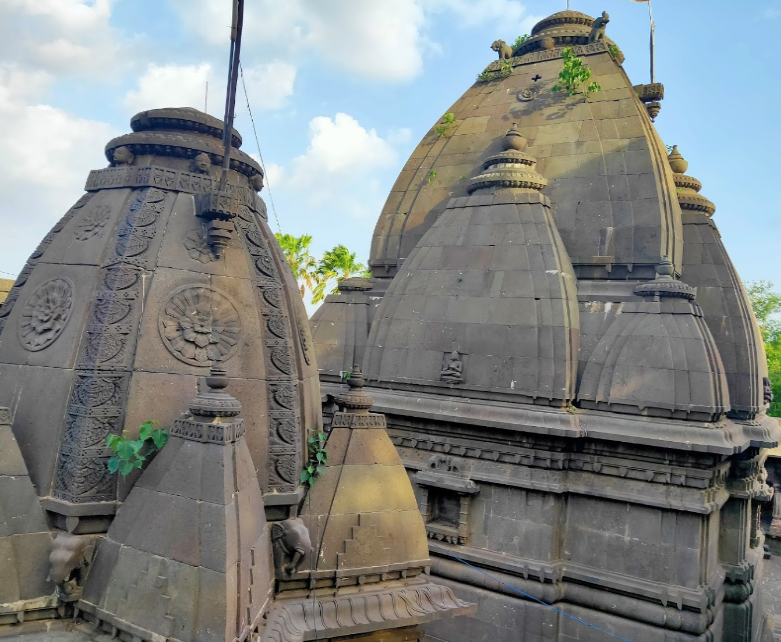
Siddheshwar temple, Toka, Maharashtra

The spire of the main temple is made up of small peaks, designed as a sabhamandap. The pillars of the temple are of Peshwa style. There is a beautiful Nandi in front of the Shiva temple which is very similar to Bhuleshwar Nandi. The beautiful rope carvings on Nandi's back, the chains, the snake's fence, the embroidered stripes, the small bell vines are very beautiful. Jai Vijay is the gatekeeper at the entrance of the temple and Yaksha is the bearer in the sabhamandap and sanctum. There are shrines on the side of the temple in the sculptures on the outer wall. Figures from Epics like Ramayana, Mahabharata and other Puranas are engraved on the walls on all sides of the temple.

On the front side of the temple, a very beautiful Dashavatar plaque is carved. All 10 incarnations of Lord Vishnu like Matsyavatar, Kurmavatar, Varaha Avatar, Nrusinhavatar, Vamana Avatar, Parashuram Avatar, Rama avatar, Krishna avatar, Buddhavatar, Kalki avatar can be seen here.

There is a sculpture carved on the right and left side wall of the main temple, on the left side the king is visiting this temple and on the right side there is a beautiful sculpture of Draupadi. Apart from this, Balakrishna's events in Gokul, Krishna's leela with Gopikas, Arjuna's pride, Bhim's pride, Hanuman Sita's visit to Ashoka forest. There are also some interesting sculptures, carved on the plaque while playing various instruments like women's bhavmudras, nrityamudras, tal, mridang etc., while doing hairdo and playing veena.

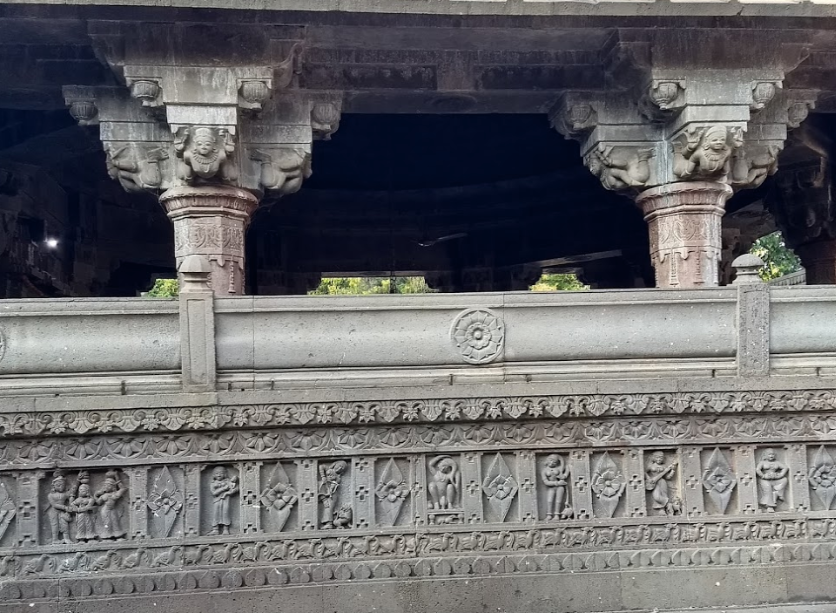
Carving of vedic monks on the pillars of Sidheshwar Temple Toka, Maharashtra

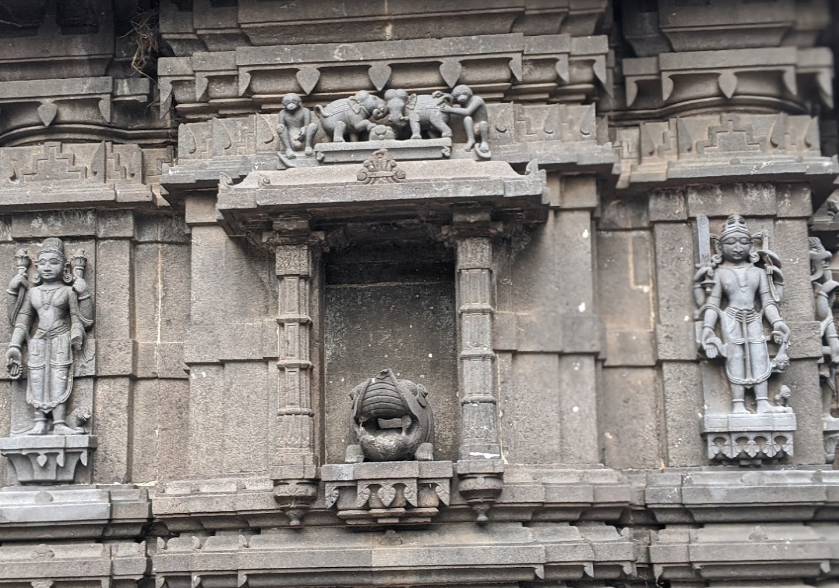
Sculptures of Hindu deities carved on the wall of Siddheshwar temple at Toka, Maharashtra

== Hindu Temples ==
The Vishnu temple

The Vishnu temple on the right is smaller in size than the main temple and has beautiful idols of deities on each side. Lord Varuna idol is carved on the west wall with his vehicle, an elephant while Varuna's snare and his mace are also carved in it. Lord Agni idol is carved in the south-east wall with his vehicle Edka, while idol of Yama can be resemble in the south is his vehicle Reda. Idol of Vayu carved on the northwest wall is standing with a flag in his hand. His vehicle is probably an ox.

Swami Ishan or Rudra from the northeast is standing with Vaish Nandi holding Trishul, Damru, Kamandalu and Nag in his hand. Swami Kubera on the north side is standing with his crocodile. The vehicle of fire is shown in some places as an ox, Varuna's Nakra or a crocodile (since Varuna is a water deity). Unique sculptures of elephants and peacocks are carved on the back wall of this Vishnu temple. Peacocks are so well carved that even the teeth in their jaws can be seen clearly.

Devi Temple

An idol of Chamunda killing a demon by holding a weapon in his hand can be seen inside the temple. One hand is held a seed supplement (mhalunga fruit pulp) which symbolizes the goodness of innovation / regeneration. There are various beautiful idols like Mahalakshmi sitting on lotus, Narasimhi with lion, Indri or Indrani with elephant, Vaishnavi with eagle vehicle.
