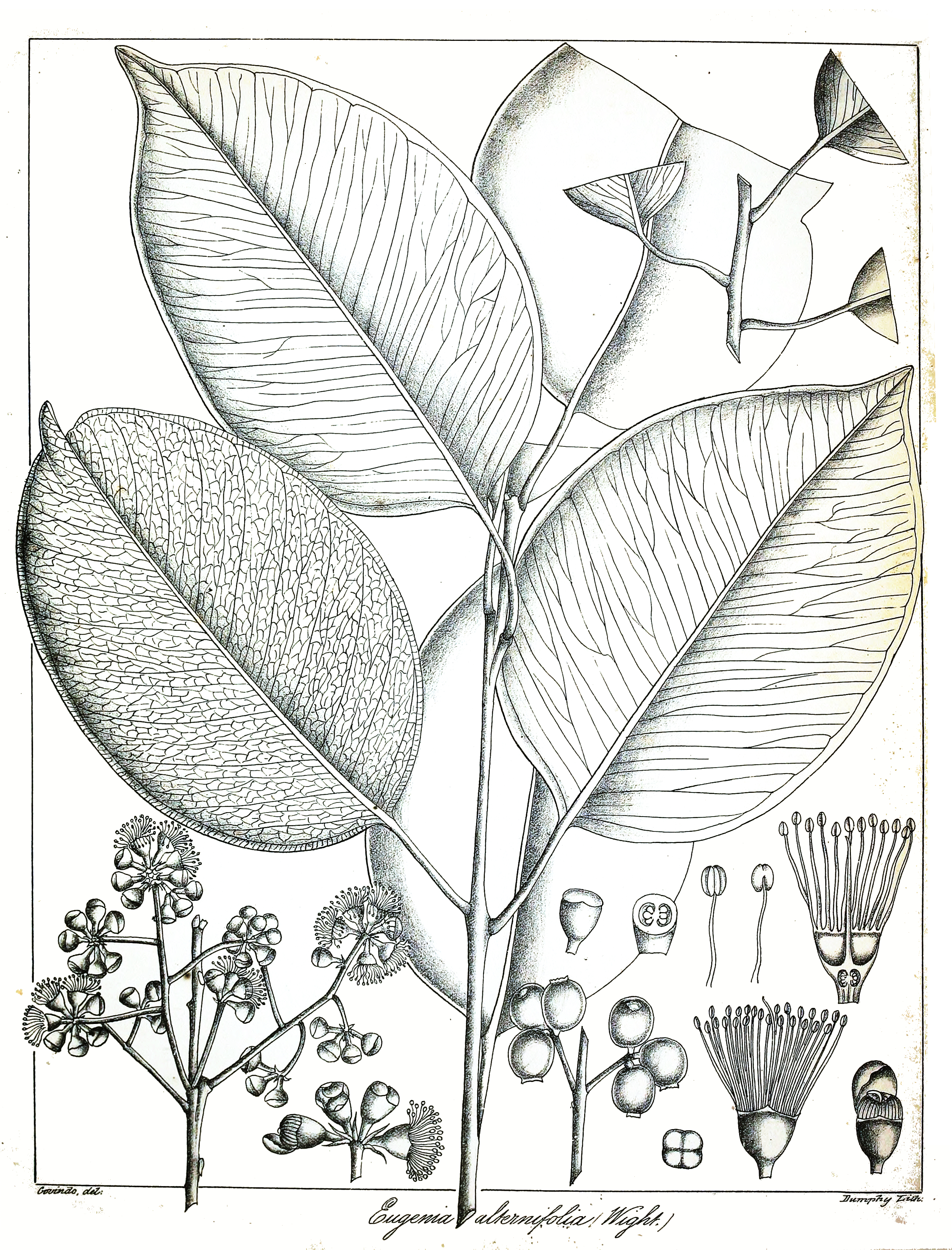

Conservation status
- Endangered (IUCN 3.1)

Scientific classification
- Kingdom: Plantae
- Clade: Tracheophytes
- Clade: Angiosperms
- Clade: Eudicots
- Clade: Rosids
- Order: Myrtales
- Family: Myrtaceae
- Genus: Syzygium
- Species: S. alternifolium

Binomial name
- Syzygium alternifolium (Wight) Walp.

Synonyms
- Eugenia alternifolia Wight

= Syzygium alternifolium =

Species of flowering plant

Syzygium alternifolium is a species of plant in the family Myrtaceae. It is native to North Arcot, Cuddapah, Kurnool, and the Nagari hills, in eastern Chittoor district, India. It has alternate leaves. It grows in dry and moist deciduous tropical forests in Eastern Ghats from 650 to 850 metres elevation.
