= Yerravaripalem =

Yerravaripalem Erravaripalem
- Village
- Interactive map of Yerravaripalem
- Location in Andhra Pradesh, India
- Coordinates: 13.7167°N 79.15°E
- Country: India
- State: Andhra Pradesh
- District: Tirupati
- Mandal: Yerravaripalem

Languages
  - Official: Telugu
- Time zone: UTC+5:30 (IST)
- Vehicle registration: AP
- Nearest cities: Pileru, Tirupati
- Assembly Constituency: Chandragiri

Yerravaripalem or Erravaripalem is a village in Tirupati district of the Indian state of Andhra Pradesh. It is the mandal headquarters of Yerravaripalem mandal.

== Geography ==
Yerravaripalem is located at 13.7167°N 79.15°E. It has an average elevation of 592 meters (1945 feet).
