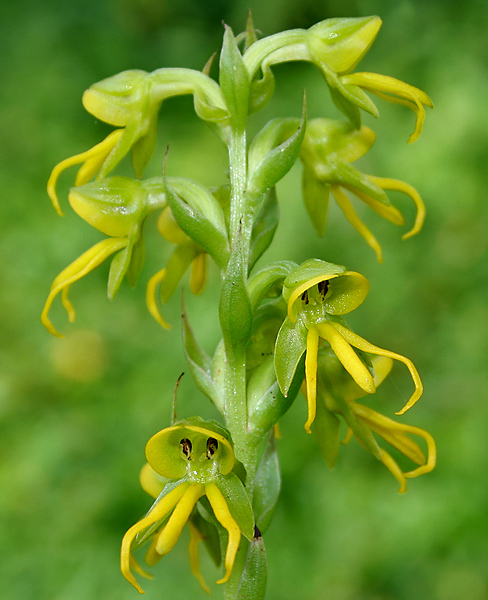
- Habenaria marginata

Scientific classification
- Kingdom: Plantae
- Clade: Tracheophytes
- Clade: Angiosperms
- Clade: Monocots
- Order: Asparagales
- Family: Orchidaceae
- Subfamily: Orchidoideae
- Tribe: Orchideae
- Subtribe: Orchidinae
- Genus: Habenaria; Willd.

Species
- Over 800, see List of Habenaria species

Synonyms
- List: Ala Szlach.; Alinorchis Szlach.; Aopla Lindl.; Arachnaria Szlach.; Ate Lindl.; Bertauxia Szlach.; Bilabrella Lindl.; Centrochilus Schauer; Ceratopetalorchis Szlach., Górniak & Tukallo; Diplectraden Raf.; Dissorhynchium Schauer; Fimbrorchis Szlach.; Habenella Small; Habenorkis Thouars; Itaculumia Hoehne; Kraenzlinorchis Szlach.; Kryptostoma (Summerh.) Geerinck; Kusibabella Szlach.; Macrocentrum Phil.; Macrura (Kraenzl.) Szlach. & Sawicka; Medusorchis Szlach.; Mesicera Raf.; Mirandorchis Szlach. & Kras-Lap.; Montolivaea Rchb.f.; Nemuranthes Raf.; Ochyrorchis Szlach.; Odisha S.Misra; Plantaginorchis Szlach.; Platantheroides Szlach.; Platycorynoides Szlach.; Plectoglossa (Hook.f.) K.Prasad & Venu; Podandria Rolfe; Podandriella Szlach.; Pseudocoeloglossum (Szlach. & Olszewski) Szlach.; Pseudohemipilia Szlach.; Pseudoperistylus (P.F.Hunt) Szlach. & Olszewski; Renzorchis Szlach. & Olszewski; Rhinorchis Szlach.; Schlechterorchis Szlach.; Senghasiella Szlach.; Smithanthe Szlach. & Marg.; Synmeria Nimmo; Trachypetalum Szlach. & Sawicka

= Habenaria =

Rein orchids

Species of orchid

Habenaria, commonly called rein orchids or bog orchids, is a widely distributed genus of orchids in the tribe Orchideae. About 880 species of Habenaria have been formally described. They are native to every continent except Antarctica, growing in both tropical and subtropical zones.

== Description ==
Plants in the genus Habenaria are mainly terrestrial plants with fleshy tubers and upright, tall, thin or fleshy stems. The leaves are either arranged in a rosette at the base of the plants or scattered up the stem. The flowers are resupinate, usually small, white, green or yellowish and arranged along a tall flowering stem. The dorsal sepal and petals overlap to form a hood over the column. The labellum has a spur and usually three lobes which may be short or long and threadlike. The distinguishing feature of the genus is the presence of two club-shaped projections on the stigma.

== Taxonomy and naming ==
The genus Habenaria was first formally described in 1805 by Carl Ludwig Willdenow and the description was published in Species Plantarum. The generic name is derived from the Latin word habena meaning "thong", "strap" or "rein".

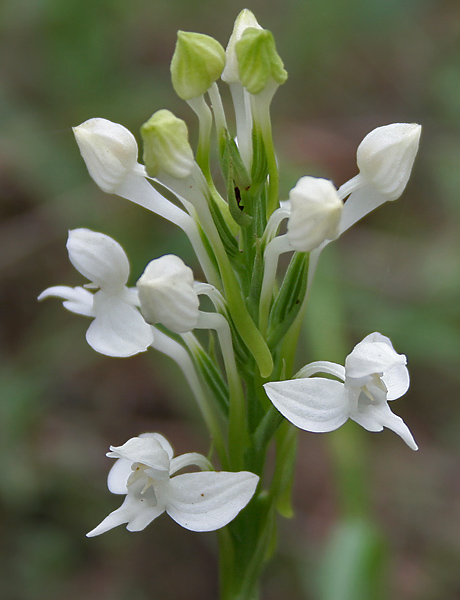
Habenaria roxburghii flowers in Talakona, India

== See also ==
- List of Habenaria species

== Distribution and habitat ==
Rein orchids are distributed in tropical and subtropical regions and with centres of diversity in Africa and Brazil. Seventeen species are known in Australia.
