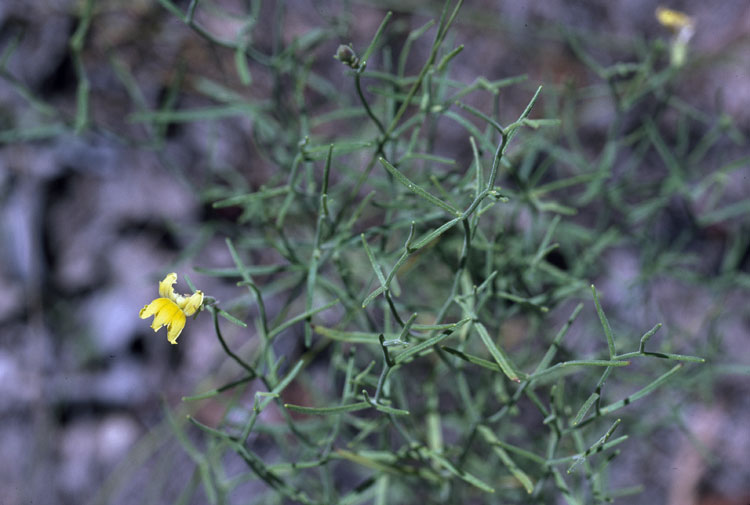
- In Kakadu National Park

Scientific classification
- Kingdom: Plantae
- Clade: Tracheophytes
- Clade: Angiosperms
- Clade: Eudicots
- Clade: Asterids
- Order: Asterales
- Family: Goodeniaceae
- Genus: Goodenia
- Species: G. cirrifica

Binomial name
- Goodenia cirrifica F.Muell.

= Goodenia cirrifica =

Species of plant

Goodenia cirrifica is a species of flowering plant in the family Goodeniaceae and is endemic to northern Australia. It is an ascending, widely branched, sticky herb with short-lived, lance-shaped to egg-shaped leaves at the base, linear stem leaves, and racemes of small yellow flowers.

== Description ==
Goodenia cirrifica is an ascending, widely branched herb that typically grows to a height of 40 cm (16 in) long and has sticky foliage and zig-zagged branches. The leaves at the base of the plant are short-lived, lance-shaped to egg-shaped with the narrower end towards the base, up to 30 mm (1.2 in) long and 8 mm (0.31 in) wide, the stem leaves linear and 10–50 mm (0.39–1.97 in) long. The flowers are arranged in racemes up to 300 mm (12 in) long on a peduncle 5–20 mm (0.20–0.79 in) long with leaf-like bracts at the base. The sepals are narrow elliptic to lance-shaped, 2–3.5 mm (0.079–0.138 in) long, the petals yellow, 7–10 mm (0.28–0.39 in) long. The lower lobes of the corolla are 2–3 mm (0.079–0.118 in) long with wings about 1 mm (0.039 in) wide. Flowering occurs from March to October and the fruit is an oval capsule about 5 mm (0.20 in) long.

== Taxonomy and naming ==
Goodenia cirrifica was first formally described in 1886 by Ferdinand von Mueller in The Australasian Journal of Pharmacy from specimens collected "on the Alligator-River" by Maurice William Holtze.

== Distribution and habitat ==
This goodenia grows in forest and woodland in the northern part of the Northern Territory.
