= Holtze =

Holtze may refer to:

- Holtze, Northern Territory, a suburb of Darwin
- Maurice William Holtze or Moritz William Holtze (1840–1923), German gardener and botanist, agronomist, pomologist, and garden director after which the suburb is named

== See also ==
- Stine Nielsen (born 1991), Danish sports shooter; middle name 'Holtze'
