= Calochilus richiae =

Bald-tip beard orchid

Conservation status
- Endangered (EPBC Act)

Scientific classification
- Kingdom: Plantae
- Clade: Embryophytes
- Clade: Tracheophytes
- Clade: Spermatophytes
- Clade: Angiosperms
- Clade: Monocots
- Order: Asparagales
- Family: Orchidaceae
- Subfamily: Orchidoideae
- Tribe: Diurideae
- Genus: Calochilus
- Species: C. richiae

Binomial name
- Calochilus richiae D.L.Jones

Species of orchid

Calochilus richiae, commonly known as the bald-tip beard orchid, is a species of orchid endemic to a small area in Victoria. It is a rare species, discovered in 1928 but not seen again until 1968 and its numbers are in decline. It has a single dark green leaf and up to five reddish brown flowers with darker stripes and a labellum with short, spiky, purplish "hairs".

== Description ==
Calochilus richiae is a terrestrial, perennial, deciduous, herb with an underground tuber and a single dark green, linear, channelled leaf 150–300 mm (6–10 in) long and 10–13 mm (0.4–0.5 in) wide. The leaf is fully developed at flowering time. Up to five reddish brown flowers with darker stripes, 30–35 mm (1.2–1.4 in) long and 20–25 mm (0.8–1 in) wide are borne on a flowering stem 200–360 mm (8–10 in) tall. Individual flowers last for between two and four days. The dorsal sepal is egg-shaped, 12–15 mm (0.5–0.6 in) long and 7–10 mm (0.3–0.4 in) wide. The lateral sepals are a similar length but narrower and the petals are 6–8 mm (0.2–0.3 in) long and 5–6 mm (0.20–0.24 in) wide. The labellum is flat, narrow near its base then egg-shaped, 12–15 mm (0.5–0.6 in) long and 7–8 mm (0.28–0.31 in) wide. Three quarters of the labellum is covered with short, spiky purple calli and the tip tapers to a short "tail". The column has two purple "eyes" connected by a ridge. Flowering occurs in September and October.

== Taxonomy and naming ==
Calochilus richiae was first formally described in 1929 by William Henry Nicholls from a specimen collected near Whroo and the description was published in The Victorian Naturalist. The specific epithet (richiae) honour Mrs. Edith Rich who discovered the species.

Nicholls published the name Calochilus richii, Australian authorities currently use the spelling Calochilus richiae.

== Distribution and habitat ==
The bald-tip beard orchid grows in hilly open forest. It is only known from a single population of fewer than twenty plants near Rushworth.

== Ecology ==
This orchid is pollinated by male scoliid wasps from the genus Campsomeris when they attempt to copulate with the labellum. The capsules mature five to eight weeks later. This orchid reproduces only from seed.

== Conservation ==
This orchid was first discovered in 1928 but was not seen again until 1968. About 23 plants were seen in flower in 1980 but the numbers have declined since then to between none and four plants in flower between 1998 and 2004. The species is listed as "endangered" under the Australian Government Environment Protection and Biodiversity Conservation Act 1999 and the Victorian Government Flora and Fauna Guarantee Act 1988. The main threats to the species are grazing by native herbivores, habitat disturbance as a result of illegal rubbish dumping, illegal firewood collection and illegal collecting of the flowers.
