= Calochilus gracillimus =

Slender beard orchid

Scientific classification
- Kingdom: Plantae
- Clade: Tracheophytes
- Clade: Angiosperms
- Clade: Monocots
- Order: Asparagales
- Family: Orchidaceae
- Subfamily: Orchidoideae
- Tribe: Diurideae
- Genus: Calochilus
- Species: C. gracillimus

Binomial name
- Calochilus gracillimus Rupp

Synonyms
- Calochilus praeltus D.L.Jones; Calochilus sandrae D.L.Jones

Species of orchid

Calochilus gracillimus, commonly known as slender beard orchid or late beard orchid, is a species of orchid endemic to eastern Australia. It has a single dark green leaf with a reddish base and up to nine green flowers with red stripes and a reddish, brownish or purplish "beard".

== Description ==
Calochilus gracillimus is a terrestrial, perennial, deciduous, herb with an underground tuber and a single fleshy, channelled, linear to lance-shaped, dark green leaf, 150–300 mm (6–10 in) long and 6–8 mm (0.2–0.3 in) wide with a reddish base. The leaf is fully developed when the first flower opens. Between two and nine green flowers with red stripes, 30–37 mm (1.2–1.5 in) long and 7–9 mm (0.3–0.4 in) wide are borne on a flowering stem 300–450 mm (10–20 in) tall. The dorsal sepal is 10–12 mm (0.4–0.5 in) long and 6–8 mm (0.2–0.3 in) wide. The lateral sepals are a similar length but narrower. The petals are 7–8 mm (0.28–0.31 in) long and about 5 mm (0.2 in) wide. The labellum is flat, 30–34 mm (1.2–1.3 in) long and 5–6 mm (0.20–0.24 in) wide with short purple calli near its base. The middle section of the labellum has coarse reddish, brownish or purplish hairs up to 7 mm (0.3 in) and the tip has a glandular "tail" 4–5 mm (0.16–0.20 in) long. The column has two purple coloured "eyes" joined by a faint ridge. Flowering occurs from November to January.

== Taxonomy and naming ==
Calochilus gracillimus was first formally described in 1943 by Montague Rupp and the description was published in The Victorian Naturalist from a specimen collected near Woy Woy. The specific epithet (gracillimus) is a Latin word meaning "slenderest". Rupp noted that the specific epithet "is in particular allusion to the labellum, but is almost equally applicable to the whole flower".

== Distribution and habitat ==
Slender beard orchid grows on ridges and slopes in forest and woodland. It occurs in New South Wales north from Woodford and in southeastern Queensland.
