= Calochilus praealtus =

Lofty beard orchid

Scientific classification
- Kingdom: Plantae
- Clade: Tracheophytes
- Clade: Angiosperms
- Clade: Monocots
- Order: Asparagales
- Family: Orchidaceae
- Subfamily: Orchidoideae
- Tribe: Diurideae
- Genus: Calochilus
- Species: C. praealtus

Binomial name
- Calochilus praealtus D.L.Jones

Species of orchid

Calochilus praealtus, commonly known as lofty beard orchid, is a species of orchid endemic to the Northern Tablelands of New South Wales. It has a single pale green leaf and up to six pale green flowers with faint red stripes and a labellum with a dark purple beard. It is only known from two mountainous areas.

== Description ==
Calochilus praealtus is a terrestrial, perennial, deciduous, herb with an underground tuber and a single pale green leaf 180–400 mm (7–20 in) long, 4–8 mm (0.2–0.3 in) wide and fully developed at flowering time. The leaf has a powdery coating and a purplish red base. Between two and six pale green flowers with faint red stripes are borne on a flowering stem 280–500 mm (10–20 in) tall. Individual flowers last for between two and four days. The dorsal sepal is broadly lance-shaped to egg-shaped, 12–14 mm (0.5–0.6 in) long and 8–9 mm (0.3–0.4 in) wide. The lateral sepals are a similar length but only about half as wide and spread apart from each other. The petals are 7–8 mm (0.28–0.31 in) long, about 5 mm (0.2 in) wide, asymmetrically egg-shaped with a small upturned tip. The labellum is flat, 22–24 mm (0.87–0.94 in) long, about 7 mm (0.3 in) wide, with short, thick purple calli near its base. The central part of the labellum is covered with dark purple hairs up to 6 mm (0.2 in) long and there is a glandular tip which is 15–17 mm (0.6–0.7 in) long and about 1 mm (0.04 in) wide. The column has two yellowish "eyes" joined by a faint ridge. Flowering occurs from December to February but the flowers only last between two and four days.

== Taxonomy and naming ==
Calochilus praealtus was first formally described in 2006 by David Jones from a specimen collected in Mount Kaputar National Park and the description was published in Australian Orchid Research. The specific epithet (praealtus) is a Latin word meaning "very high".

Jones gave the species the name Calochilus praeltus, misspelling the Greek word and mentioning that its meaning is "high altitude, elevation; in reference to its occurrence at high altitudes". The misspelling has been copied by the Australian Plant Name Index.

== Distribution and habitat ==
Lofty beard orchid grows with grasses in snow gum woodland. It is only known from Barrington Tops and the Mount Kaputar National Park.
