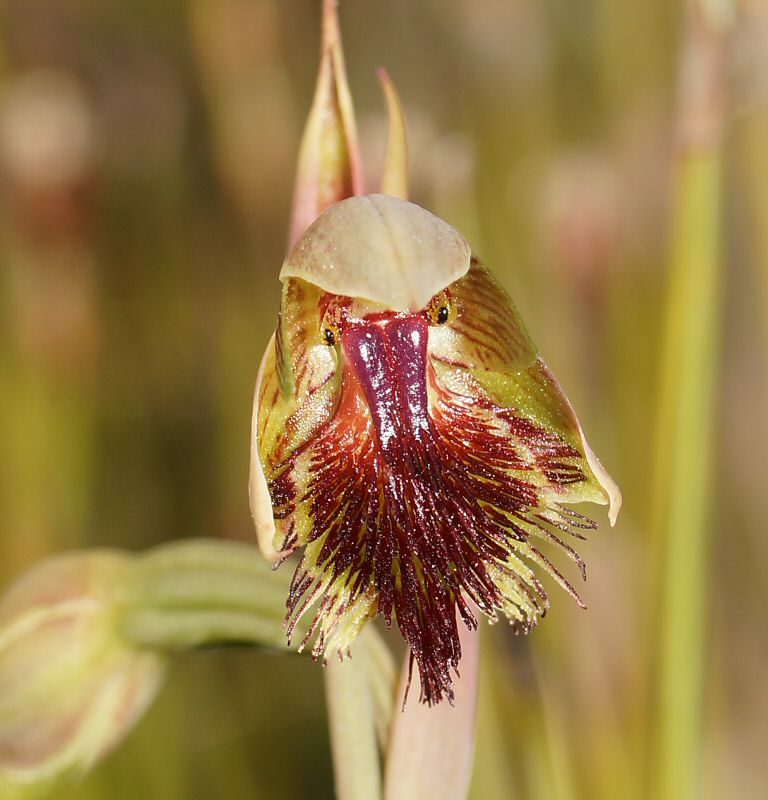
- Near Marrawah in Tasmania

Conservation status
- Nationally Critical (NZ TCS)

Scientific classification
- Kingdom: Plantae
- Clade: Tracheophytes
- Clade: Angiosperms
- Clade: Monocots
- Order: Asparagales
- Family: Orchidaceae
- Subfamily: Orchidoideae
- Tribe: Diurideae
- Genus: Calochilus
- Species: C. herbaceus

Binomial name
- Calochilus herbaceus Lindl.

Synonyms
- Calochilus herbaceous G.N.Backh. & Jeanes orth. var.

= Calochilus herbaceus =

Pale beard orchid

Species of orchid

Calochilus herbaceus, commonly known as the copper beard orchid or pale beard orchid, is a species of orchid native to south-eastern Australia and northern New Zealand. It has a single very short, rigid, fleshy leaf and up to eight pale green to brownish flowers with reddish stripes and a purple "beard".

== Description ==
Calochilus herbaceus is a terrestrial, perennial, deciduous, herb with an underground tuber and a single fleshy, channelled leaf 30–60 mm (1–2 in) long, 6–12 mm (0.2–0.5 in) wide and triangular in cross section. Up to eight pale green to brownish flowers with reddish stripes, 14–20 mm (0.6–0.8 in) long and 10–14 mm (0.4–0.6 in) wide are borne on a flowering stem 150–400 mm (6–20 in) tall. The dorsal sepal is erect, egg-shaped, 9–12 mm (0.4–0.5 in) long and 6–8 mm (0.24–0.31 in) wide. The lateral sepals are egg-shaped, 9–12 mm (0.4–0.5 in) long and 6–8 mm (0.24–0.31 in) wide. The petals are lance-shaped to egg-shaped, 8–10 mm (0.3–0.4 in) long, 5–6 mm (0.20–0.24 in) wide and spread below the labellum. The labellum is triangular, curved in side view, 10–14 mm (0.4–0.6 in) long and 6–8 mm (0.2–0.3 in) wide. The base of the labellum has between two and six smooth, metallic blue plates and the middle part has a few bristly purple hairs. The tip has a short glandular "tail" about 3 mm (0.12 in) long. The column has two sham "eyes" joined by a faint ridge. Flowering occurs from October to January but each flower only lasts for one or two days.

== Taxonomy and naming ==
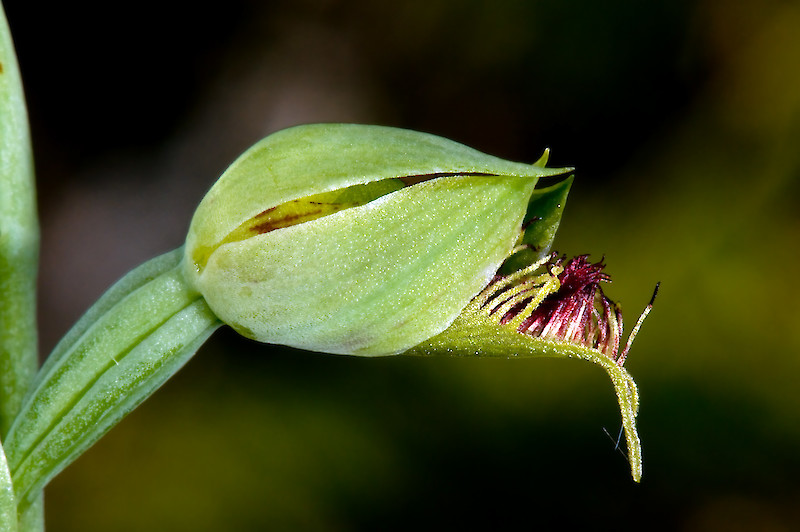
Calochilus herbaceus in Albany, Auckland, New Zealand

Calochilus herbaceus was first formally described in 1840 by John Lindley from a specimen collected near Rocky Cape, Tasmania, Australia. The description was published in his book The Genera and Species of Orchidaceous Plants. The genus name Calochilus is from the Greek "kalos" (beautiful) and "cheilos" (lip), referring to the flower's labellum, while the specific epithet (herbaceus) is Latin for "of plants".

New Zealand populations and some plants in Australia seem to differ from other C. herbaceus and may represent a separate species.

== Distribution and habitat ==
In Australia this orchid grows in wet coastal scrub, sedges and heath in southern Victoria and Tasmania (including Flinders Island and King Island). In New Zealand it is found in ephemeral wetlands and peat bogs in Northland, in a few scattered populations from Te Paki south to Albany, Auckland.

== Conservation status ==
In New Zealand, C. herbaceus is listed as Threatened, Nationally Critical, with the qualifiers EF (extreme fluctuations), SO (secure overseas), and Sp (sparse) in the most recent assessment (2017-2018) of the New Zealand Threatened Classification for plants. It is estimated there are less than 250 total individuals of this species in New Zealand.
