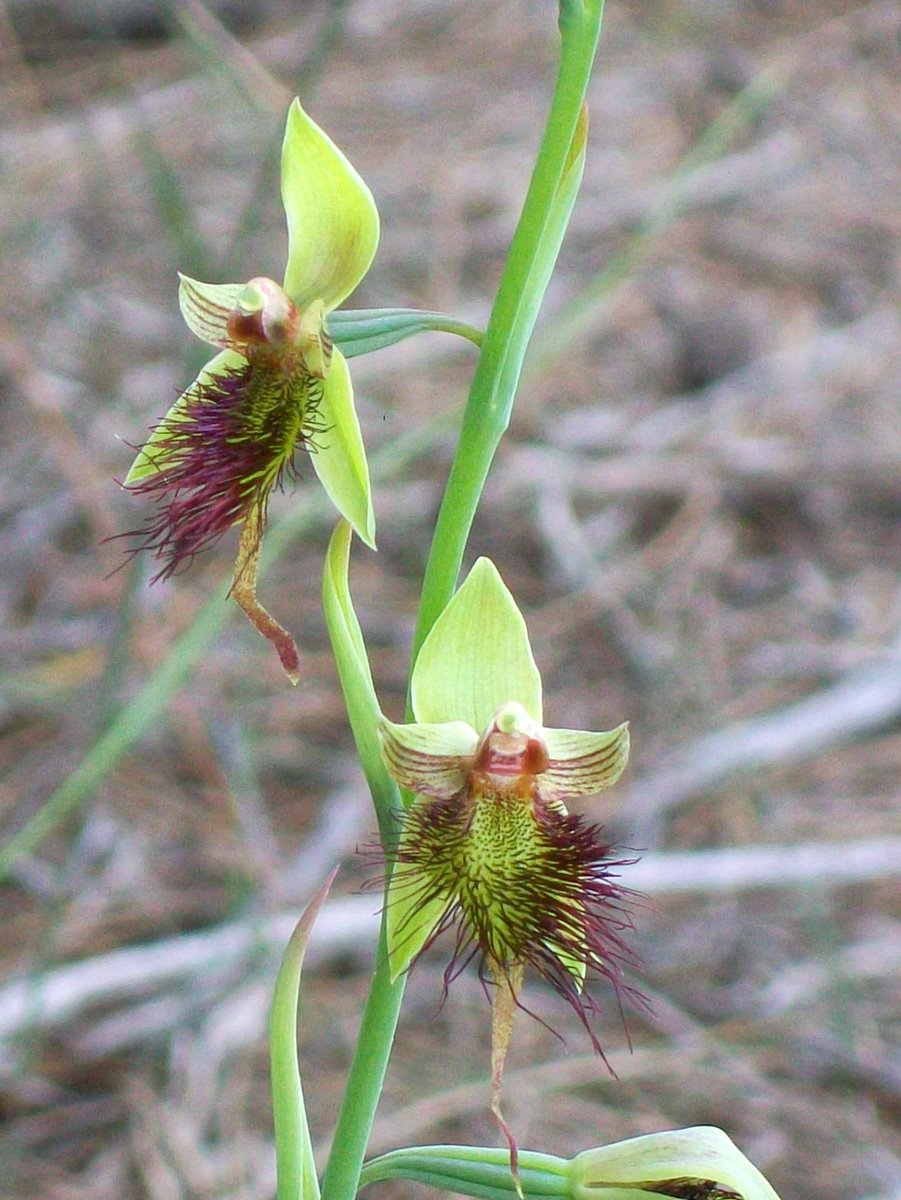
- Calochilus paludosus in Ku-ring-gai Chase National Park, Australia

Scientific classification
- Kingdom: Plantae
- Clade: Tracheophytes
- Clade: Angiosperms
- Clade: Monocots
- Order: Asparagales
- Family: Orchidaceae
- Subfamily: Orchidoideae
- Tribe: Diurideae
- Genus: Calochilus
- Species: C. paludosus

Binomial name
- Calochilus paludosus R.Br.

= Calochilus paludosus =

Red beard orchid

Species of orchid

Calochilus paludosus, commonly known as the red beard orchid or red beardie, is a species of orchid native to Australia and New Zealand. It has a single fleshy, light green leaf and up to nine greenish flowers with reddish stripes. The labellum has a dull red or coppery coloured beard and lacks the "eye" spots of other beard orchids.

== Description ==
Calochilus paludosus is a terrestrial, perennial, deciduous, herb with an underground tuber and a single fleshy, light green to yellowish-green, linear to lance-shaped leaf which is 100–180 mm (4–7 in) long and 4–7 mm (0.2–0.3 in) wide. Unlike some others in the genus, the leaf is fully developed at flowering time. Up to nine greenish flowers with reddish stripes are borne on a flowering stem 150–350 mm (6–10 in) tall. The dorsal sepal is 11–15 mm (0.4–0.6 in) long, 6–8 mm (0.2–0.3 in) wide and the lateral sepals are a similar length but broader. The petals are 5–8 mm (0.2–0.3 in) long and 4–5 mm (0.2–0.2 in) wide. The labellum is flat, 22–28 mm (0.87–1.1 in) long, 7–9 mm (0.28–0.35 in) wide, with short, reddish calli near its base and a flap-like ridge on each outside edge. The middle section of the labellum has coarse, dull red or coppery coloured hairs up to 7 mm (0.3 in) and the tip has a hairless "tail" 10–14 mm (0.4–0.6 in) long and about 1 mm (0.04 in) wide. The column lacks the sham "eyes" of most other beard orchids. Flowering occurs from September to January.

== Taxonomy and naming ==
Calochilus paludosus was first formally described in 1810 by Robert Brown and the description was published in Prodromus Florae Novae Hollandiae. The specific epithet (paludosus) is a Latin word meaning "boggy" or "marshy".

== Distribution and habitat ==
The red beard orchid is widespread in eastern Australia where it grows in heath and open forest, often in wet places but also in drier open forest. It is found in Queensland south from Burleigh Heads, in mostly coastal districts of New South Wales, mostly in the higher rainfall areas of Victoria and in Tasmania but is only known from a single population in South Australia. In New Zealand, C. paludosus occurs in the North Island, often near geothermally active ground, and the northern part of the South Island.
