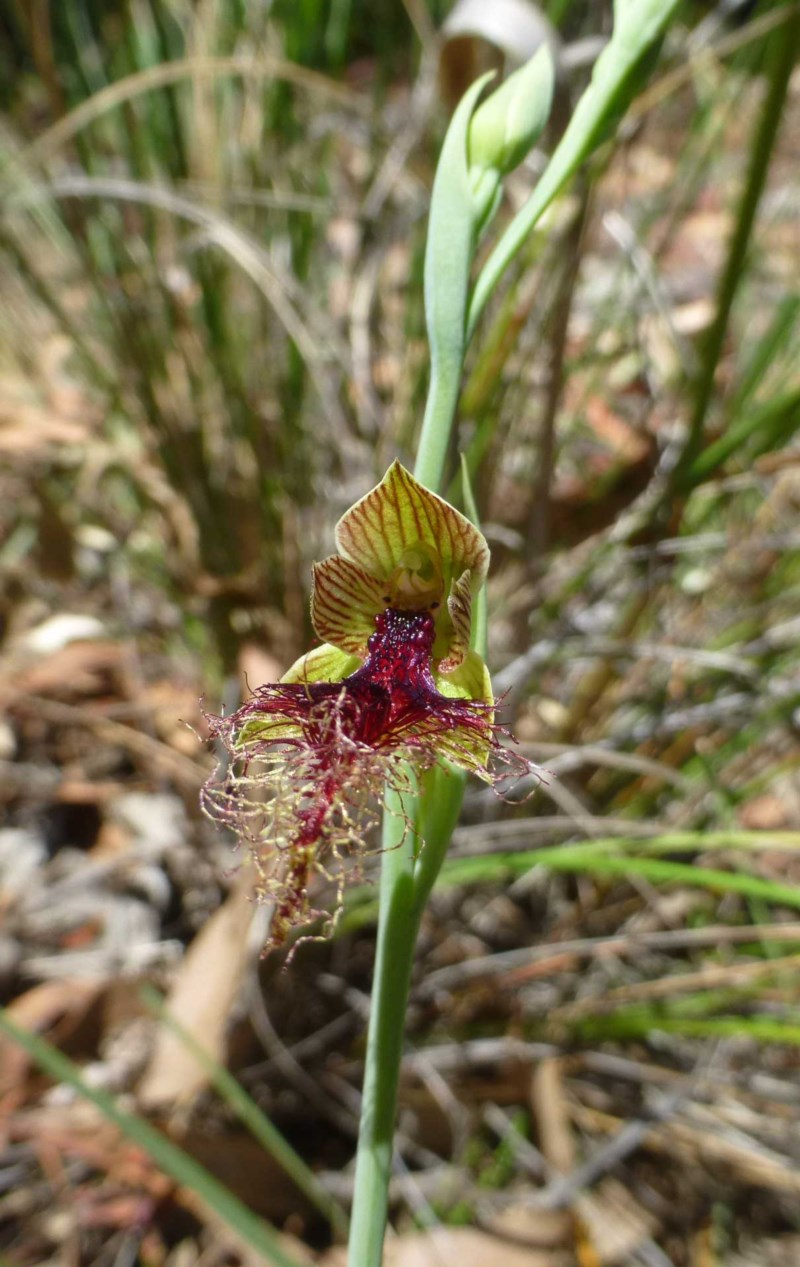
- On Black Mountain in the A.C.T.

Scientific classification
- Kingdom: Plantae
- Clade: Tracheophytes
- Clade: Angiosperms
- Clade: Monocots
- Order: Asparagales
- Family: Orchidaceae
- Subfamily: Orchidoideae
- Tribe: Diurideae
- Genus: Calochilus
- Species: C. therophilus

Binomial name
- Calochilus therophilus D.L.Jones

= Calochilus therophilus =

Late beard orchid

Species of orchid

Calochilus therophilus, commonly known as late beard orchid, is a species of orchid endemic to eastern Australia. It has a single channelled, dark green leaf with a reddish base and up to fifteen dull greenish flowers with bold red stripes. The labellum has a dark purplish beard with two "eye" spots. Unlike that of other beard orchids, there is no prominent ridge between the eye spots.

== Description ==
Calochilus therophilus is a terrestrial, perennial, deciduous, herb with an underground tuber and a single fleshy, channelled, linear to lance-shaped, dark green leaf, 200–400 mm (8–20 in) long and 20–28 mm (0.8–1 in) wide with a reddish purple base. The leaf is fully developed when the first flower opens. Between three and fifteen dull greenish flowers with bold red stripes are borne on a flowering stem 200–950 mm (8–40 in) tall. The dorsal sepal is erect, 11–14 mm (0.4–0.6 in) long and 7–8 mm (0.28–0.31 in) wide. The lateral sepals are a similar length but narrower. The petals are 6–8 mm (0.24–0.31 in) long and about 5 mm (0.2 in) wide. The labellum curves forwards and is 19–22 mm (0.7–0.9 in) long and 5–6 mm (0.20–0.24 in) wide with short, thick, purple calli near its base. The middle section of the labellum has coarse hairs up to 8 mm (0.3 in) and the tip has a glandular "tail" 4–6 mm (0.16–0.24 in) long. The column has two purple coloured "eyes" joined by a faint ridge. Flowering occurs from December to March.

== Taxonomy and naming ==
Calochilus therophilus was first formally described in 2006 by David Jones and the description was published in Australian Orchid Research from a specimen collected on Black Mountain in the Australian Capital Territory. The specific epithet (therophilus) is derived from the Greek words theros meaning "summer" and philos "loving", referring to the summer flowering period of this orchid.

== Distribution and habitat ==
Late beard orchid grows in open forest or with grasses and shrubs on mountain slopes. It occurs in central eastern Queensland, eastern New South Wales, the Australian Capital Territory and north-eastern Victoria.
