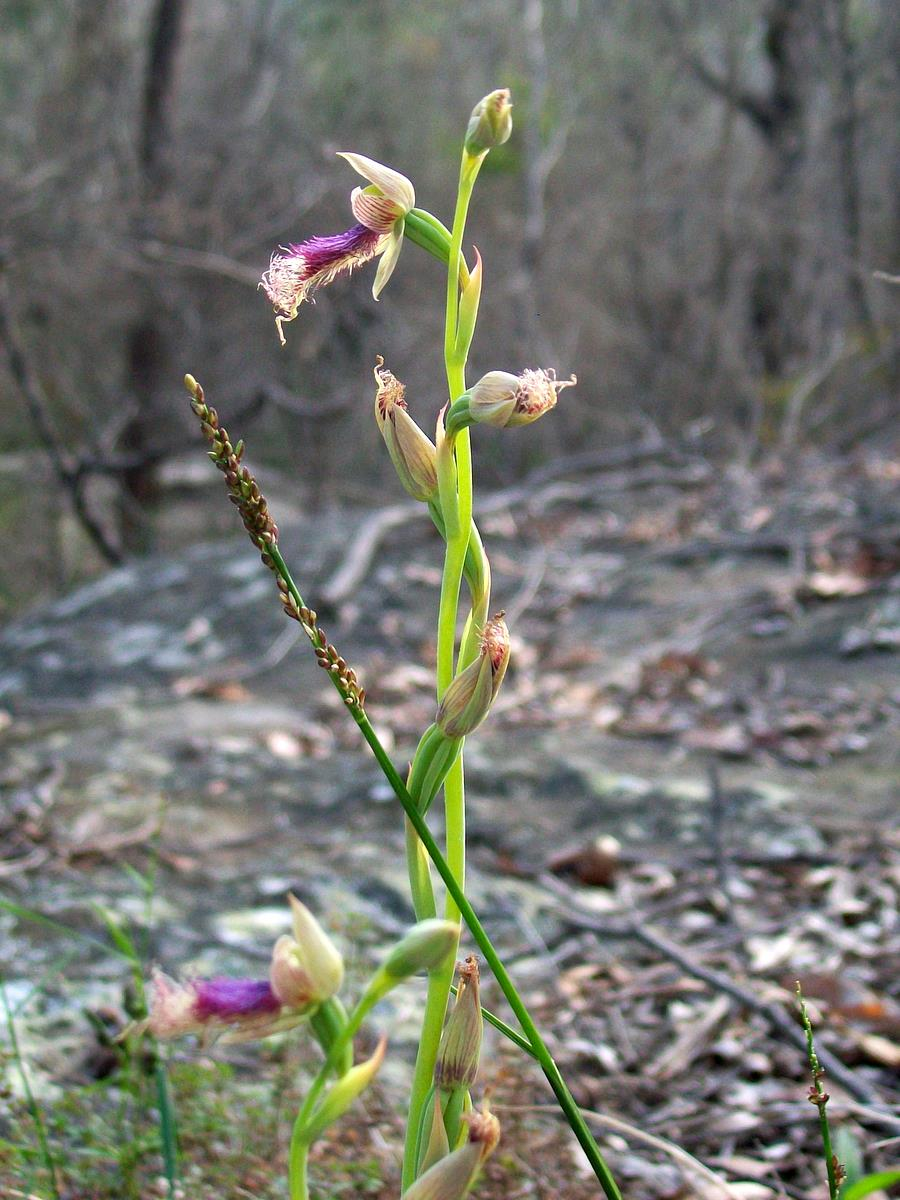
- In Lane Cove National Park

Scientific classification
- Kingdom: Plantae
- Clade: Tracheophytes
- Clade: Angiosperms
- Clade: Monocots
- Order: Asparagales
- Family: Orchidaceae
- Subfamily: Orchidoideae
- Tribe: Diurideae
- Genus: Calochilus
- Species: C. robertsonii

Binomial name
- Calochilus robertsonii Benth.

Synonyms
- Calochilus robertsoni Benth. orth. var.,/small>

= Calochilus robertsonii =

Purple beard orchid

Species of orchid

Calochilus robertsonii, commonly known as purple beard orchid or purplish beard orchid, is a species of orchid native to Australia and New Zealand. It has a single dark green leaf and up to nine green to brown flowers with reddish or purplish stripes. The labellum has a glossy purple, mauve, or bronze-coloured beard with a ridge between the "eye" spots.

== Description ==
Calochilus robertsonii is a terrestrial, perennial, deciduous, herb with an underground tuber and a single fleshy, dark green, linear to lance-shaped leaf which is 150–400 mm (6–20 in) long and 8–12 mm (0.3–0.5 in) wide. Unlike some others in the genus, the leaf is fully developed at flowering time. Up to nine green to brown flowers with reddish or purplish stripes are borne on a flowering stem 150–450 mm (6–20 in) tall. The dorsal sepal is 12–15 mm (0.5–0.6 in) long, 8–11 mm (0.3–0.4 in) wide and the lateral sepals are a similar length but narrower. The petals are 7–9 mm (0.3–0.4 in) long and 5–6 mm (0.20–0.24 in) wide. The labellum is flat, 20–35 mm (0.8–1 in) long, 6–8 mm (0.24–0.31 in) wide, with short, purplish calli near its base. The middle section of the labellum has coarse, mauve, purple or bronze-coloured hairs up to 5 mm (0.2 in) and the tip has a glandular "tail" 5–10 mm (0.2–0.4 in) long and about 1 mm (0.04 in) wide. The column has two purple sham "eyes" joined by a distinct ridge. Flowering occurs from August to early December.

== Taxonomy and naming ==
Calochilus robertsonii was first formally described in 1873 by George Bentham and the description was published in Volume 6 of Flora Australiensis. The specific epithet (robertsonii) honours John George Robertson (1803–1862) who collected the type specimen.

== Distribution and habitat ==
Purplish beard orchid is widespread and common in eastern Australia where it grows in a range of habitats from heath to forest and scrubland and from coast to mountains. It is found in Queensland south from Gympie, from coastal districts and inland as far as Condobolin in New South Wales, throughout most of Victoria and in South Australia, the Australian Capital Territory, and Tasmania. In New Zealand, C. robertsonii only occurs on the North Island although a single specimen was collected on the northern tip of the South Island in 1965.
