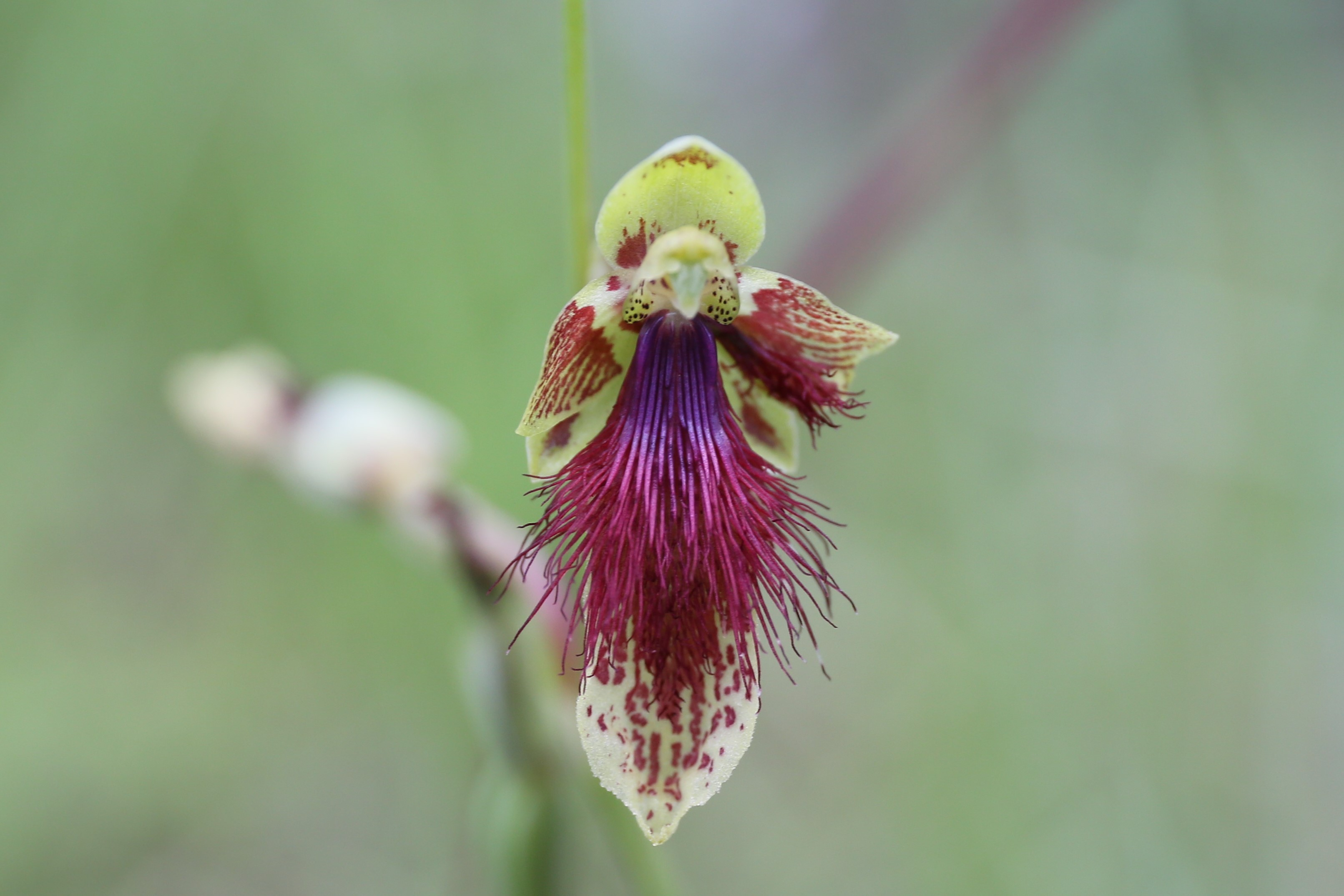
- In the Tablelands Region of far north Queensland

Scientific classification
- Kingdom: Plantae
- Clade: Tracheophytes
- Clade: Angiosperms
- Clade: Monocots
- Order: Asparagales
- Family: Orchidaceae
- Subfamily: Orchidoideae
- Tribe: Diurideae
- Genus: Calochilus
- Species: C. caeruleus

Binomial name
- Calochilus caeruleus L.O.Williams

= Calochilus caeruleus =

Wiry beard orchid

Species of orchid

Calochilus caeruleus, commonly known as wiry beard orchid, is a species of orchid native to northern Australia and New Guinea. It has a single leaf which continues to develop during flowering and up to twelve greenish flowers with reddish brown markings and a labellum with a red "beard".

== Description ==
Calochilus caeruleus is a terrestrial, perennial, deciduous, herb with an underground tuber and a single leaf which is only partly developed at flowering time but is 300–400 mm (10–20 in) long and 6–8 mm (0.2–0.3 in) wide when fully mature. Between four and twelve short-lived greenish flowers with reddish brown markings, 18–22 mm (0.7–0.9 in) long and 12–15 mm (0.5–0.6 in) wide are borne on a thin, wiry flowering stem 500–800 mm (20–30 in) tall. The dorsal sepal is 6–7 mm (0.2–0.3 in) long and 5–6 mm (0.20–0.24 in) wide. The lateral sepals are a similar length but narrower. The petals are 6–6.5 mm (0.24–0.26 in) long and 3–4 mm (0.1–0.2 in) wide. The labellum is flat, 14–16 mm (0.55–0.63 in) long and 7–12 mm (0.3–0.5 in) wide. The base of the labellum has purple calli and two purple plates. The middle section has stiff red hairs up to 5 mm (0.2 in) long and the tip is hairless. The column lacks the sham "eyes" of most other beard orchids. Flowering occurs from December to January but each flower only lasts one or two days.

== Taxonomy and naming ==
Calochilus caeruleus was first formally described in 1946 by Louis Otho Williams and the description was published in Botanical Museum Leaflets from specimens collected near Tarara on the Wassi Kussa River in the west of Papua New Guinea. The specific epithet (caeruleus) is a Latin word meaning "sky blue".

== Distribution and habitat ==
Wiry beard orchid grows in swamps, wet forests, heath and woodland in New Guinea, the Northern Territory including Melville Island and in Tropical North Queensland as far south as Cardwell.
