= Calochilus sandrae =

Brownish beard orchid

Scientific classification
- Kingdom: Plantae
- Clade: Tracheophytes
- Clade: Angiosperms
- Clade: Monocots
- Order: Asparagales
- Family: Orchidaceae
- Subfamily: Orchidoideae
- Tribe: Diurideae
- Genus: Calochilus
- Species: C. sandrae

Binomial name
- Calochilus sandrae D.L.Jones

Species of orchid

Calochilus sandrae, commonly known as the brownish beard orchid, is a species of orchid endemic to the higher parts of southern New South Wales. It has a single greenish brown leaf with a reddish base and up to five brownish green flowers with red striations and a labellum with a brownish purple "beard".

== Description ==
Calochilus sandrae is a terrestrial, perennial, deciduous, herb with an underground tuber and a single greenish brown, linear to lance-shaped leaf 120–200 mm (5–8 in) long and 8–12 mm (0.3–0.5 in) wide with a reddish base. The leaf is fully developed at flowering time. Up to five brownish green flowers with red striations, 20–25 mm (0.8–1 in) long and 12–15 mm (0.5–0.6 in) wide are borne on a flowering stem 300–400 mm (10–20 in) tall. Individual flowers last for between two and five days. The dorsal sepal is egg-shaped to lance-shaped, 10–13 mm (0.4–0.5 in) long and 7–8 mm (0.28–0.31 in) wide. The lateral sepals are a similar length but narrower and spread apart from each other. The petals are 7–8 mm (0.28–0.31 in) long, 5–6 mm (0.20–0.24 in) wide, asymmetrically egg-shaped with a small hooked tip. The labellum is flat, 18–22 mm (0.7–0.9 in) long, 7–9 mm (0.28–0.35 in) wide, with short, thick purple calli near its base. The central part of the labellum is covered with purple hairs up to 5 mm (0.2 in) long and there is a glandular tip which is 2–3 mm (0.08–0.1 in) long. The column has two yellowish "eyes" joined by a purplish ridge. Flowering occurs from December to January.

== Taxonomy and naming ==
Calochilus sandrae was first formally described in 2006 by David Jones from a specimen he collected near Nimmitabel and the description was published in Australian Orchid Research. The specific epithet (sandrae) honours Sandra Raelene Jones who discovered the species.

== Distribution and habitat ==
The brownish beard orchid grows in shrubby montane forest between Nimmitabel and the Wadbilliga National Park in New South Wales and in the Namadgi National Park in the Australian Capital Territory.
