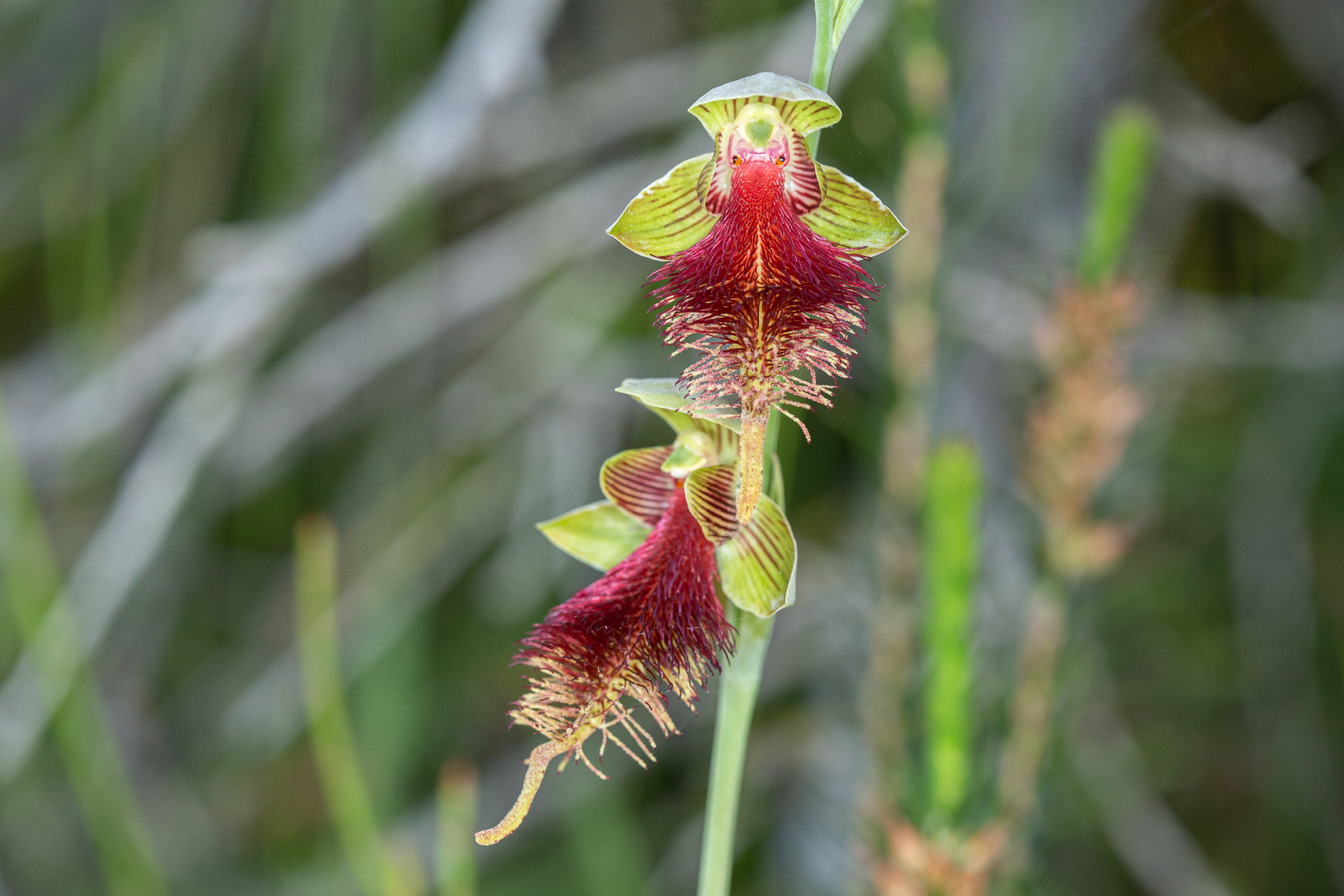

Scientific classification
- Kingdom: Plantae
- Clade: Tracheophytes
- Clade: Angiosperms
- Clade: Monocots
- Order: Asparagales
- Family: Orchidaceae
- Subfamily: Orchidoideae
- Tribe: Diurideae
- Genus: Calochilus
- Species: C. grandiflorus

Binomial name
- Calochilus grandiflorus (Benth.) Domin

Synonyms
- Calochilus campestris var. grandiflorus Benth.

= Calochilus grandiflorus =

Giant beard orchid

Species of orchid

Calochilus grandiflorus, commonly known as the giant beard orchid or golden beard orchid, is a species of orchid endemic to eastern Australia. It has a single leaf with a reddish base and up to fifteen relatively large golden bronze-coloured flowers with a red or coppery red "beard".

== Description ==
Calochilus grandiflorus is a terrestrial, perennial, deciduous, herb with an underground tuber and a single linear leaf, 30–50 mm (1–2 in) long and 5–8 mm (0.2–0.3 in) wide, usually with a reddish base. The leaf is fully developed when the first flower opens. Up to fifteen golden bronze-coloured flowers 35–45 mm (1–2 in) long and 22–28 mm (0.9–1 in) wide are borne on a wiry flowering stem 300–600 mm (10–20 in) tall. The dorsal sepal is 15–18 mm (0.6–0.7 in) long and 9–12 mm (0.4–0.5 in) wide. The lateral sepals are a similar length but narrower. The petals are 8–10 mm (0.3–0.4 in) long and about 8 mm (0.3 in) wide. The labellum is flat, 35–40 mm (1.4–1.6 in) long and 8–10 mm (0.3–0.4 in) wide with thin red calli near its base. The middle section of the labellum has coarse coppery red or yellowish hairs up to 11 mm (0.4 in) and the tip has a glandular "tail" up to 22 mm (0.87 in) long. The column has two purple coloured "eyes" but there is no ridge between the eyes. Flowering occurs from September to December.

== Taxonomy ==
The giant beard orchid was first formally described in 1873 by George Bentham who gave it the name Calochilus campestris var. grandiflorus and published the description in Flora Australiensis. In 1915 Karel Domin raised the variety to species status. The specific epithet (grandiflorus) is derived from the Latin words grandis meaning "large", "great", "noble", "sublime" or "magnificent" and flos meaning "flower".

== Distribution and habitat ==
Calochilus grandiflorus grows in near-coastal heath, sometimes on nearby mountains in New South Wales north from Bulahdelah and in southeastern Queensland.
