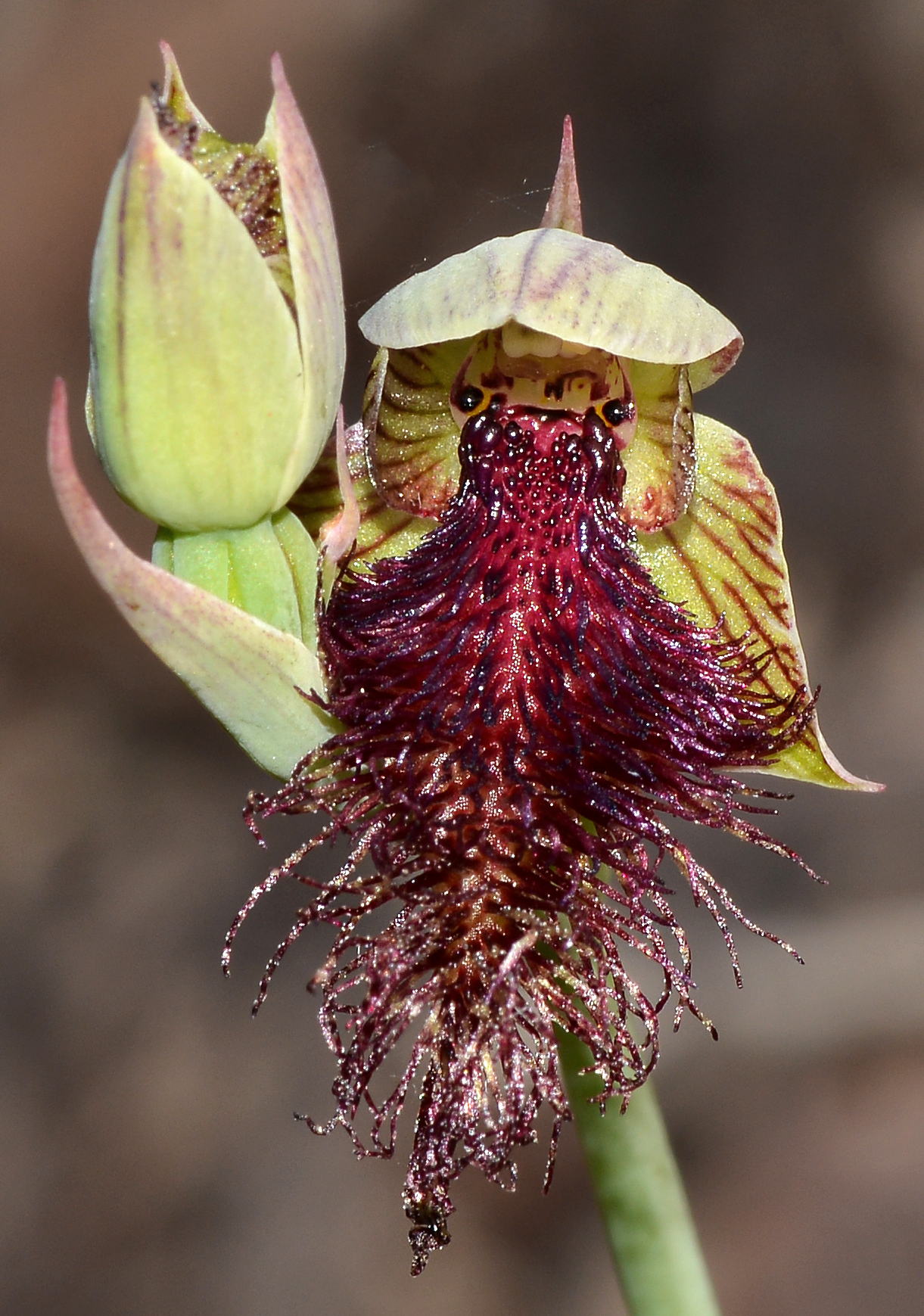
- Calochilus stramenicola in Wandoo National Park

Scientific classification
- Kingdom: Plantae
- Clade: Tracheophytes
- Clade: Angiosperms
- Clade: Monocots
- Order: Asparagales
- Family: Orchidaceae
- Subfamily: Orchidoideae
- Tribe: Diurideae
- Genus: Calochilus
- Species: C. stramenicola

Binomial name
- Calochilus stramenicola D.L.Jones

= Calochilus stramenicola =

Wandoo beard orchid

Species of orchid

Calochilus stramenicola, commonly known as the wandoo beard orchid, is a species of orchid endemic to Western Australia. It has a single smooth, erect leaf and up to seven dull greenish flowers with reddish brown or purplish stripes. The labellum has a purplish beard with a ridge between two "eye" spots.

== Description ==
Calochilus stramenicola is a terrestrial, perennial, deciduous, herb with an underground tuber and a single smooth erect, linear to lance-shaped, dark green leaf, 80–200 mm (3–8 in) long and 3–5 mm (0.1–0.2 in) wide and which is fully developed when the first flower opens. Up to seven dull greenish flowers with reddish brown or purplish stripes are borne on a flowering stem 120–420 mm (5–20 in) tall. The dorsal sepal is 7–10 mm (0.3–0.4 in) long and 6–8 mm (0.2–0.3 in) wide and the lateral sepals are a similar length but narrower. The petals are 4–5 mm (0.16–0.20 in) long and 3–4 mm (0.1–0.2 in) wide. The labellum is flat, 12–17 mm (0.5–0.7 in) long and 6–8 mm (0.2–0.3 in) wide with short, reddish purple calli near its base. The middle section of the labellum has thin hairs up to 3 mm (0.1 in) long and the tip has a glandular "tail" 2–3 mm (0.08–0.1 in) long and about 1 mm (0.04 in) wide. The column has two dark coloured "eyes" joined by a ridge. Flowering occurs in September and October.

== Taxonomy and naming ==
Calochilus stramenicola was first formally described in 2006 by David Jones and the description was published in Australian Orchid Research. The specific epithet (stramenicola) is derived from the Latin word stramen meaning "straw", "litter" or "any material for bedding down" with the suffix -cola meaning "dweller", referring to the preference of this species for growing in accumulations of litter.

== Distribution and habitat ==
The wandoo beard orchid grows in thick accumulations of litter in wandoo woodland. It is found in a narrow band between Narrogin and Wannamal in the Avon Wheatbelt, Jarrah Forest and Swan Coastal Plain biogeographic regions.
