= Calochilus metallicus =

Metallic beard orchid

Scientific classification
- Kingdom: Plantae
- Clade: Tracheophytes
- Clade: Angiosperms
- Clade: Monocots
- Order: Asparagales
- Family: Orchidaceae
- Subfamily: Orchidoideae
- Tribe: Diurideae
- Genus: Calochilus
- Species: C. metallicus

Binomial name
- Calochilus metallicus D.L.Jones

Species of orchid

Calochilus metallicus, commonly known as metallic beard orchid, is a species of orchid endemic to Tropical Queensland. It has a single dark green leaf and up to four pale green flowers with a pinkish or reddish "beard" on the labellum.

== Description ==
Calochilus metallicus is a terrestrial, perennial, deciduous, herb with an underground tuber and a single dark green leaf which is only partially developed at flowering time, 80–180 mm (3–7 in) long, 3–4 mm (0.1–0.2 in) wide when fully developed. Up to four pale green flowers with darker markings, 13–16 mm (0.5–0.6 in) long and 7–9 mm (0.3–0.4 in) wide are borne on a flowering stem 200–300 mm (8–10 in) tall. The dorsal sepal is 5–6 mm (0.20–0.24 in) long and about 5 mm (0.2 in) wide. The lateral sepals are a similar length but about narrower. The petals are about 6 mm (0.2 in) long and 2 mm (0.08 in) wide. The labellum is flat, 12–14 mm (0.5–0.6 in) long, about 5 mm (0.2 in) wide and green with red markings. The labellum is mostly covered with thin, metallic hairs 2–3 mm (0.08–0.1 in) long, except for the tip which is hairless. Flowering occurs from December to February but each flower only lasts only a few hours.

== Taxonomy and naming ==
Calochilus metallicus was first formally described in 2004 by David Jones and the description was published in The Orchadian from specimens collected near the Wenlock River. The specific epithet (metallicus) is derived from the Ancient Greek word metallon.

== Distribution and habitat ==
Metallic beard orchid grows with grasses in low lying places on Cape York and on islands in the Torres Strait including Moa Island.
