= Calochilus imperiosus =

Imperial beard orchid

Scientific classification
- Kingdom: Plantae
- Clade: Tracheophytes
- Clade: Angiosperms
- Clade: Monocots
- Order: Asparagales
- Family: Orchidaceae
- Subfamily: Orchidoideae
- Tribe: Diurideae
- Genus: Calochilus
- Species: C. imperiosus

Binomial name
- Calochilus imperiosus D.L.Jones

Species of orchid

Calochilus imperiosus, commonly known as the imperial beard orchid, is a species of orchid endemic to northern Australia. It has a single leaf and up to fifteen dull green flowers with red or purple markings and a labellum with a pinkish red "beard".

== Description ==
Calochilus imperiosus is a terrestrial, perennial, deciduous, herb with an underground tuber and a single leaf which is half developed at flowering time, 350–580 mm (10–20 in) long, 15–22 mm (0.6–0.9 in) wide when fully developed. Between five and fifteen dull green flowers with red or purple markings, 25–28 mm (0.98–1.1 in) long and 15–18 mm (0.6–0.7 in) wide are borne on a flowering stem 400–700 mm (20–30 in) tall. The dorsal sepal is 10–12 mm (0.4–0.5 in) long and about 8 mm (0.3 in) wide. The lateral sepals are a similar length but about 5 mm (0.2 in) wide. The petals are 9–10 mm (0.35–0.39 in) long and about 4 mm (0.2 in) wide. The labellum curves downwards and is 20–22 mm (0.8–0.9 in) long and about 9 mm (0.4 in) wide. The base of the labellum has glossy purple calli and two purple ridges. The middle section has pinkish red hairs up to 5 mm (0.2 in) long and there is a narrow tip about 3 mm (0.1 in) long. Flowering occurs from December to February but each flower only lasts two to four days.

== Taxonomy and naming ==
Calochilus imperiosus was first formally described in 2004 by David Jones and the description was published in The Orchadian from specimens collected south of Cooktown. The specific epithet (imperiosus) is a Latin word meaning "possessed of command", "mighty" or "domineering".

== Distribution and habitat ==
The imperial beard orchid grows in grassland and grassy woodland or forest between Cooktown and Herberton in north Queensland and near Kapalga in Kakadu National Park.
