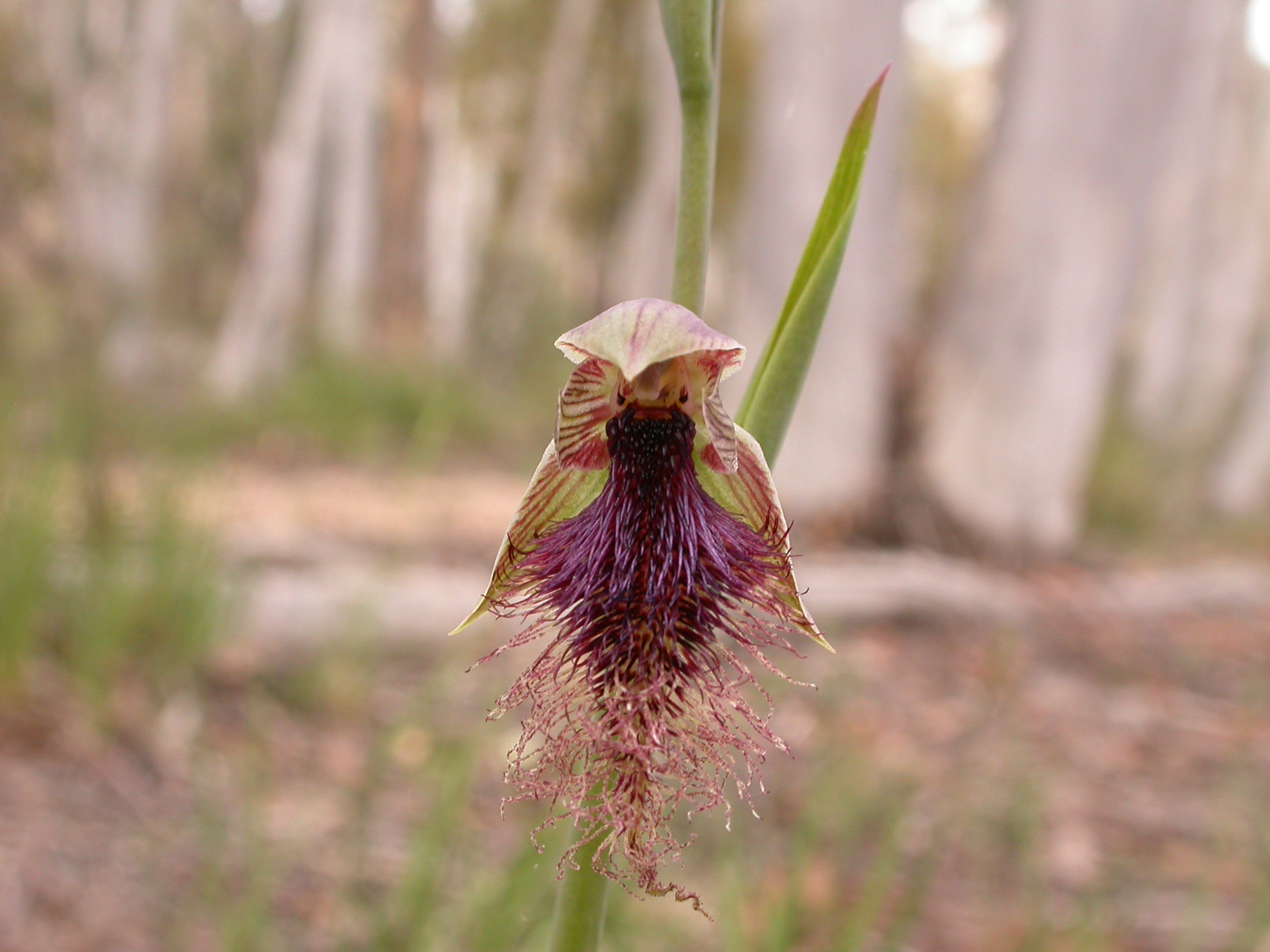
- Calochilus platychilus on Black Mountain in the A.C.T.

Scientific classification
- Kingdom: Plantae
- Clade: Tracheophytes
- Clade: Angiosperms
- Clade: Monocots
- Order: Asparagales
- Family: Orchidaceae
- Subfamily: Orchidoideae
- Tribe: Diurideae
- Subtribe: Thelymitrinae
- Genus: Calochilus; R.Br.

= Calochilus =

Beard orchid

Genus of orchids

Calochilus, commonly known as beard orchids, is a genus of about 30 species of plants in the orchid family, Orchidaceae. Beard orchids are terrestrial herbs with a single leaf at the base of the plant, or no leaves. Their most striking feature is a densely hairy labellum, giving rise to their common name. Beard orchids, unlike some other Australian orchids, do not reproduce using daughter tubers, but self-pollinate when cross-pollination has not occurred. Most species occur in Australia but some are found in New Zealand, New Guinea and New Caledonia.

== Description ==
Orchids in the genus Calochilus are terrestrial, perennial, deciduous, sympodial herbs with a few inconspicuous, fine roots and a pair of egg-shaped tubers lacking a protective fibrous sheath. The tubers produce replacement tubers on the end of a short, root-like stolons. There is either a single, linear, fleshy, convolute leaf, usually channelled, sometimes triangular in cross section, or there is no leaf.

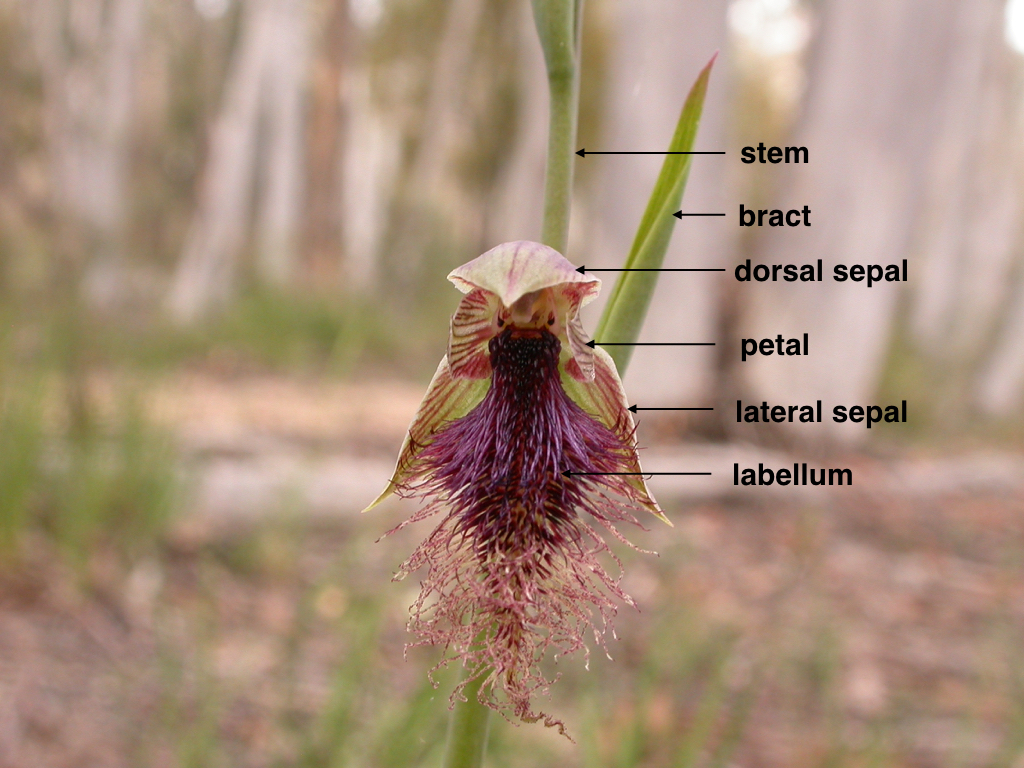
labelled image

The inflorescence is a raceme with from one to many resupinate flowers. The flowering stem usually has sheathing bracts, which often appear leaf-like. The dorsal sepal is broad, erect, dished and often forms a horizontal hood over the column. The lateral sepals are similar to, but usually narrower than the dorsal sepal. The petals are shorter and narrower than the sepals and often have a hook-like tip. As is usual in orchids, one petal is highly modified as the central labellum. The labellum is longer than all the other parts of the flower, oblong near its base, triangular near the tip and densely covered with purple or metallic-coloured hairs, short near the base of the labellum increasing in length towards its tip. The sexual parts of the flower are fused to the column, which is short and broad with broad wings on its sides. The base of the column forms two rounded collars around the stigma, each often with an eye-like spot. Flowering time depends on the climatic region where the species is found and the fruit that follows flowering is a non-fleshy, dehiscent capsule containing up to 500 seeds.

== Taxonomy and naming ==
The genus Calochilus was first formally described by Robert Brown in 1810 and the description was published in Prodromus Florae Novae Hollandiae. Brown described two species, C. campestris and C. paludosus, but did not nominate a type species. The name Calochilus is said to be derived from the Latin words calos meaning 'beautiful' and chilus meaning 'lip' referring to the bearded labellum. In classical Latin, pulcher and labium are the words for 'beautiful' and 'lip'. In ancient Greek, kalos (καλός) and cheilos (χεῖλος) are used for 'beautiful' and 'lip'.

== Distribution and habitat ==
There are about thirty species of beard orchid. One species is endemic to New Caledonia with the remainder occurring in Australia, although three also occur in New Zealand and one also in New Guinea. Beard orchids are found in all Australian states. In temperate Australia and in New Zealand they grow on slopes and ridges in forest, woodland, shrubland, heath and wet swamps; in tropical Australia and New Guinea in wet, grassy areas. The New Caledonian species, Calochilus neocalidonium grows in maquis shrubland on rocky soils.

== Ecology ==
In tropical regions, Calochilus species complete their life cycle before the start of the dry season but in more temperate areas they grow in autumn and winter and when the leaves are fully developed they flower in spring and early summer. There have been few studies on the pollination of beard orchids but male Campsomeris wasps have been observed collecting pollinia from some flowers while attempting to copulate with the labellum. In all species, the anther is directly above the stigma, so that if the flower is not cross pollinated, the pollinia fall or crumple onto it.

== Species list ==
Species accepted as of July 2018:

- Calochilus ammobius D.L.Jones & B.Gray - sand beard orchid (Qld.)
- Calochilus caeruleus L.O.Williams - wiry beard orchid (New Guinea, Qld., N.T.)
- Calochilus caesius D.L.Jones - blue beard orchid (N.T.)
- Calochilus campestris R.Br. - copper beard orchid (Qld., N.S.W., Vic., S.A., Tas.)
- Calochilus cleistanthus D.L.Jones - pallid beard orchid (Qld)
- Calochilus gracillimus Rupp - late beard orchid, slender beard orchid (Qld., N.S.W.)
- Calochilus grandiflorus (Benth.) Domin - golden beard orchid, giant beard orchid (Qld., N.S.W.)
- Calochilus herbaceus Lindl. - pale beard orchid (N.S.W., S.A., Tas. North Island of New Zealand)
- Calochilus holtzei F.Muell. - ghostly beard orchid (N.T., W.A.)
- Calochilus imperiosus D.L.Jones - imperial beard orchid (Qld., N.T.)
- Calochilus kalaru D.L.Jones - (N.S.W.)
- Calochilus metallicus D.L.Jones - metallic beard orchid (Qld.)
- Calochilus montanus D.L.Jones - mountain beard orchid (N.S.W.)
- Calochilus neocaledonicus Schltr. - New Caledonia
- Calochilus paludosus R.Br. - red beard orchid, red beardie (Qld., N.S.W., Vic., S.A., Tas. North Island of N.Z.)
- Calochilus platychilus D.L.Jones - purple beard orchid (N.S.W.)
- Calochilus praealtus D.L.Jones - lofty beard (N.S.W.)
- Calochilus pruinosus D.L.Jones - mallee beard orchid (W.A.)
- Calochilus psednus D.L.Jones & Lavarack - Cardwell beard orchid (Qld.)
- Calochilus pulchellus D.L.Jones - pretty beard orchid (N.S.W.)
- Calochilus richiae Nicholls - bald-tip beard orchid (Vic.)
- Calochilus robertsonii Benth. - purple beard orchid, purplish beard orchid (Qld., N.S.W., Vic., S.A., Tas., W.A. N.Z.)
- Calochilus russeus D.L.Jones - reddish beard orchid (N.S.W.)
- Calochilus sandrae D.L.Jones - brownish beard orchid (N.S.W.)
- Calochilus stramenicola D.L.Jones - wandoo beard orchid (W.A.)
- Calochilus therophilus D.L.Jones - late beard orchid (Qld., N.S.W., A.C.T., Vic., Tas.)
- Calochilus uliginosus D.L.Jones - swamp beard orchid (W.A.)

== See also ==
- List of Orchidaceae genera
