= Calochilus caesius =

Blue beard orchid

Scientific classification
- Kingdom: Plantae
- Clade: Tracheophytes
- Clade: Angiosperms
- Clade: Monocots
- Order: Asparagales
- Family: Orchidaceae
- Subfamily: Orchidoideae
- Tribe: Diurideae
- Genus: Calochilus
- Species: C. caesius

Binomial name
- Calochilus caesius D.L.Jones

Species of orchid

Calochilus caesius, commonly known as the blue beard orchid, is a species of orchid endemic to the Northern Territory in Australia. It has a single leaf which is not present during flowering and up to five pale green, very short-lived flowers with a bluish-red "beard".

== Description ==
Calochilus caesius is a terrestrial, perennial, deciduous, herb with an underground tuber and a single leaf 100–200 mm (4–8 in) long and 3–5 mm (0.1–0.2 in) wide but which is not present during flowering. Up to five pale green flowers 12–15 mm (0.5–0.6 in) long and 10–12 mm (0.4–0.5 in) wide are borne on a thin, wiry flowering stem 200–400 mm (8–20 in) tall. The dorsal sepal is 5–6 mm (0.20–0.24 in) long and 3–4 mm (0.1–0.2 in) wide. The lateral sepals are 6–7 mm (0.2–0.3 in) long and about 4 mm (0.2 in) wide. The petals are 5–6 mm (0.20–0.24 in) long and 1.5–2.5 mm (0.06–0.1 in) wide. The labellum is flat, pale green and red, 12–13 mm (0.47–0.51 in) long and 3.5–5.5 mm (0.1–0.2 in) wide with bluish red hairs up to 2 mm (0.08 in) covering about three quarters of the labellum. The column lacks the sham "eyes" of some other beard orchids. Flowering occurs from December to February but each flower only lasts a few hours.

== Taxonomy and naming ==
Calochilus caesius was first formally described in 2004 by David Jones and the description was published in The Orchadian from specimens collected at Yarrawonga Swamp near Darwin. The specific epithet (caesius) is a Latin word meaning "bluish gray".

== Distribution and habitat ==
The blue beard orchid grows in swampy places with rushes and sedges in the far north of the Northern Territory including Garig Gunak Barlu National Park, Kakadu National Park and Melville Island.
