= Calochilus cleistanthus =

Pallid beard orchid

Scientific classification
- Kingdom: Plantae
- Clade: Tracheophytes
- Clade: Angiosperms
- Clade: Monocots
- Order: Asparagales
- Family: Orchidaceae
- Subfamily: Orchidoideae
- Tribe: Diurideae
- Genus: Calochilus
- Species: C. cleistanthus

Binomial name
- Calochilus cleistanthus D.L.Jones

Species of orchid

Calochilus cleistanthus, commonly known as the pallid beard orchid, is a species of orchid endemic to Queensland. It has up to four small, pale green to yellowish green flowers which remain closed and the plant is apparently leafless. It is only known from a single location on the Cape York Peninsula.

== Description ==
Calochilus cleistanthus is a terrestrial, perennial, deciduous, herb with an underground tuber but is apparently leafless. Up to four pale green to yellowish green flowers 6–7 mm (0.2–0.3 in) long and 4–6 mm (0.16–0.24 in) wide are borne on a very thin, wiry, yellowish green flowering stem 150–400 mm (6–20 in) tall. The flowers do not open, but are held horizontally for about one day, then become erect. The dorsal sepal is about 6 mm (0.2 in) long and 5 mm (0.2 in) wide and the lateral sepals are about 7 mm (0.3 in) long and 3 mm (0.1 in) wide. The petals are about 5 mm (0.2 in) long and 2 mm (0.08 in) wide. Unlike most others in the genus, the labellum lacks a "beard" and sham "eyes". The flowers appear from December to January.

== Taxonomy and naming ==
Calochilus cleistanthus was first formally described in 2004 by David Jones and the description was published in The Orchadian from specimens collected on Cape York. The specific epithet (cleistanthus) is derived from the Ancient Greek words kleistos meaning "shut" or "closed" and anthos meaning "flower".

== Distribution and habitat ==
The pallid beard orchid grows in swampy places with rushes and sedges in woodland and is only known from the type location.
