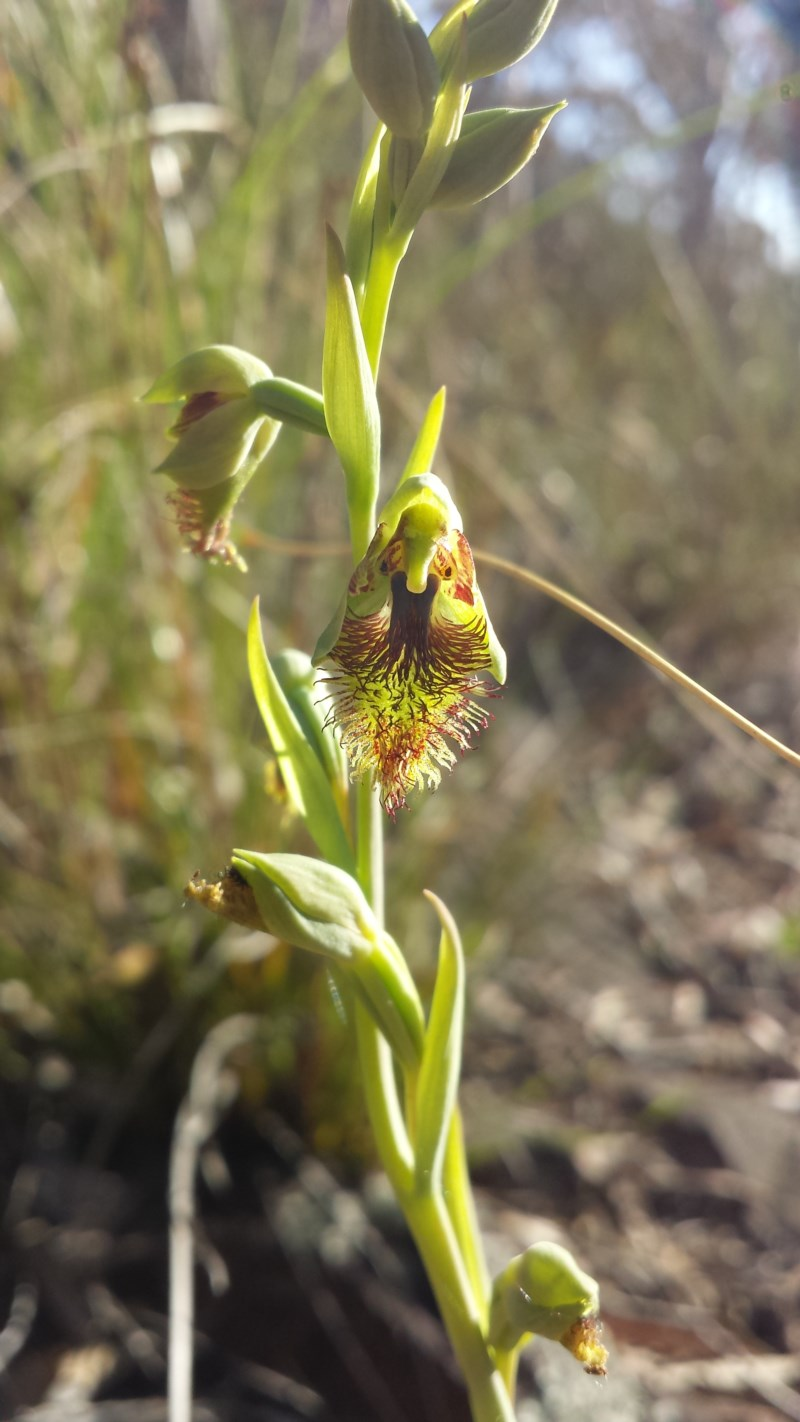
- Calochilus montanus on Black Mountain in the A.C.T.

Scientific classification
- Kingdom: Plantae
- Clade: Tracheophytes
- Clade: Angiosperms
- Clade: Monocots
- Order: Asparagales
- Family: Orchidaceae
- Subfamily: Orchidoideae
- Tribe: Diurideae
- Genus: Calochilus
- Species: C. montanus

Binomial name
- Calochilus montanus D.L.Jones

= Calochilus montanus =

Mountain beard orchid

Species of orchid

Calochilus montanus, commonly known as mountain beard orchid, is a species of orchid endemic to New South Wales and the Australian Capital Territory. It has a single fleshy, channelled, dark green leaf and up to fifteen green flowers with reddish lines. The labellum has two shiny metallic blue to purple plates near its base and there is no ridge between the two "eyes" on the column.

== Description ==
Calochilus montanus is a terrestrial, perennial, deciduous, herb with an underground tuber and a single fleshy, channelled, dark green, linear to lance-shaped leaf, 150–250 mm (6–10 in) long and 7–15 mm (0.3–0.6 in) wide. The leaf is fully developed when the first flower opens. Between two and fifteen green flowers with reddish lines are borne on a flowering stem 400–900 mm (20–40 in) tall. The dorsal sepal is more or less erect, 9–12 mm (0.4–0.5 in) long and 4–6 mm (0.16–0.24 in) wide. The lateral sepals are a similar length but narrower. The petals are 5–7 mm (0.2–0.3 in) long and 3–4 mm (0.1–0.2 in) wide. The labellum curves forwards and is 11–15 mm (0.4–0.6 in) long and 5–6 mm (0.20–0.24 in) wide with two shiny metallic blue to purple plates near its base. The middle part of the labellum has bristly hairs up to 4 mm (0.2 in) and the tip has a glandular "tail" 3–4 mm (0.12–0.16 in) long. The column has two purple "eyes" but lacks a ridge between them. Flowering occurs from October to December.

== Taxonomy and naming ==
Calochilus montanus was first formally described in 2006 by David Jones and the description was published in Australian Orchid Research from a specimen collected on Black Mountain in the Australian Capital Territory. The specific epithet (montanus) is a Latin word meaning "of mountains", referring to the habitat of this species.

== Distribution and habitat ==
The mountain beard orchid grows in open forest on mountain slopes. It occurs in the Australian Capital Territory and in New South Wales south from the Moonbi Range.
