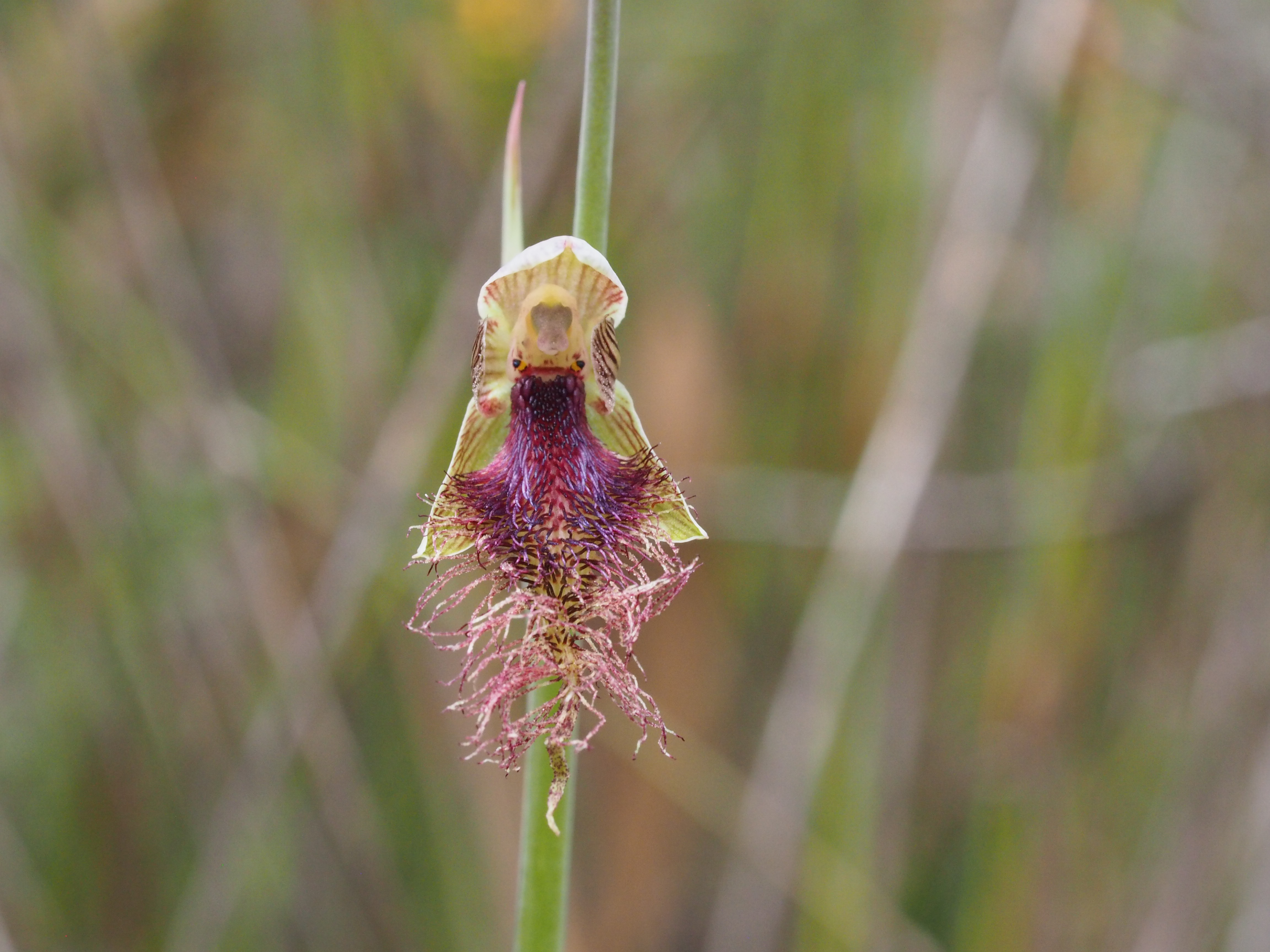
- Calochilus russeus in Cathedral Rock National Park

Scientific classification
- Kingdom: Plantae
- Clade: Tracheophytes
- Clade: Angiosperms
- Clade: Monocots
- Order: Asparagales
- Family: Orchidaceae
- Subfamily: Orchidoideae
- Tribe: Diurideae
- Genus: Calochilus
- Species: C. russeus

Binomial name
- Calochilus russeus D.L.Jones

= Calochilus russeus =

Reddish beard orchid

Species of orchid

Calochilus russeus, commonly known as the reddish beard orchid, is a species of orchid endemic to the Northern Tablelands of New South Wales. It has a single thick, dark green leaf and up to twelve greenish flowers with red stripes and a hairy labellum which is the largest part of the flower. It is a rare orchid, growing as isolated individuals near Ebor.

== Description ==
Calochilus russeus is a terrestrial, perennial, deciduous, herb with an underground tuber and a single thick, dark green, channelled leaf 250–350 mm (9.8–14 in) long and 12–18 mm (0.5–0.7 in) wide. Unlike some others in the genus, the leaf is fully developed at flowering time. Between four and twelve greenish flowers with red stripes are borne on a flowering stem 400–700 mm (20–30 in) tall. Individual flowers last for between two and five days. The dorsal sepal is 12–14 mm (0.5–0.6 in) long, 8–10 mm (0.3–0.4 in) wide and forms a hood over the rest of the column. The lateral sepals are 12 mm (0.5 in) long, about 5 mm (0.2 in) wide and spread apart from each other behind the labellum. The petals are 8–9 mm (0.3–0.4 in) long, about 5 mm (0.2 in) wide, asymmetrically shaped, have a hooked tip and curve forwards partly surrounding the column and upper labellum. The labellum is 25–30 mm (0.98–1.2 in) long, 9–11 mm (0.35–0.43 in) wide, with short, thick red calli near its base, thick hairs up to 8 mm (0.3 in) long near its middle and a glandular tip which is 16–18 mm (0.6–0.7 in) long and about 4 mm (0.2 in) wide. The column has two purple "eyes". Flowering occurs from December to February.

== Taxonomy and naming ==
Calochilus russeus was first formally described in 2004 by David Jones from a specimen collected near the road between Guyra and Ebor and the description was published in The Orchadian. The specific epithet (russeus) is a Latin word meaning "reddish".

== Distribution and habitat ==
The reddish beard orchid grows with bracken, grasses and low shrubs in peppermint forest near Ebor. It occurs as scattered individuals in relatively low numbers, including in Cathedral Rock National Park.
