= Calochilus pulchellus =

Pretty beard orchid

Scientific classification
- Kingdom: Plantae
- Clade: Tracheophytes
- Clade: Angiosperms
- Clade: Monocots
- Order: Asparagales
- Family: Orchidaceae
- Subfamily: Orchidoideae
- Tribe: Diurideae
- Genus: Calochilus
- Species: C. pulchellus

Binomial name
- Calochilus pulchellus D.L.Jones

Species of orchid

Calochilus pulchellus, commonly known as the pretty beard orchid, is a species of orchid endemic to the south coast of New South Wales. It has a single dark green leaf with a dark red base and up to five pale green to greenish yellow flowers with red striations and a labellum with a coppery red "beard". Fewer than thirty plants growing in three sites are known.

== Description ==
Calochilus pulchellus is a terrestrial, perennial, deciduous, herb with an underground tuber and a single dark green, linear to lance-shaped leaf 100–180 mm (4–7 in) long and 4–8 mm (0.2–0.3 in) wide with a dark red base. The leaf is fully developed at flowering time. Up to five pale green to greenish yellow flowers with red stripes are borne on a flowering stem 200–300 mm (8–10 in) tall. Individual flowers last for between two and four days. The dorsal sepal is broad elliptical, 13–16 mm (0.5–0.6 in) long and 8–9 mm (0.3–0.4 in) wide. The lateral sepals are a similar length but narrower and spread apart from each other. The petals are 8–9 mm (0.31–0.35 in) long, 5–6 mm (0.20–0.24 in) wide, asymmetrically egg-shaped with a small upturned tip. The labellum is flat, 28–30 mm (1.1–1.2 in) long, 6–7 mm (0.24–0.28 in) wide, with short red calli near its base. The central part of the labellum is covered with coppery red hairs up to 6 mm (0.2 in) long and there is a glandular tip which is 12–17 mm (0.5–0.7 in) long. The column has two blackish "eyes" without a ridge between them. Flowering occurs from October to November but each flower only last between two and four days.

== Taxonomy and naming ==
Calochilus pulchellus was first formally described in 2006 by David Jones from a specimen collected in the Morton National Park and the description was published in Australian Orchid Research. The specific epithet (pulchellus) is the diminutive form of the Latin word pulcher meaning "pretty", hence "pretty little", referring to the flowers of this species.

== Distribution and habitat ==
The pretty beard orchid grows in low heath. It is only known from three sites in the Shoalhaven district.

== Conservation ==
This orchid is listed as "endangered" under the New South Wales Biodiversity Conservation Act 2016. The main threat to the species is its small population size.
