= Holmes Jungle Nature Park =

Protected area in the Northern Territory, Australia

- IUCN category V (protected landscape/seascape)
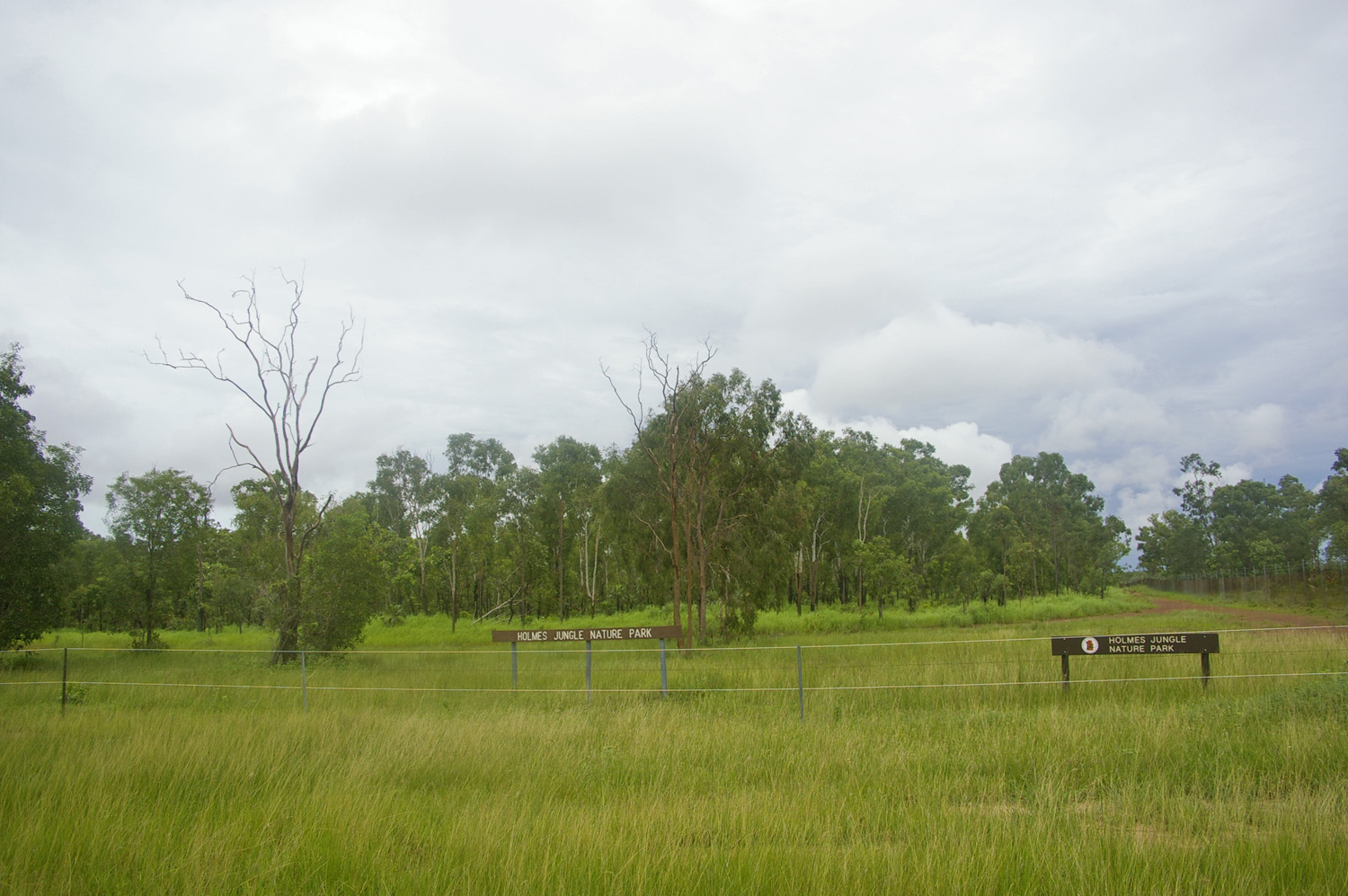
- Holmes Jungle Nature Park

- Location within Northern Territory
- Location: Northern Territory
- Coordinates: 12°24′09″S 130°55′51″E
- Area: 2.51 km^{2} (0.97 sq mi)
- Established: 20 January 1976
- Governing body: Parks and Wildlife Commission of the Northern Territory

Holmes Jungle Nature Park is a protected area in the Northern Territory of Australia consisting of a small, relatively isolated area of monsoon forest at the edge of northern suburbs of the territorial capital of Darwin. It provided a habitat for a large variety of native birds, mammals and reptiles which are able to breed and find refuge in the thick vegetation. The area of the park is approximately 250 hectares and Pine Creek winds its way through the park to its centre. The creek connects up other waterways of the Shoal Bay area and saltwater crocodiles can always be present. The park provides an interesting field trip for locals, young families and visitors.

Once known as "Holtze Jungle" after the Government Gardener Maurice William Holtze who held land in the area, it was renamed "Holmes Jungle" after Felix Holmes, a butcher who once raised cattle in the area.
