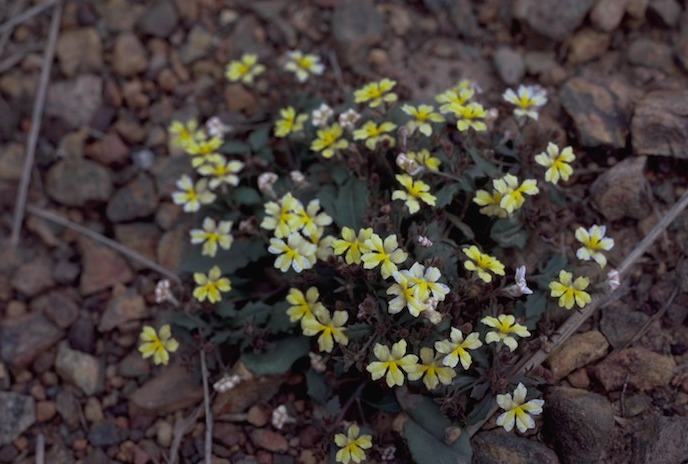
- Near the Mary River

Scientific classification
- Kingdom: Plantae
- Clade: Tracheophytes
- Clade: Angiosperms
- Clade: Eudicots
- Clade: Asterids
- Order: Asterales
- Family: Goodeniaceae
- Genus: Goodenia
- Species: G. holtzeana

Binomial name
- Goodenia holtzeana (Specht) Carolin

Synonyms
- Calogyne holtzeana Specht

= Goodenia holtzeana =

Species of plant

Goodenia holtzeana is a species of flowering plant in the family Goodeniaceae and is endemic to northern parts of the Northern Territory. It is a prostrate to ascending or erect annual plant with egg-shaped to lance-shaped stem-leaves with the narrower end towards the base, and racemes of yellow flowers with brownish markings.

== Description ==
Goodenia holtzeana is a prostrate to ascending or erect herb with stems up to 60 cm (24 in) long. The leaves at the base of the plant are egg-shaped to lance-shaped with the narrower end towards the base, 45–100 mm (1.8–3.9 in) long and 15–30 mm (0.59–1.18 in) wide with teeth on the edges. The stem leaves are smaller and egg-shaped to elliptic. The flowers are arranged in racemes up to 400 mm (16 in) long with leaf-like bracts, each flower on a pedicel 10–25 mm (0.39–0.98 in) long. The sepals are lance-shaped, 4–6 mm (0.16–0.24 in) long, the corolla yellow with brownish markings, 14–20 mm (0.55–0.79 in) long, the lower petal lobes 3–4 mm (0.12–0.16 in) long with wings about 1.5–2 mm (0.059–0.079 in) wide. Flowering occurs from February to June and the fruit is a more or less spherical or oval nut 4–5 mm (0.16–0.20 in) in diameter.

== Taxonomy and naming ==
This species was first formally described in 1958 by Raymond Specht who gave it the name Calogyne holtzeana in the Records of the American-Australian Scientific Expedition to Arnhem Land from specimens collected by Maurice William Holtze near Port Darwin. In 1990 Roger Charles Carolin changed the name to Goodenia holtzeana in the journal Telopea. The specific epithet (holtzeana) honours the collector of the type specimens.

== Distribution and habitat ==
This goodenia grows in forest in arid environments in the Top End region of the Northern Territory.

== Conservation status ==
Goodenia holtzeana is list as of "least concern" under the Northern Territory Government Territory Parks and Wildlife Conservation Act 1976.
