= Calochilus uliginosus =

Swamp beard orchid

Scientific classification
- Kingdom: Plantae
- Clade: Tracheophytes
- Clade: Angiosperms
- Clade: Monocots
- Order: Asparagales
- Family: Orchidaceae
- Subfamily: Orchidoideae
- Tribe: Diurideae
- Genus: Calochilus
- Species: C. uliginosus

Binomial name
- Calochilus uliginosus D.L.Jones

Species of orchid

Calochilus uliginosus, commonly known as the swamp beard orchid, is a species of orchid endemic to Western Australia. It has a single dark green leaf with a reddish purple base and up to seven greenish to brownish flowers with red lines and a labellum with a reddish purple beard.

== Description ==
Calochilus uliginosus is a terrestrial, perennial, deciduous, herb with an underground tuber and a single dark green, linear to lance-shaped leaf, 100–400 mm (4–20 in) long and 5–12 mm (0.2–0.5 in) wide with a reddish purple base and which is fully developed when the first flower opens. Up to seven greenish to brownish flowers with red stripes and blotches, 20–26 mm (0.8–1 in) long and 10–12 mm (0.4–0.5 in) wide are borne on a flowering stem 150–600 mm (6–20 in) tall. The dorsal sepal is oblong to egg-shaped, 9–13 mm (0.4–0.5 in) long and 5–7 mm (0.2–0.3 in) wide and the lateral sepals are a similar length but narrower. The petals are 4–6 mm (0.16–0.24 in) long and about 3 mm (0.1 in) wide. The labellum is flat, 14–18 mm (0.6–0.7 in) long and 6–7 mm (0.2–0.3 in) wide with short, reddish purple calli near its base. The middle section of the labellum has hairs up to 5 mm (0.2 in) long and the tip has a glandular "tail" 2–4 mm (0.08–0.2 in) long and about 1 mm (0.04 in) wide. The column has two purple "eyes" joined by a red ridge. Flowering occurs from October to December.

== Taxonomy and naming ==
Calochilus uliginosus was first formally described in 2006 by David Jones and the description was published in Australian Orchid Research from a specimen collected near Albany. The specific epithet (uliginosus) is derived from a Latin word meaning "marsh" or "swamp", referring to the habitat preference of this species.

== Distribution and habitat ==
The swamp beard orchid grows in dense undergrowth in seasonal swamps between Gingin and Albany in the Jarrah Forest, Swan Coastal Plain and Warren biogeographic regions.
