= Calochilus pruinosus =

Mallee beard orchid

Conservation status
- Declared rare (DEC)

Scientific classification
- Kingdom: Plantae
- Clade: Tracheophytes
- Clade: Angiosperms
- Clade: Monocots
- Order: Asparagales
- Family: Orchidaceae
- Subfamily: Orchidoideae
- Tribe: Diurideae
- Genus: Calochilus
- Species: C. pruinosus

Binomial name
- Calochilus pruinosus D.L.Jones

Species of orchid

Calochilus pruinosus, commonly known as the mallee beard orchid, is a species of orchid endemic to southern continental Australia. It has up to fifteen dull greenish, pinkish or brownish flowers with red lines and a labellum with a purplish "beard", but is leafless.

== Description ==
Calochilus pruinosus is a terrestrial, perennial, deciduous, herb with an underground tuber but is leafless. Up to fifteen dull greenish, pinkish or brownish flowers with red lines are borne on a flowering stem 150–500 mm (6–20 in) tall. The dorsal sepal is oblong to egg-shaped, 4–7 mm (0.2–0.3 in) long and 4–5.5 mm (0.16–0.22 in) wide. The lateral sepals are 8–10 mm (0.3–0.4 in) long and 3.5–4.5 mm (0.14–0.18 in) wide. The petals are broad egg-shaped and a similar size to the dorsal sepal. The labellum is curved, 10–14 mm (0.4–0.6 in) long and 5.5–6.5 mm (0.22–0.26 in) wide and has up to six dark purple plates with a metallic lustre near its base. The middle part of the labellum has scattered bristly hairs up to 4 mm (0.2 in) long and the tip has a glandular "tail" about 2.5 mm (0.1 in) long. The column has two purple "eyes" joined by a faint ridge. The flowers have a cupped appearance, only last two or three days and are thought to be self-pollinating. Flowering occurs from August to October.

== Taxonomy and naming ==
Calochilus pruinosus was first formally described in 2006 by David Jones and the description was published in Australian Orchid Research from a specimen collected near Hopetoun. The specific epithet (pruinosus) is a Latin word meaning "frosty" or "rimy".

== Distribution and habitat ==
The mallee beard orchid grows in woodland in coastal areas between Hopetoun and Eyre in the Esperance Plains and Hampton biogeographic regions.

== Conservation ==
As of 2011, C. pruinosus is only known from three sites near Hopetoun, although there are historical records from south of the Stirling Range and near Eyre. The species is classified as "critically endangered" under the Western Australian Wildlife Conservation Act 1950. The main threats to the species are habitat degradation, habitat loss and inappropriate fire regimes.
