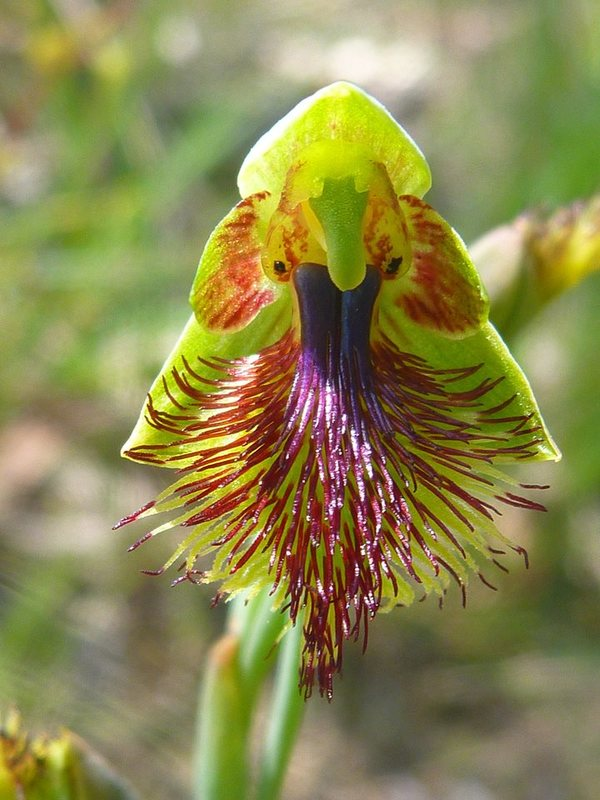
- Calochilus campestris

Scientific classification
- Kingdom: Plantae
- Clade: Embryophytes
- Clade: Tracheophytes
- Clade: Spermatophytes
- Clade: Angiosperms
- Clade: Monocots
- Order: Asparagales
- Family: Orchidaceae
- Subfamily: Orchidoideae
- Tribe: Diurideae
- Genus: Calochilus
- Species: C. campestris

Binomial name
- Calochilus campestris R.Br.

Synonyms
- Calochilus cupreus R.S.Rogers; Calochilus saprophyticus R.S.Rogers

= Calochilus campestris =

Copper beard orchid

Species of orchid

Calochilus campestris, commonly known as the copper beard orchid, is a species of orchid endemic to south-eastern Australia. It has a single fleshy, channelled leaf and up to fifteen pale green and red flowers with a purple "beard".

== Description ==
Calochilus campestris is a terrestrial, perennial, deciduous, herb with an underground tuber and a single fleshy, channelled leaf 150–350 mm (6–10 in) long, 10–15 mm (0.4–0.6 in) wide and triangular in cross section. Between three and fifteen pale green flowers with reddish lines, 18–22 mm (0.7–0.9 in) long and 12–16 mm (0.5–0.6 in) wide are borne on a flowering stem 300–600 mm (10–20 in) tall. The dorsal sepal is erect, egg-shaped, 9–12 mm (0.4–0.5 in) long and 6–7 mm (0.24–0.28 in) wide. The lateral sepals are a similar length but narrower. The petals are lance-shaped to egg-shaped, 6–8 mm (0.2–0.3 in) long, 3–4 mm (0.1–0.2 in) wide and spread widely apart from each other. The labellum is egg-shaped and curved in side view, 14–16 mm (0.55–0.63 in) long and 5–6 mm (0.20–0.24 in) wide. The base of the labellum is fleshy and has two smooth, metallic blue plates and the middle part has bristly purple hairs. The tip has a short glandular "tail" 4–5 mm (0.16–0.20 in) long. The column has two sham "eyes" but without a ridge joining them. Flowering occurs from October to November but each flower only lasts between two and four days.

== Taxonomy and naming ==
Calochilus campestris was first formally described in 1810 by Robert Brown and the description was published in Prodromus Florae Novae Hollandiae et Insulae Van Diemen. The specific epithet (campestris) is a Latin word meaning "of or pertaining to fields".

== Distribution and habitat ==
The copper beard orchid grows in a wide range of habitats from heath to montane forest. It is found south from the Blackdown Tableland in Queensland, in coastal New South Wales and as far inland as Temora and is widespread in Victoria. It is only known in Tasmania from a single collection from Clarke Island in 1979 and in South Australia from a single record in the Mount Billy Conservation Park on the Fleurieu Peninsula in 1983.

== Conservation ==
Calochilus campestris is class as "rare" in South Australia and as "endangered" in Tasmania under the Threatened Species Protection Act 1995. The main threats to the species on Clarke Island are land clearing, inappropriate fire regimes and inappropriate grazing regimes.
