= Calochilus ammobius =

Sand beard orchid

Scientific classification
- Kingdom: Plantae
- Clade: Tracheophytes
- Clade: Angiosperms
- Clade: Monocots
- Order: Asparagales
- Family: Orchidaceae
- Subfamily: Orchidoideae
- Tribe: Diurideae
- Genus: Calochilus
- Species: C. ammobius

Binomial name
- Calochilus ammobius D.L.Jones & B.Gray

Species of orchid

Calochilus ammobius, commonly known as the sand beard orchid, is a species of orchid endemic to Queensland. It has a single leaf which is not present during flowering and up to three dull green flowers with reddish brown streaks and a labellum with a purple "beard".

== Description ==
Calochilus ammobius is a terrestrial, perennial, deciduous, herb with an underground tuber and a single leaf 70–140 mm (3–6 in) long and 3–5 mm (0.1–0.2 in) wide but which is not present during flowering. Up to three short-lived dull green flowers with reddish brown streaks, 11–12 mm (0.4–0.5 in) long and 8–9 mm (0.3–0.4 in) wide are borne on a thin, wiry flowering stem 70–140 mm (3–6 in) tall. The dorsal sepal is 6–7 mm (0.2–0.3 in) long and about 4 mm (0.2 in) wide. The lateral sepals are a similar length but narrower. The petals are about 5 mm (0.20 in) long and 1.5 mm (0.06 in) wide. The labellum is flat, pale green and red, about 9 mm (0.4 in) long and 4 mm (0.2 in) wide. There are purplish hairs covering about three quarters of the labellum. The column has two purple sham "eyes". Flowering occurs from December to February but each flower only lasts a few hours.

== Taxonomy and naming ==
Calochilus ammobius was first formally described in 2002 by David Jones and Bruce Gray and the description was published in The Orchadian from specimens collected near Chewko. The specific epithet (ammobius) is derived from the Ancient Greek words ammos meaning "sand" and bios meaning "life".

== Distribution and habitat ==
The sand beard orchid grows in low forest with Melaleuca viridiflora, shrubs and grass tussocks in a small area near the type location.
