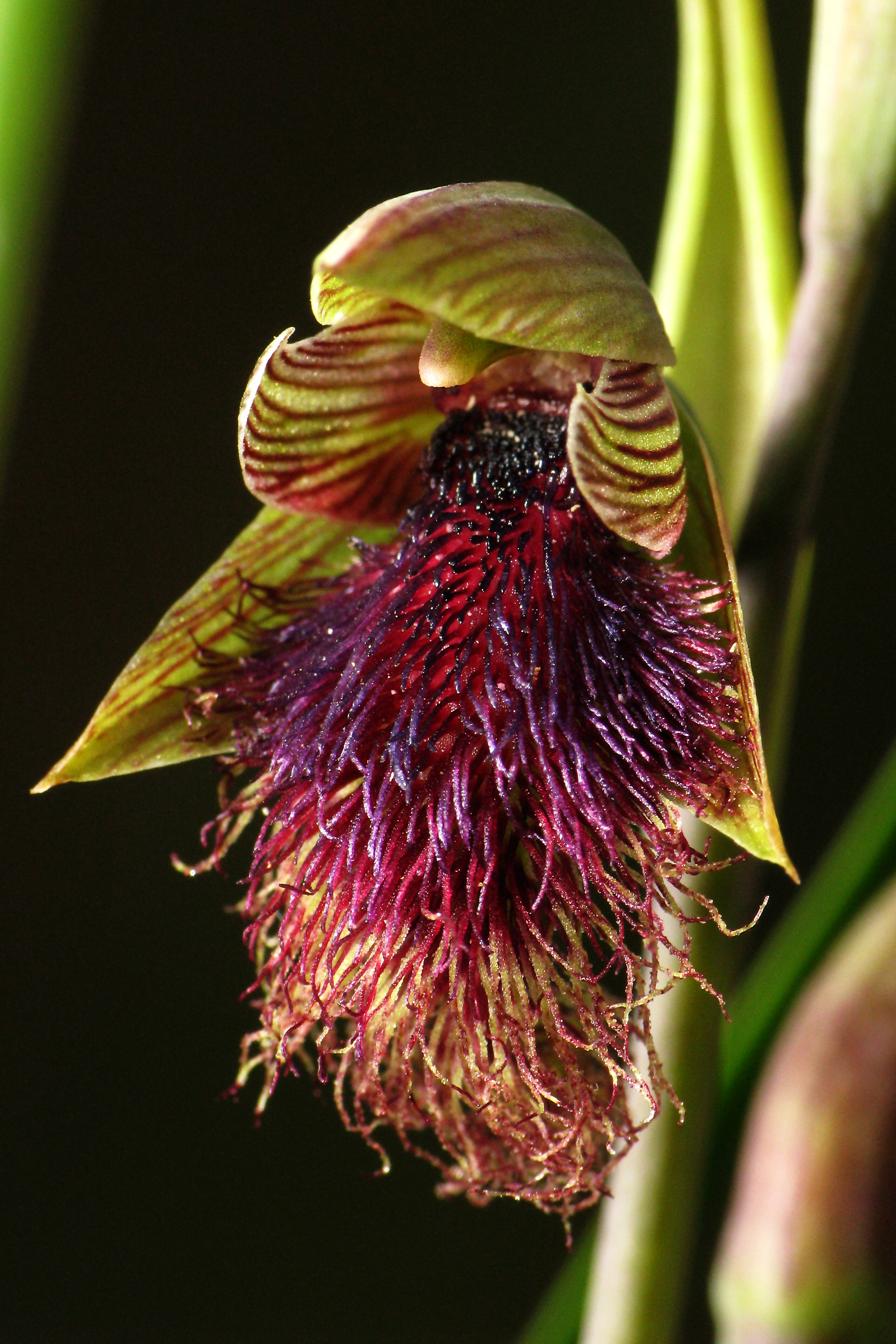
- Calochilus platychilus growing on Black Mountain in the A.C.T.

Scientific classification
- Kingdom: Plantae
- Clade: Tracheophytes
- Clade: Angiosperms
- Clade: Monocots
- Order: Asparagales
- Family: Orchidaceae
- Subfamily: Orchidoideae
- Tribe: Diurideae
- Genus: Calochilus
- Species: C. platychilus

Binomial name
- Calochilus platychilus D.L.Jones

= Calochilus platychilus =

Species of orchid

Calochilus platychilus is a plant in the orchid family Orchidaceae and is endemic to New South Wales. It was first formally described in 2008 by David Jones and the description was published in The Orchadian from a specimen collected on Black Mountain in the A.C.T. The specific epithet (platychilus) is derived from the Ancient Greek words πλατύς (platús) meaning “flat” and cheilos meaning "lip".
