= Calochilus holtzei =

Ghostly beard orchid

Scientific classification
- Kingdom: Plantae
- Clade: Tracheophytes
- Clade: Angiosperms
- Clade: Monocots
- Order: Asparagales
- Family: Orchidaceae
- Subfamily: Orchidoideae
- Tribe: Diurideae
- Genus: Calochilus
- Species: C. holtzei

Binomial name
- Calochilus holtzei F.Muell.

Species of orchid

Calochilus holtzei, commonly known as the ghostly beard orchid, is a species of orchid endemic to northwestern Australia. It has a single leaf and up to twenty pale green to yellowish flowers with red markings and a labellum with a greenish "beard".

== Description ==
Calochilus holtzei is a terrestrial, perennial, deciduous, herb with an underground tuber and a single leaf which is fully developed at flowering time, 300–550 mm (10–20 in) long, 10–20 mm (0.4–0.8 in) wide and triangular in cross section. Between eight and twenty pale green to yellowish flowers with red markings, 20–23 mm (0.8–0.9 in) long and 10–15 mm (0.4–0.6 in) wide are borne on a flowering stem 500–900 mm (20–40 in) tall. The dorsal sepal is 7–9 mm (0.3–0.4 in) long and 5–7 mm (0.20–0.28 in) wide. The lateral sepals are a similar length but narrower. The petals are 5–7 mm (0.20–0.28 in) long and about 4 mm (0.2 in) wide. The labellum curves downwards and is 14–17 mm (0.6–0.7 in) long and 9–12 mm (0.4–0.5 in) wide. The base of the labellum has purple calli and two purple plates. The middle section has bristly, greenish white hairs up to 5 mm (0.2 in) long and there is a narrow tip about 3 mm (0.1 in) long. Flowering occurs from December to March but each flower only lasts two or three days.

== Taxonomy and naming ==
Calochilus holtzei was first formally described in 1892 by Ferdinand von Mueller and the description was published in The Victorian Naturalist from specimens collected near Port Darwin by Maurice William Holtze. The specific epithet (holtzei) honours the collector of the type specimen.

== Distribution and habitat ==
The ghostly beard orchid grows with grasses in forest and woodland in the northern Kimberley region of Western Australia and on Melville Island in the Northern Territory.
