= Maurice William Holtze =

German botanist (1840–1923)

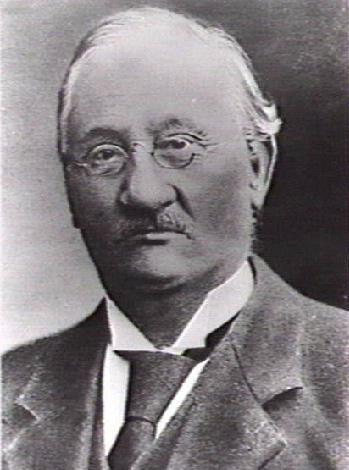
Maurice William Holtze

Maurice William Holtze ISO (8 July 1840 – 12 October 1923) born in the Kingdom of Hanover, was a botanist who established Darwin's Botanical Gardens in Fannie Bay, Darwin in 1878. When he left to take charge of Adelaide's Botanic Garden in 1891, his son Nicholas was appointed curator of the Darwin Botanical Gardens in his place.

Holtze studied at Hildesheim and Osnabrück before serving an apprenticeship in Hanover, where he subsequently worked for four years in the Royal Gardens. He spent two years in the Imperial Gardens of St. Petersburg before emigrating in 1872 to Melbourne, then to Darwin, Northern Territory.

While in Darwin (then called Palmerston, later Port Darwin) he made trial plantings of a large number of tropical plants of potential economic importance: rubber, rice, peanuts, tobacco, sugar, coffee, indigo and maize. He supplied the sugarcane tubers for the Cox's (later Cox) Peninsula sugarcane venture in which B. C. DeLissa and W. H. and G. T. Bean had a large interest.

He was involved in a private agricultural enterprise in Darwin's Jungle Creek and Palm Creek region, known as "Holtze Jungle", later "Holmes Jungle".

Holtze sent a large number of botanic specimens from the Darwin area and nearby islands, many of which had not been previously described, to Ferdinand von Mueller.

In Adelaide, succeeding the great Dr Schomburgk as curator, he did much to make the Botanic Gardens an attractive place for the general public to visit, a novel policy at the time. He established lakes populated with water-lilies and lotuses, which became famous.

He retired in 1917 and died in 1923 at American River on Kangaroo Island in South Australia at the home of his daughter. He is buried in the Penneshaw Cemetery on Kangaroo Island along with his wife, Evlampia (née Mizinzoff), who died 5 July 1937. A son, Alexis Leopold Holtze (1883 – 26 November 1938), was horticultural correspondent for the Mount Barker based The Courier, and editor of Garden and Field, later manager of radio station 5AD. He was killed in a single-vehicle car crash. Another son, Vladimir or Wladimir "Wallaby" Holtze (c. 1869 – c. 1963), was a linesman with the Overland Telegraph Department (later Postmaster-General's Department) from 1881, and stationed at Powell Creek, Daly Waters and for a time as postmaster at Tennant Creek. He died in Darwin.

== Recognition ==
- Clerodendron holtzei (now Clerodendrum holtzei), Sida holtzei, Habenaria holtzei and Polyalthia holtzeana were named for him.
- Probably also Northern Territory natives Uvaria holtzei, Aristolochia holtzei, Polycarpaea holtzei (incorrectly Polycarpaea holtzii), Trichosanthes holtzei, Goodenia holtzeana, Utricularia holtzei, Calochilus holtzei, Habenaria holtzei (since renamed Habenaria rumphii), Sterculia holtzei, Eulophia holtzei, Piper holtzei, Hibbertia holtzei and Calogyne holtzeana, of which all but two were described by Ferdinand von Mueller.
- He was awarded the Imperial Service Order in 1913.
- The outer Darwin locality, Holtze, was named for him.
