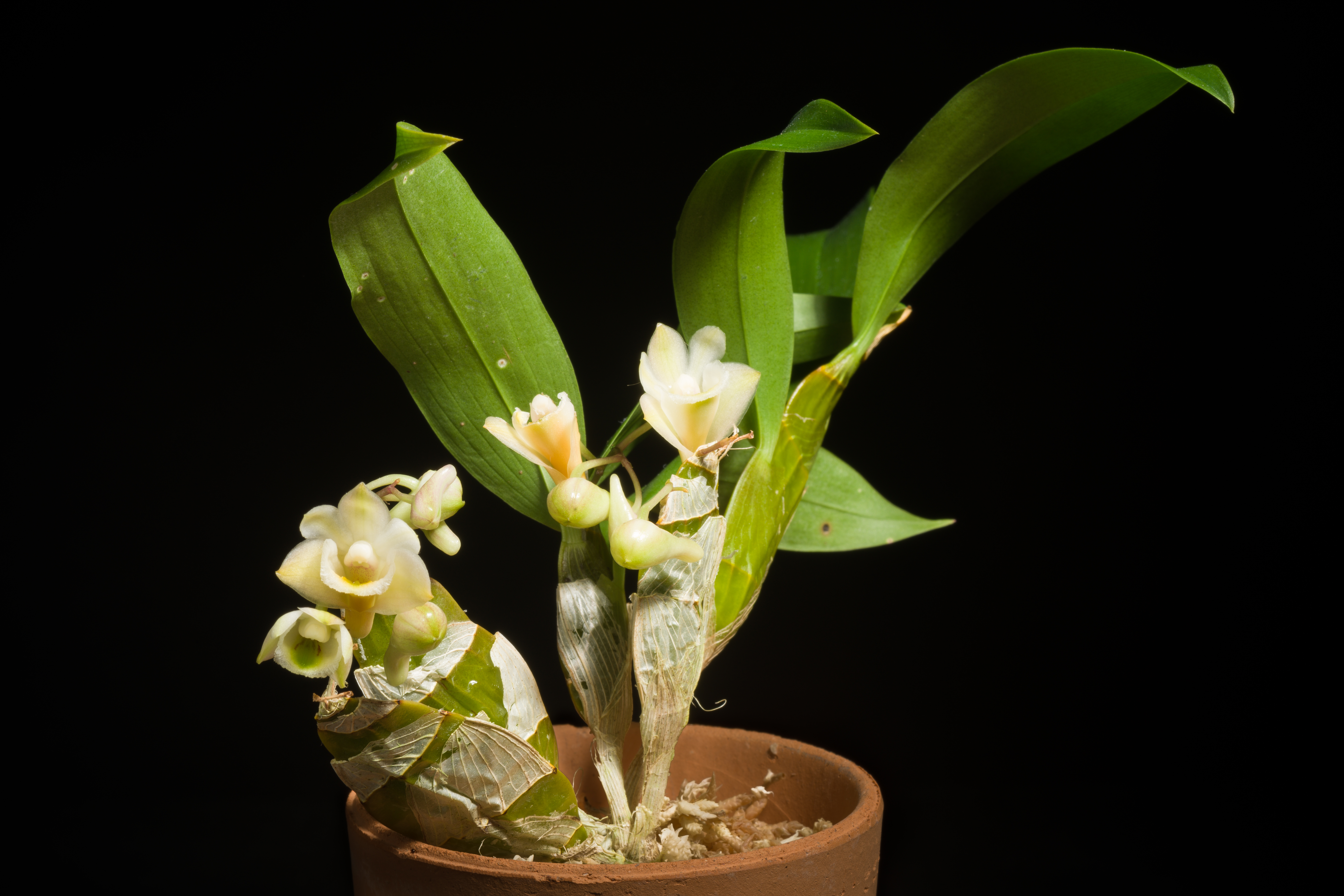
- Dendrobium compressum

Scientific classification
- Kingdom: Plantae
- Clade: Tracheophytes
- Clade: Angiosperms
- Clade: Monocots
- Order: Asparagales
- Family: Orchidaceae
- Subfamily: Epidendroideae
- Genus: Dendrobium
- Section: Dendrobium sect. Platycaulon

Type species
- Dendrobium lamellatum

Species
- See text

= Dendrobium sect. Platycaulon =

Section of flowering plants

Dendrobium section Platycaulon is a section of the genus Dendrobium.

== Description ==
Plants in this section have verrucose roots and broad flat stems.

== Distribution ==
Plants from this section are found in the lowlands of southeast Asia including Myanmar, Thailand, Philippines, Malaysia, Indonesia to New Guinea, Solomons, New Caledonia and Fiji.

== Species ==
Dendrobium section Platycaulon comprises the following species:

Image	Name	Distribution	Elevation (m)
	Dendrobium compressum Lindl. 1842	Myanmar, Thailand, Malaysia, Java, Sumatra, Borneo, and the Philippines	122–1,219 metres (400–3,999 ft)
	Dendrobium lamellatum (Bl.) Lindley 1830	Java	460–900 metres (1,510–2,950 ft)
	Dendrobium milaniae Fessel & Luckel 1996	Philippines (Leyte)	600 metres (2,000 ft)
	Dendrobium platycaulon Rolfe 1892	Borneo and the Philippines	0–500 metres (0–1,640 ft)
	Dendrobium platygastrium Rchb. f. 1878	Philippines, New Guinea, New Caledonia, Bismarck Archipelago, Solomon Island and Vanuatu	0–1,200 metres (0–3,937 ft)
	Dendrobium pseudolamellatum J.J.Wood & A.L.Lamb 2010	Borneo (Sabah)	700 metres (2,300 ft)
	Dendrobium speckmaieri Fessel & Lückel 2002	Sulawesi	1,524 metres (5,000 ft)
	Dendrobium semendoense Romiyadi, Sumardi & Cootes 2021	Sumatera	1,400 metres (4,600 ft)
	Dendrobium treubii J.J.Sm. 1905	Moluccas on Ambon Island	
	Dendrobium ypsilon Seidenf. 1985	Thailand	
