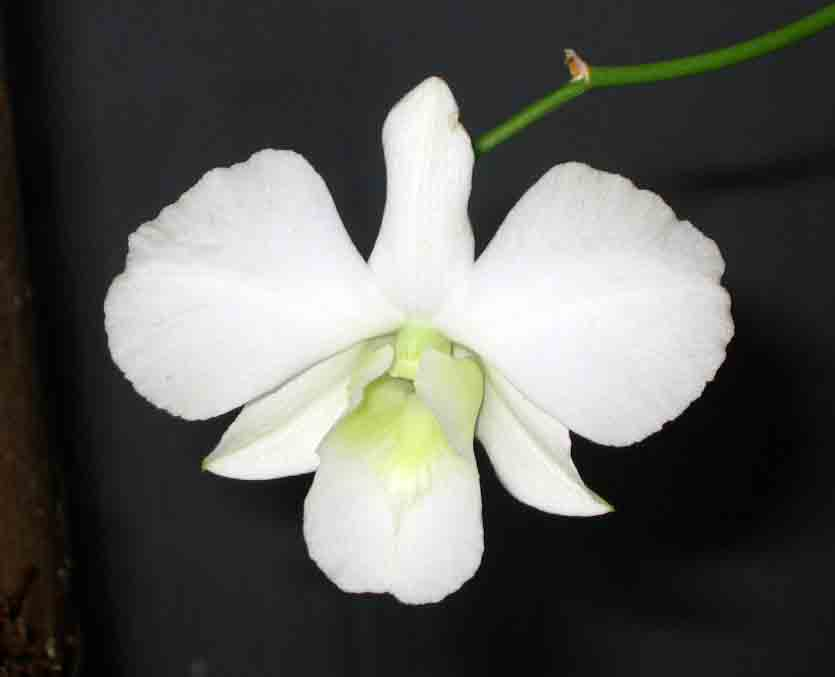
- Dendrobium bigibbum var. superbum f. alba

Scientific classification
- Kingdom: Plantae
- Clade: Tracheophytes
- Clade: Angiosperms
- Clade: Monocots
- Order: Asparagales
- Family: Orchidaceae
- Subfamily: Epidendroideae
- Genus: Dendrobium
- Section: Dendrobium sect. Phalaenanthe; Schlechter 1912

Type species
- Dendrobium bigibbum

Species
- See text

Synonyms
- Vappodes M A Clem & D L Jones 2002

= Dendrobium sect. Phalaenanthe =

Subgenus of flowering plants

Dendrobium section Phalaenanthe is a section of the genus Dendrobium.

== Description ==
Plants in this section have compact stems with leaves at the apex and long arching inflorescence.

== Distribution ==
Plants from this section are found in Australia and New Guinea.

== Species ==
Dendrobium section Phalaenanthe comprises the following species:

Image	Name	Distribution	Elevation (m)
	Dendrobium affine [Decais.] Steudel 1840	New Guinea (Timor, Seram and Tanimba)	0–300 metres (0–984 ft)
	Dendrobium bigibbum Lindl. (1852)	tropical North Queensland, Australia and New Guinea	0–400 metres (0–1,312 ft)
	Dendrobium williamsianum Rchb. f. 1878	Papua and New Guinea	60–300 metres (200–980 ft)

== Natural hybrids ==
Image	Name	Parentage	Distribution
	Dendrobium × superbiens Rchb.f. 1876	Dendrobium bigibbum × Dendrobium discolor	Queensland, Australia
