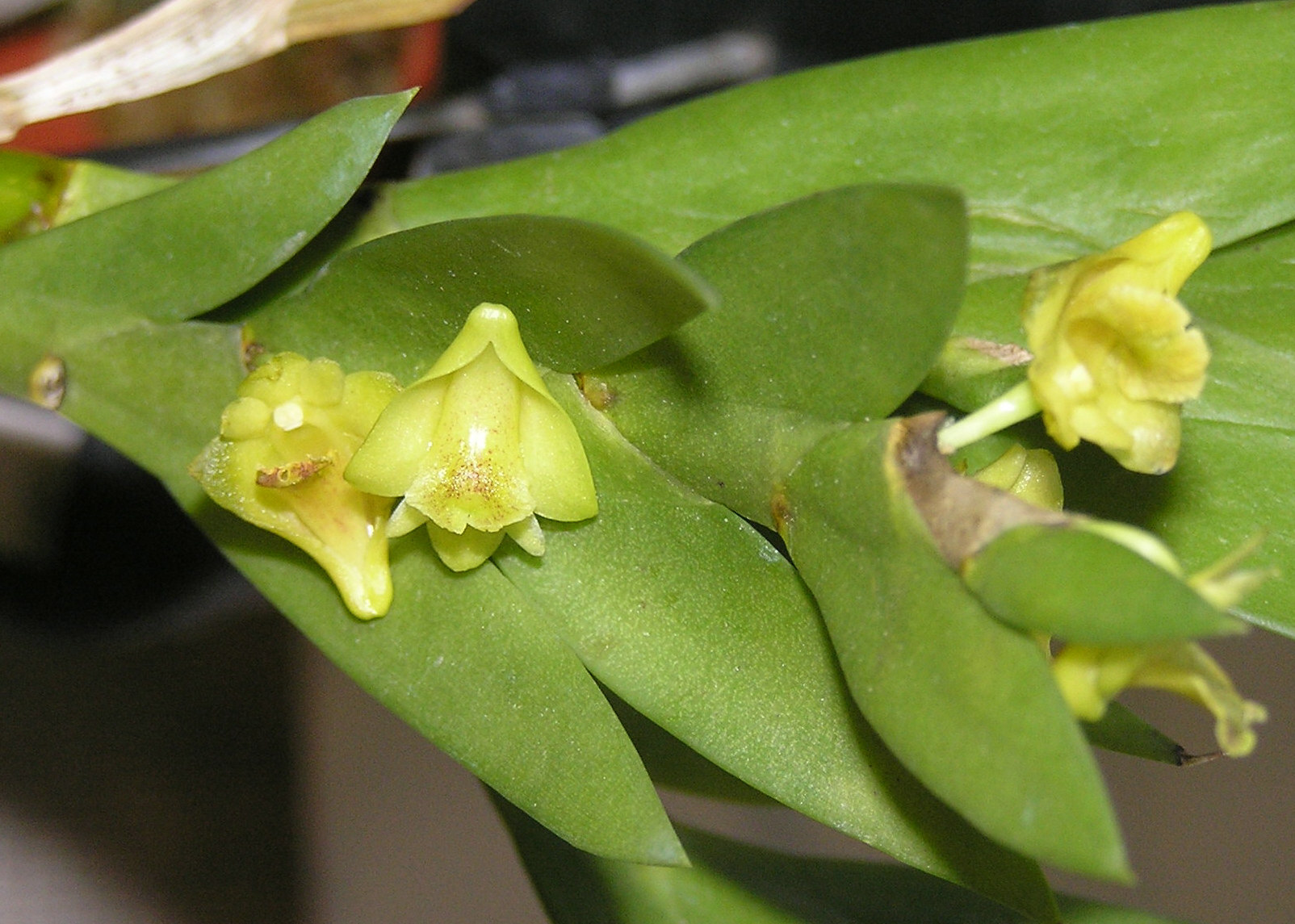
- Dendrobium anceps

Scientific classification
- Kingdom: Plantae
- Clade: Tracheophytes
- Clade: Angiosperms
- Clade: Monocots
- Order: Asparagales
- Family: Orchidaceae
- Subfamily: Epidendroideae
- Genus: Dendrobium
- Section: Dendrobium sect. Aporum; Lindley 1850

Type species
- Dendrobium lobatum

Species
- See text

Synonyms
- List: Aporosis [Schltr] M A Clem & D L Jones 2002; Aporum [Bl] Blume 1825; Ditulima Raf. 1836; Macrostomium Blume 1825; Orthoglottis Breda 1830; Shismoceras Presl. 1827; Dendrobium sect. Aporopsis [Schltr] Brieger 1981; Dendrobium sect. Hemiphylla Kraenzl. 1910; Dendrobium sect. Holophylla Kraenzl. 1910; Dendrobium sect. Macrostomium Bl. 1825; Dendrobium sect. Rhopalanthe Schltr.1914[1912]; Dendrobium subsect. Aporosis Schlechter 1912; Dendrobium sect. Strongyle Lindl. 1851; Dendrobium sect. Strongyle [Lindl.] Breiger 1981; Dendrobium sect. Aporum Kranzl. 1910; Dendrobium sect. Strongyle [Lindl] Kraenzl 1910; Dendrobium subgenus Xerobium Schlechter 1912; Dendrobium subsect. Strongyle [Lindley] H P Wood 2006

= Dendrobium sect. Aporum =

Subgenus of flowering plants

Dendrobium section Aporum is a section of the genus Dendrobium.

== Description ==
Plants in this section have compact short stems with slender and many leaves, leaves sheathing at the base, short single flower inflorescence. Lip not mobile.

== Distribution ==
Plants from this section are found in India, continental Southeast Asia, Malaysia, Singapore, Brunei, the Philippines, Indonesia, Papua New Guinea.

== Species ==
Dendrobium section Aporum comprises the following species:

Image	Name	Distribution	Elevation (m)
	Dendrobium acerosum Lindl. 1841	Borneo, Suluwesi, Sumatra, Malaysia, Thailand and Myanmar	50–1,600 metres (160–5,250 ft)
	Dendrobium acinaciforme Roxb. 1878	Assam, eastern Himalayas, Hainan China, south central China, Malaysia, Laos, Cambodia, Vietnam and the Moluccas	500–2,200 metres (1,600–7,200 ft)
	Dendrobium albayense Ames 1912	Philippines and Vietnam	0–900 metres (0–2,953 ft)
	Dendrobium aloifolium (Blume) Rchb.f. 1861	Myanmar, Thailand, Malaysia, Cambodia, Laos, Vietnam, Java, Sumatra, Borneo, Lesser Sunda Islands, New Guinea and the Philippines	0–600 metres (0–1,969 ft)
	Dendrobium anceps Sw. 1800	Assam, Bangladesh, Nepal, Bhutan, Sikkim, Andaman Islands, Myanmar, Thailand, Laos, Cambodia, Nicobar Islands and Vietnam	200–1,400 metres (660–4,590 ft)
	Dendrobium auyongii T.Yukawa 1998	Sarawak Borneo	300 metres (980 ft)
	Dendrobium babiense J.J.Sm.1912	Borneo	900–1,500 metres (3,000–4,900 ft)
	Dendrobium barioense J.J.Wood 2008	Sarawak Borneo	1,000–1,600 metres (3,300–5,200 ft)
	Dendrobium basilanense Ames 1912	Basilan Philippines	0–400 metres (0–1,312 ft)
	Dendrobium bilobulatum Seidenf. 1985	Thailand and Vietnam	10–1,500 metres (33–4,921 ft)
	Dendrobium brevimentum Seidenf. 1985	Thailand	620 metres (2,030 ft)
	Dendrobium capitellatoides J.J.Sm. 1917	Bangka Sumatra	760 metres (2,490 ft)
	Dendrobium chrysotainium Schltr.1910	Sulawesi	800–900 metres (2,600–3,000 ft)
	Dendrobium compressistylum J.J.Sm. 1926	Sumatra	100 metres (330 ft)
	Dendrobium concavum J.J.Sm. 1905	Moluccas	900 metres (3,000 ft)
	Dendrobium crucilabre J.J.Sm. 1927	Kalimantan Borneo	900–1,250 metres (2,950–4,100 ft)
	Dendrobium cuneatum Schltr. 1906	Moluccas and Sulawesi	
	Dendrobium curviflorum Rolfe 1895	Myanmar, Thailand and Laos	1,220 metres (4,000 ft)
	Dendrobium cyrilianum P.O'Byrne, Gokusing & J.J.Wood 2015	Sabah Borneo	300–400 metres (980–1,310 ft)
	Dendrobium dalatense Gagnep. 1930	southern Vietnam	
	Dendrobium diaphanum Schltr. 1910	Sulawesi	500–600 metres (1,600–2,000 ft)
	Dendrobium distichum [Presley]Rchb.f 1877	Philippines	0–900 metres (0–2,953 ft)
	Dendrobium flexile Ridl.1896	Thailand, Malaysia, Borneo and Sumatra	100 metres (330 ft)
	Dendrobium grande Hook.f. 1890	The Andaman Islands, Myanmar, Thailand, Malaysia, Sumatra, Java and Borneo	0–1,000 metres (0–3,281 ft)
	Dendrobium hainanense Rolfe 1896	China (Hainan)	300–1,700 metres (980–5,580 ft)
	Dendrobium hymenopetalum Schltr. 1911	Sumatra	1,000–1,200 metres (3,300–3,900 ft)
	Dendrobium indivisum [Blume] Miq. 1859	Myanmar, Thailand, Vietnam, Malaysia, Sumatra, Java, Borneo, and the Moluccas Islands	400–1,600 metres (1,300–5,200 ft)
	Dendrobium jennae P.O'Byrne 1996	Sulawesi	
	Dendrobium judithiae P.O'Byrne 1999	Sulawesi	
	Dendrobium keithii Ridl 1896	Thailand	
	Dendrobium kentrophyllum Hook.f. 1890	Laos, Thailand, peninsular Malaysia, Borneo and Sumatra	600–1,520 metres (1,970–4,990 ft)
	Dendrobium kiauense Ames & C.Schweinf. 1920	Kalimantan and Sabah, Borneo	300–1,700 metres (980–5,580 ft)
	Dendrobium korthalsii J.J.Sm. 1917	Kalimantan Borneo	0–1,100 metres (0–3,609 ft)
	Dendrobium kuyperi J.J.Sm. 1914	Sumatra	
	Dendrobium leonis Rchb. f. 1864	Thailand, peninsular Malaysia, Laos, Cambodia, Vietnam, Sumatra and Borneo	0–1,100 metres (0–3,609 ft)
	Dendrobium lobatum (Blume) Miq. 1859	Borneo, Java, Malaysia and Sumatra	0–1,000 metres (0–3,281 ft)
	Dendrobium lobulatum Rolfe & J.J. Sm. 1905	Sumatra, West Java, the Moluccas and Borneo	0–1,200 metres (0–3,937 ft)
	Dendrobium lohanense J.J.Wood 2011	Borneo	300–1,300 metres (980–4,270 ft)
	Dendrobium longiramense J.J.Wood & P.O'Byrne 2010	Kalimantan Borneo	0–300 metres (0–984 ft)
	Dendrobium lunatum Lindl. 1858	Palawan Philippines	0–500 metres (0–1,640 ft)
	Dendrobium macfarlanei F. Muell. 1876	New Guinea	
	Dendrobium macraporum J.J.Sm. 1912	Sulawesi	300–900 metres (980–2,950 ft)
	Dendrobium mannii Ridl. 1896	Assam, Thailand, Malaysia, Laos, Cambodia and Vietnam	300–900 metres (980–2,950 ft)
	Dendrobium marivelense Ames 1908	Philippines	1,500 metres (4,900 ft)
	Dendrobium merrillii Ames 1908	Philippines on Luzon, Mindoro and Samar Islands	350 metres (1,150 ft)
	Dendrobium mindanaense Ames 1913 publ. 1914	Philippines	0–300 metres (0–984 ft)
	Dendrobium moluccense J.J.Sm. 1914	Moluccas	0 metres (0 ft)
	Dendrobium montis-hosei J.J.Wood 2008	Borneo	800–1,650 metres (2,620–5,410 ft)
	Dendrobium nathanielis Rchb.f. 1857	Assam India, Myanmar, Thailand, Cambodia, Laos and Vietnam	180–280 metres (590–920 ft)
	Dendrobium optimuspatruus P.O'Byrne & J.J.Verm. 2003	Malaysia	
	Dendrobium paitanense J.J.Wood 2010	Borneo	400–450 metres (1,310–1,480 ft)
	Dendrobium parciflorum Rchb.f. ex Lindl.1859	Assam, Thailand, Laos, China, Vietnam and the Philippines	800–1,700 metres (2,600–5,600 ft)
	Dendrobium patentilobum Ames & C.Schweinf. 1920	Sabah, Borneo	800–1,700 metres (2,600–5,600 ft)
	Dendrobium platyphyllum Schltr. 1906	Sumatra, Borneo	270 metres (890 ft)
	Dendrobium pleasancium P.O'Byrne & J.J.Verm. 2003	Borneo	100–300 metres (330–980 ft)
	Dendrobium prostratum Ridl.1896	Malaysia, Borneo and Sumatra	500–600 metres (1,600–2,000 ft)
	Dendrobium pseudoaloifolium J.J.Wood 1984	Sarawak Borneo	100–300 metres (330–980 ft)
	Dendrobium quadrilobatum Carr 1929	peninsular Malaysia and Borneo	100–700 metres (330–2,300 ft)
	Dendrobium ramificans J.J.Sm. 1904	Sulawesi and the Moluccas	280–900 metres (920–2,950 ft)
	Dendrobium reflexitepalum J.J.Sm. 1921	Java and Sumatra	200–1,000 metres (660–3,280 ft)
	Dendrobium reginanivis P.O'Byrne & J.J.Verm. 2003	Sulawesi	1,100–1,200 metres (3,600–3,900 ft)
	Dendrobium rhodostele Ridl.1893	Thailand, Malaysia, Sumatra and Borneo	600 metres (2,000 ft)
	Dendrobium rhombopetalum Kraenzl. 1910	southern Sumatra	700 metres (2,300 ft)
	Dendrobium rosellum Ridl. 1896	peninsular Malaysia, Sabah, Borneo and Sumatra	800–1,100 metres (2,600–3,600 ft)
	Dendrobium roseonervatum Schltr. 1904	Sumatra	
	Dendrobium roseostriatum Ridl. 1925	Bengkulu Sumatra	
	Dendrobium sabahense J.J.Wood 2008	Borneo	300–1,300 metres (980–4,270 ft)
	Dendrobium sagittatum J.J.Sm. 1905	Java and Sumatra	700–1,500 metres (2,300–4,900 ft)
	Dendrobium sambasanum J.J.Sm. 1909	Borneo	300 metres (980 ft)
	Dendrobium singaporense A.D.Hawkes & A.H.Heller 1957	Malaysia, peninsular Thailand, Borneo and Sumatra	200 metres (660 ft)
	Dendrobium smithianum Schltr. 1911	Borneo?, the Moluccas and Sulawesi	300–1,300 metres (980–4,270 ft)
	Dendrobium spatella Rchb.f. 1865	Assam, eastern Himalayas, Myanmar, Cambodia, Laos, Vietnam, China (Fujian, Guangxi, Hainan and Yunnan, Hong Kong) and Malaysia	500–900 metres (1,600–3,000 ft)
	Dendrobium sphenochilum F.Muell. & Kraenzl. 1894	Papua and New Guinea	50–500 metres (160–1,640 ft)
	Dendrobium subpandifolium J.J.Sm. 1927	island of Bangka in Sumatra	500 metres (1,600 ft)
	Dendrobium subulatoides Schltr. 1911	Sabah and Sarawak Borneo	0–1,100 metres (0–3,609 ft)
	Dendrobium subulatum (Blume) Lindl. 1830	Thailand, Malaysia, Borneo, Java and Sumatra	0–650 metres (0–2,133 ft)
	Dendrobium terminale Par. & Rchb.f. 1874	Assam India, Bhutan, Sikkim, Myanmar, Malaysia, peninsular Thailand, Vietnam and China (Yunnan)	500–1,600 metres (1,600–5,200 ft)
	Dendrobium tetralobum Schltr. 1906	Kalamantan Borneo	
	Dendrobium thysanophorum Schltr. 1911	Sulawesi	1,100 metres (3,600 ft)
	Dendrobium truongcuongii Aver. & V.C.Nguyen 2018	Vietnam	
	Dendrobium uncatum Lindl. 1859	southern Vietnam, western Java, Sumatra, and Sabah Borneo	200–1,400 metres (660–4,590 ft)
	Dendrobium vanhulstijnii J.J.Sm. 1917	Moluccas	
	Dendrobium wenzelii Ames 1915	Philippines	300 metres (980 ft)
	Dendrobium xanthoacron Schltr. 1906	Borneo	1,700 metres (5,600 ft)
	Dendrobium xiphophyllum Schltr. 1911	Kalimantan Borneo	550–800 metres (1,800–2,620 ft)
