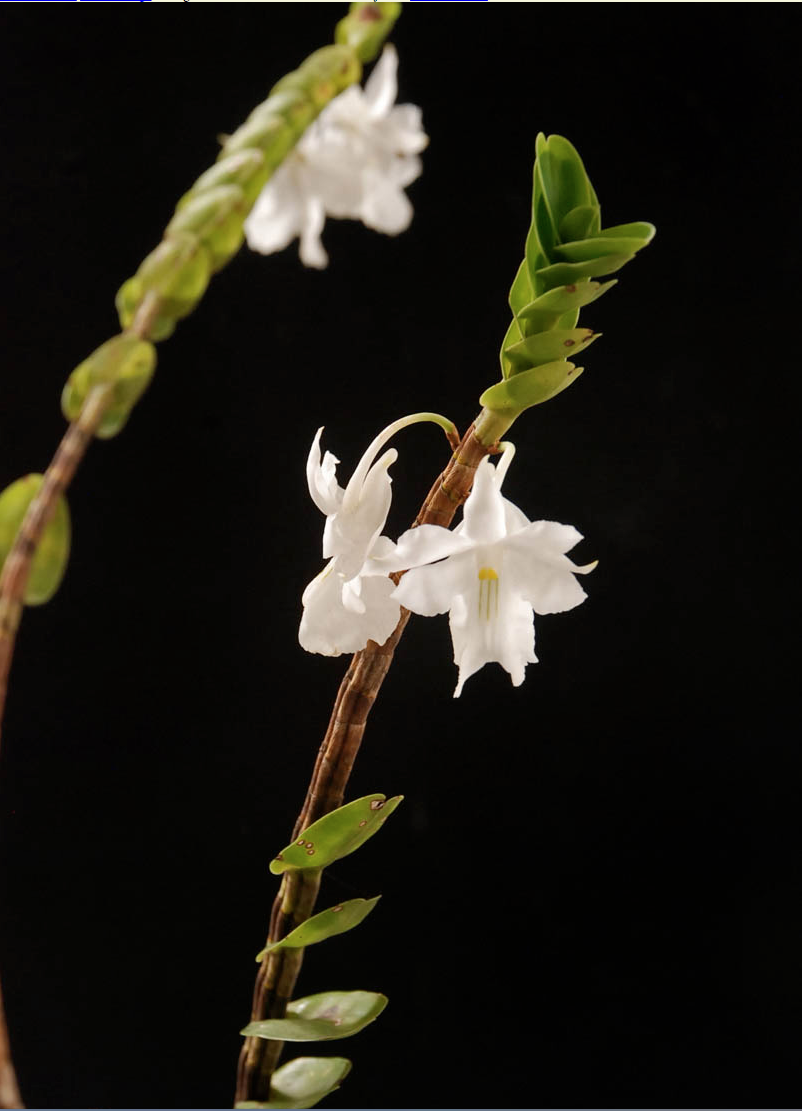
- Dendrobium uniflorum f. alba

Scientific classification
- Kingdom: Plantae
- Clade: Tracheophytes
- Clade: Angiosperms
- Clade: Monocots
- Order: Asparagales
- Family: Orchidaceae
- Subfamily: Epidendroideae
- Genus: Dendrobium
- Section: Dendrobium sect. Distichophyllae

Type species
- Dendrobium revolutum

Species
- See text

Synonyms
- Dendrobium sect. Distichophyllum Schltr. 1906; Distichorchis M A Clem. & D L Jones 2002; Dendrobium sect. Revoluta Kraenzl. 1910

= Dendrobium sect. Distichophyllae =

Subgenus of flowering plants

Dendrobium section Distichophyllae is a section of the genus Dendrobium.

== Description ==
Plants in this section have short creeping rhizomes, rigid straight leaves, and one or more solitary flowers.

== Distribution ==
Plants from this section are found from China, to Southeast Asia, Australia, and New Guinea.

== Species ==
Dendrobium section Distichophyllae comprises the following species:

Image	Name	Distribution	Elevation (m)
	Dendrobium austrocaledonicum Schlechter 1906	Solomon Islands, New Caledonia and Vanuatu	10–900 metres (33–2,953 ft)
	Dendrobium baoernianum P.O'Byrne, P.T.Ong & J.J.Wood 2013	Borneo	
	Dendrobium bihamulatum J.J.Sm. 1917	Sumatra	1,000 metres (3,300 ft)
	Dendrobium connatum (Blume) Lindl. 1830	Java, Borneo, Sulawesi and Sumatra	400–1,600 metres (1,300–5,200 ft)
	Dendrobium corrugatilobum J.J.Sm. 1921	western Java and Sulawesi	1,000–1,400 metres (3,300–4,600 ft)
	Dendrobium daimandaui J.J.Wood 2011	Borneo	200–700 metres (660–2,300 ft)
	Dendrobium deltatum Seidenf. 1985	eastern Thailand	610 metres (2,000 ft)
	Dendrobium ellipsophyllum T. Tang & F.T. Wang 1951	Myanmar, Thailand, Laos, Vietnam and Yunnan Province China	300–1,000 metres (980–3,280 ft)
	Dendrobium hepaticum J.J.Sm.1917	western Borneo	1,200 metres (3,900 ft)
	Dendrobium hosei Ridl. 1893	Malaysia, Borneo and New Guinea	400–1,000 metres (1,300–3,300 ft)
	Dendrobium kenepaiense J.J.Sm. 1918	Borneo	0–100 metres (0–328 ft)
	Dendrobium khanhoaense Aver. 1999	central coastal Vietnam	1,200–1,500 metres (3,900–4,900 ft)
	Dendrobium lambii J.J.Wood 1983	Sabah Borneo	1,600–1,900 metres (5,200–6,200 ft)
	Dendrobium lamrianum C.L.Chan 1994	northern Borneo	1,100–1,800 metres (3,600–5,900 ft)
	Dendrobium lohokii J.J.Wood & A.L.Lamb 2008	Sabah and Brunei Borneo	400–900 metres (1,300–3,000 ft)
	Dendrobium maraiparense J.J. Wood & C.L. Chan 1994	Sabah & Sarawak Borneo	1,200–2,300 metres (3,900–7,500 ft)
	Dendrobium meiernianum P.O'Byrne, P.T.Ong & J.J.Wood 2013	Borneo	
	Dendrobium mellicolor J.J.Sm. 1927	Sumatra	
	Dendrobium moquetteanum J.J.Sm. 1917	Borneo	400–1,400 metres (1,300–4,600 ft)
	Dendrobium nabawanense J.J.Wood & A.L.Lamb in J.J.Wood & P.J.Cribb 1994	Kalimantan and Sabah, Borneo	500–700 metres (1,600–2,300 ft)
	Dendrobium ochthochilum P.O'Byrne & J.J.Verm. 2003	Sumatra	1,500–1,700 metres (4,900–5,600 ft)
	Dendrobium oligophyllum Gagnep.1950	southern Vietnam and southeastern Thailand	200–650 metres (660–2,130 ft)
	Dendrobium olivaceum J.J.Sm. 1912	Borneo	900–2,000 metres (3,000–6,600 ft)
	Dendrobium osmophytopsis Kraenzl. 1910	Borneo	300 metres (980 ft)
	Dendrobium pachyanthum Schltr. 1911	Borneo	400–1,200 metres (1,300–3,900 ft)
	Dendrobium pandaneti Ridl. 1896	Thailand, peninsular Malaysia, Sumatra, Java and Borneo	400–600 metres (1,300–2,000 ft)
	Dendrobium piranha C.L.Chan & P.J.Cribb 1994	Borneo	1,400–2,400 metres (4,600–7,900 ft)
	Dendrobium refractum Teijsm. & Binn. 1862	Lampung Sumatra	
	Dendrobium revolutum Lindl. 1840	Myanmar, Thailand, Laos, Vietnam and Yunnan Province China	300–1,000 metres (980–3,280 ft)
	Dendrobium rupicola Ridl. 1915	peninsular Malaysia	
	Dendrobium sandsii J.J.Wood & C.L.Chan 1994	Sabah Borneo	350 metres (1,150 ft)
	Dendrobium siberutense J.J.Sm. 1922	Siberut Island, Sumatra	
	Dendrobium taprobanium Priyadarshana, Atthanagoda, Harshajith, Wijewardhane, Aberathna, Peabotuwage & Kumar 2020	Sri Lanka	185 metres (607 ft)
	Dendrobium trinervium Ridl. 1896	Thailand and peninsular Malaysia	100 metres (330 ft)
	Dendrobium uniflorum Griff. 1851	Thailand, Vietnam, peninsular Malaysia, Sumatra, Borneo, Sulawesi and the Philippines	300–1,600 metres (980–5,250 ft)
