= Ceraia =

Ceraia may refer to:

- Ceraia (plant), a genus of orchids now treated as a synonym of Dendrobium
- Ceraia (katydid), a genus of katydids in the Phaneropterinae
