= Dendrobium bilobum =

The Two Lobed Dendrobium

Scientific classification
- Kingdom: Plantae
- Clade: Tracheophytes
- Clade: Angiosperms
- Clade: Monocots
- Order: Asparagales
- Family: Orchidaceae
- Subfamily: Epidendroideae
- Genus: Dendrobium
- Species: D. bilobum

Binomial name
- Dendrobium bilobum Lindl., 1848

Synonyms
- Callista biloba (Lindl.) Kuntze 1891; Monanthos biloba (Lindl.) Brieger 1981

Species of orchid

Dendrobium bilobum, the two-lobed dendrobium, is a species of orchid of the genus Dendrobium native to Oceania.

It is found in New Guinea, Solomon Islands, Vanuatu, Fiji and New Caledonia. It grows to a maximum size of 0.5 centimetres (0.20 in).
