= Dendrobium begaudii =

Scientific classification
- Kingdom: Plantae
- Clade: Tracheophytes
- Clade: Angiosperms
- Clade: Monocots
- Order: Asparagales
- Family: Orchidaceae
- Subfamily: Epidendroideae
- Genus: Dendrobium
- Species: D. begaudii

Binomial name
- Dendrobium begaudii (Cavestro) Schuit. & Peter B.Adams

Synonyms
- Diplocaulobium begaudii Cavestro (2001)

Species of orchid

Dendrobium begaudii is a species of orchid native to New Caledonia. It was first described by William Cavestro in 2001 under the name Diplocaulobium begaudii but was subsequently referred to the genus Dendrobium by Schuiteman & Adams.
