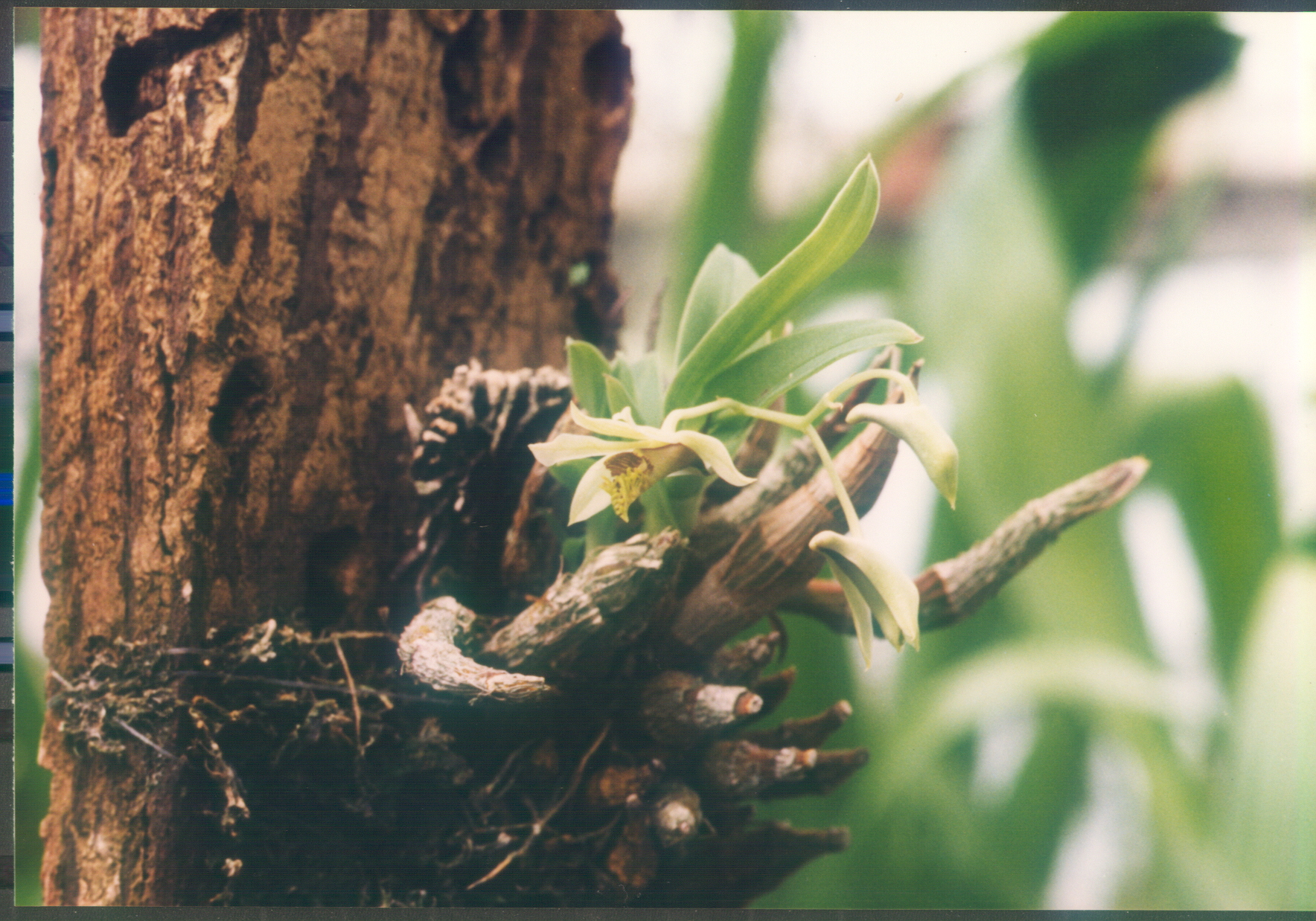

Scientific classification
- Kingdom: Plantae
- Clade: Tracheophytes
- Clade: Angiosperms
- Clade: Monocots
- Order: Asparagales
- Family: Orchidaceae
- Subfamily: Epidendroideae
- Genus: Dendrobium
- Species: D. delacourii

Binomial name
- Dendrobium delacourii Guillaumin

= Dendrobium delacourii =

Species of orchid

Dendrobium delacourii is a member of the family Orchidaceae. It is native to Thailand, Vietnam, Laos and Myanmar.

== Description ==
Dendrobium delacourii is a miniature sized epiphyte. It has elliptical clumping pseudobulbs that each carry 2-4 deciduous leaves. Flowers have a prominent fringed labellum.
