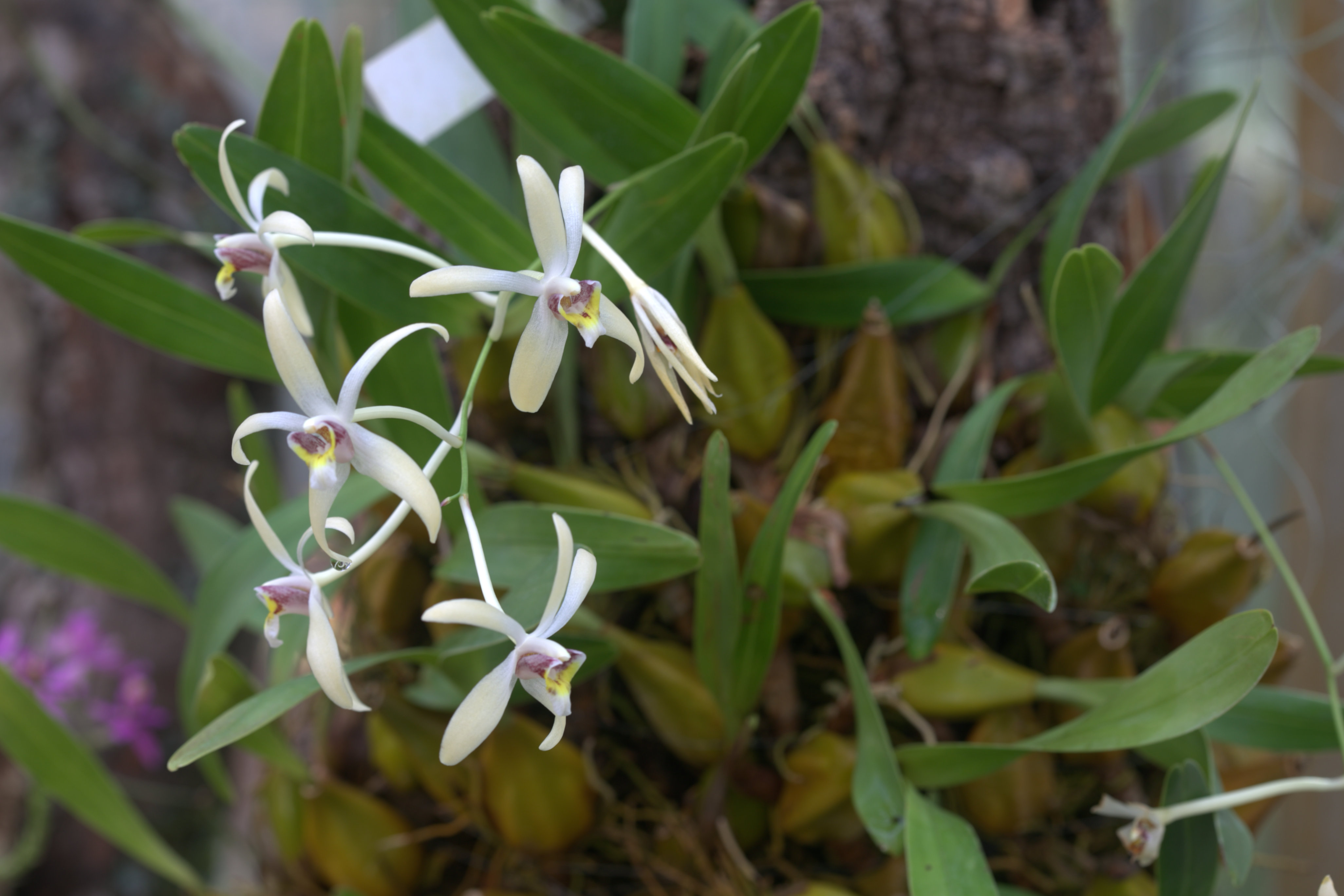

Scientific classification
- Kingdom: Plantae
- Clade: Tracheophytes
- Clade: Angiosperms
- Clade: Monocots
- Order: Asparagales
- Family: Orchidaceae
- Subfamily: Epidendroideae
- Genus: Dendrobium
- Species: D. geminatum

Binomial name
- Dendrobium geminatum (Blume) Lindl.

Synonyms
- List: Callista geminata (Blume) Kuntze; Desmotrichum geminatum Blume; Epigeneium geminatum (Blume) Summerh.; Katherinea geminata (Blume) A.D.Hawkes; Sarcopodium geminatum (Blume) Rolfe; Callista triflora (Blume) Kuntze; Dendrobium triflorum (Blume) Lindl.; Desmotrichum triflorum Blume; Epigeneium triflorum (Blume) Summerh.; Sarcopodium triflorum (Blume) Rolfe

= Dendrobium geminatum =

Species of orchid

Dendrobium geminatum is a species of orchid native to Southeast Asia.

== Distribution ==
The orchid is native to the islands of Borneo, Java and Sumatra and to Peninsular Malaysia.

The epiphytic plants are found growing in large clumps on branches of large trees, in the mountains of Java at elevations of 1,000–1,800 metres (3,300–5,900 ft).

== Description ==
Dendrobium geminatum blooms with three to six creamy white flowers, 5 cm (2.0 in) wide, from winter to spring.
