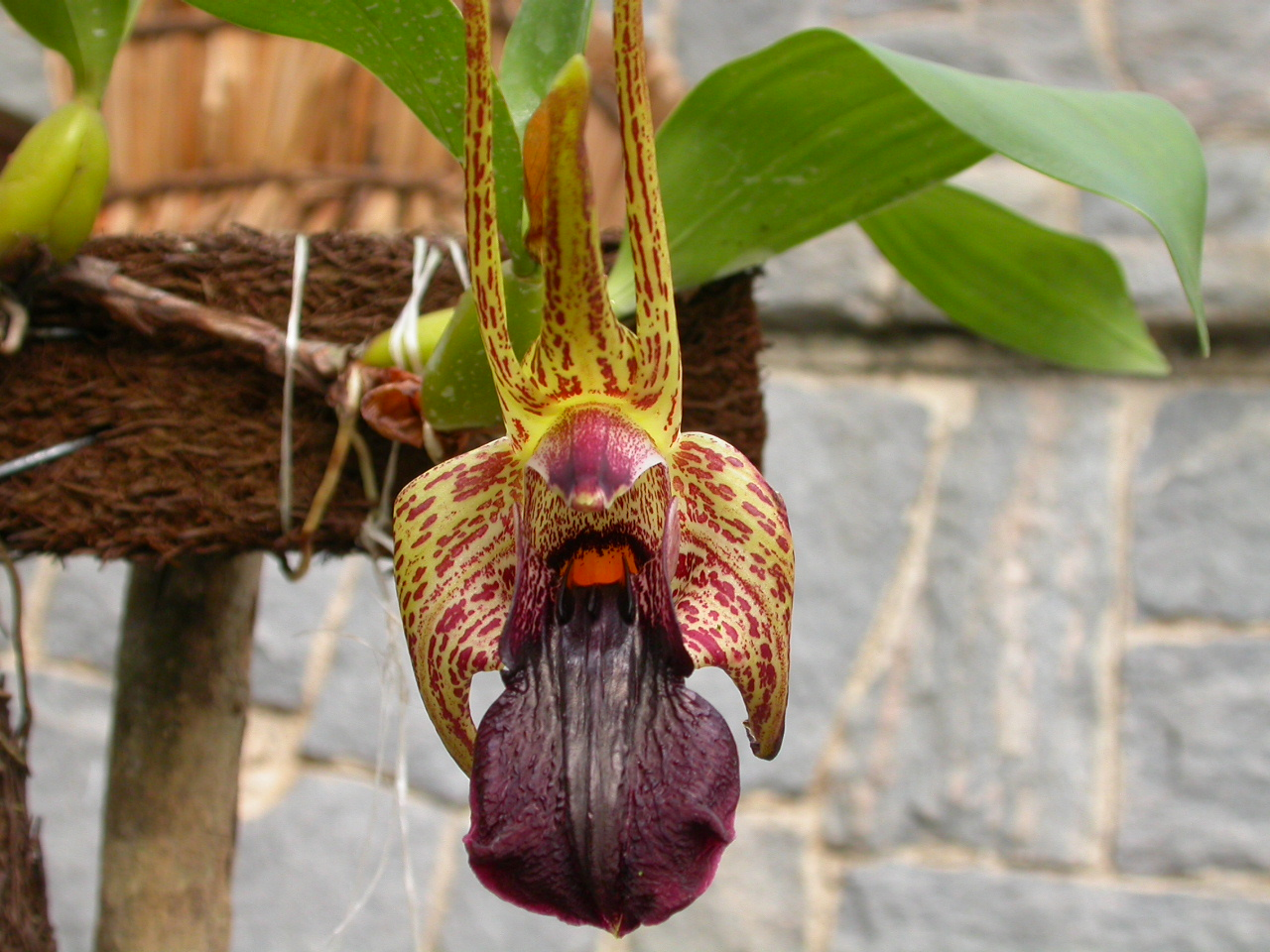

Scientific classification
- Kingdom: Plantae
- Clade: Tracheophytes
- Clade: Angiosperms
- Clade: Monocots
- Order: Asparagales
- Family: Orchidaceae
- Subfamily: Epidendroideae
- Genus: Dendrobium
- Species: D. amplum

Binomial name
- Dendrobium amplum Lindl.

Synonyms
- Epigeneium amplum (Lindl.) Summerh.; Sarcopodium amplum(Lindl.) Lindl. & Paxton; Bulbophyllum amplum (Lindl.) Rchb.f.; Dendrobium coelogyne Rchb.f.; Callista ampla (Lindl.) Kuntze; Callista coelogyne (Rchb.f.) Kuntze; Sarcopodium coelogyne (Rchb.f.) Rolfe; Sarcopodium annamense Guillaumin; Katherinea ampla (Lindl.) A.D. Hawkes; Katherinea coelogyne (Rchb.f.) A.D. Hawkes; Epigeneium coelogyne (Rchb.f.) Summerh.; Epigeneium annamense (Guillaumin) Seidenf.

= Dendrobium amplum =

Species of orchid

Dendrobium amplum is a species of orchid native to Asia.

It is found in China, India in Assam and Sikkim, the eastern Himalayas, Nepal, Bhutan, Myanmar, Thailand, and Vietnam.

The orchid is a small sized, warm to cold growing epiphyte or lithophyte on mossy limestone rocks, in semi-deciduous and evergreen forests at elevations of 500–2,100 metres (1,600–6,900 ft).
