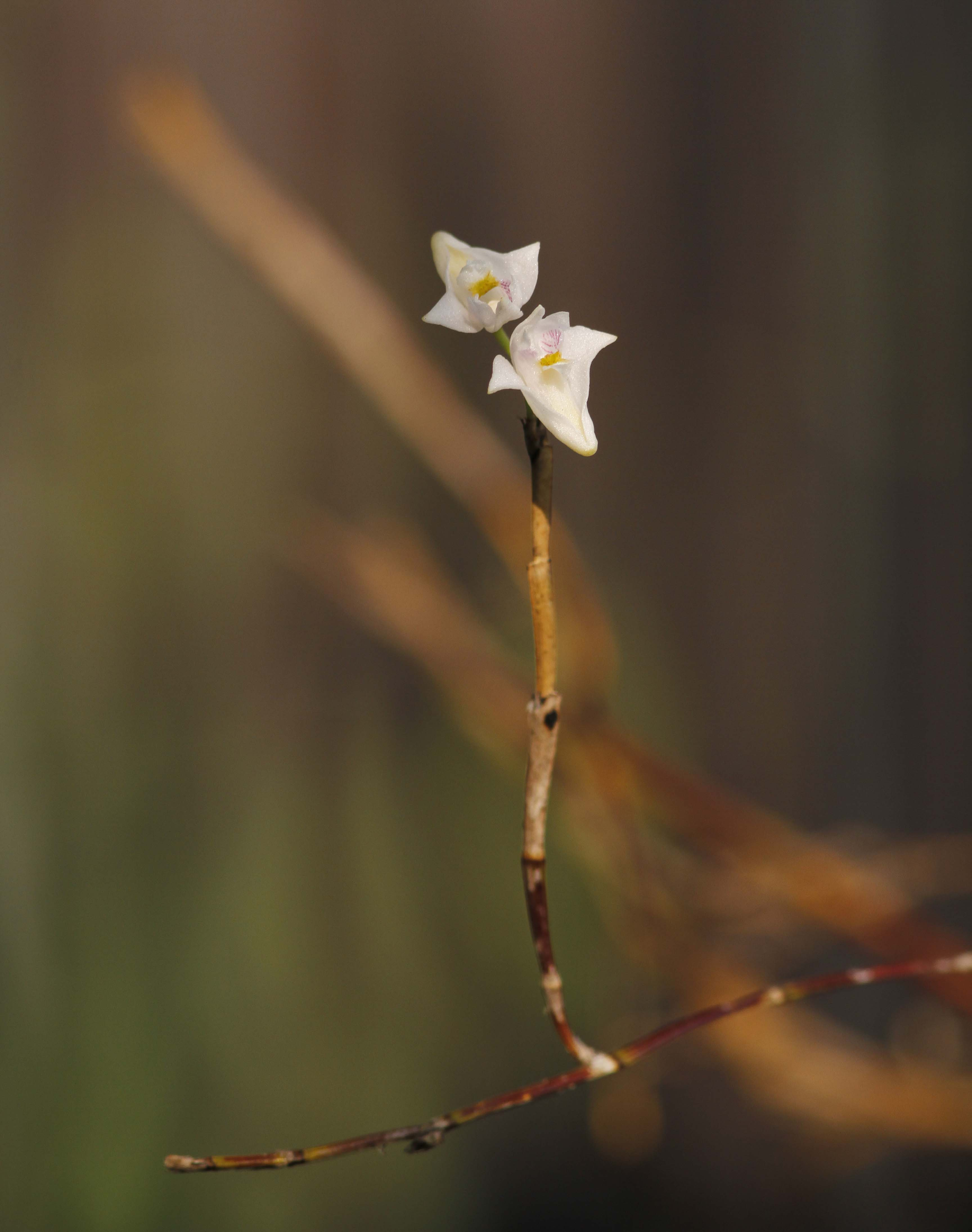
- In Bangladesh

Scientific classification
- Kingdom: Plantae
- Clade: Tracheophytes
- Clade: Angiosperms
- Clade: Monocots
- Order: Asparagales
- Family: Orchidaceae
- Subfamily: Epidendroideae
- Genus: Dendrobium
- Species: D. angulatum

Binomial name
- Dendrobium angulatum Lindl., 1830

Synonyms
- Callista angulata (Lindl.) Kuntze; Ceraia inconcinna (Ridl.) M.A.Clem.; Dendrobium inconcinnum Ridl.; Dendrobium podagraria Hook.f.

= Dendrobium angulatum =

Species of orchid

Dendrobium angulatum is an epiphytic orchid native to Southeast Asia.

== Description ==
The stem is 40–100 cm long and slender. The flowers are small, 1.0–1.2 cm long with white with pink lines on the lip. It flowers and fruits between April and July.

== Distribution and habitat ==
The species grows on tree trunks in subtropical rain forests. It is found in Bangladesh, India (Assam), Myanmar, southwestern Thailand, and Vietnam.
