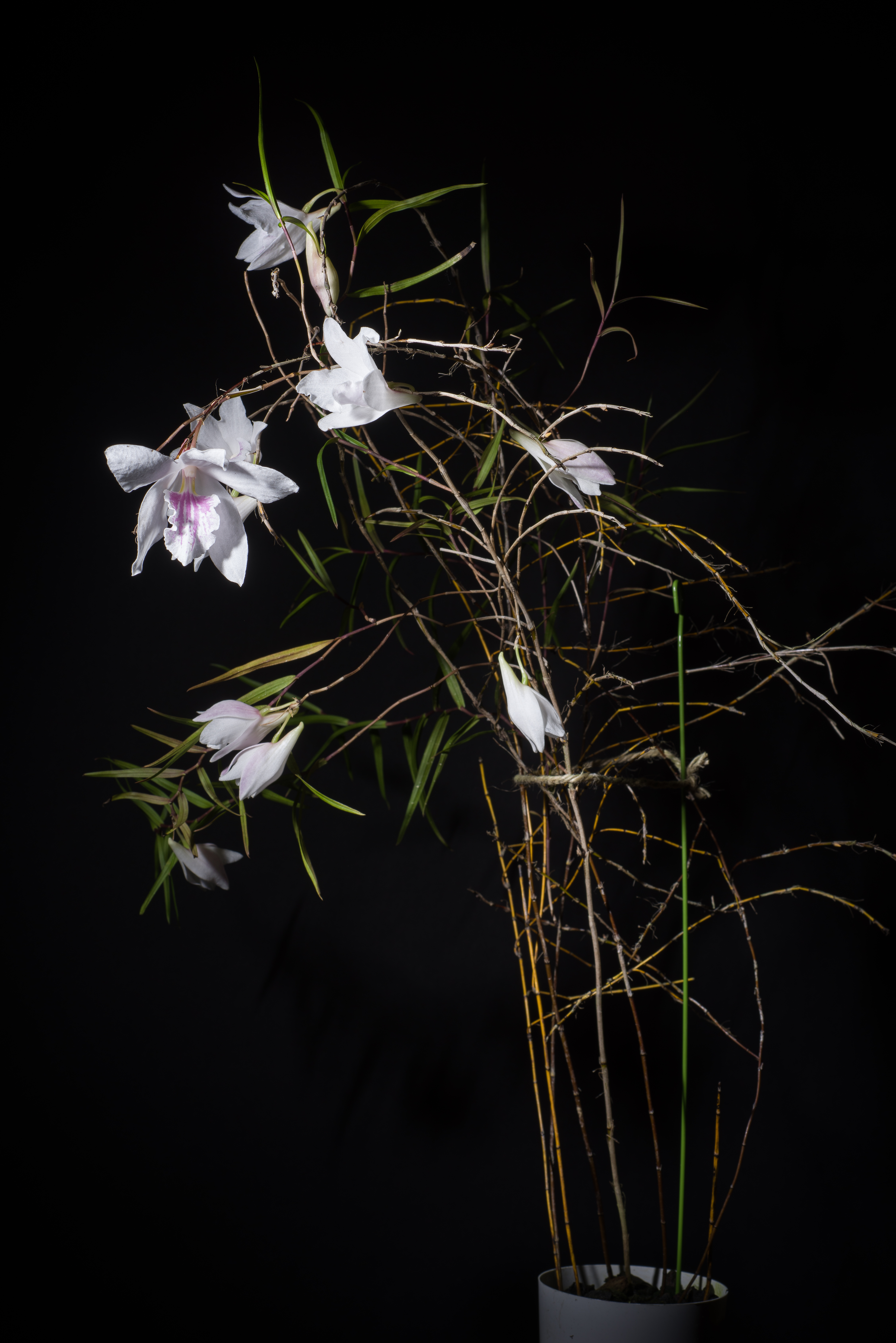
- Dendrobium papilio

Scientific classification
- Kingdom: Plantae
- Clade: Tracheophytes
- Clade: Angiosperms
- Clade: Monocots
- Order: Asparagales
- Family: Orchidaceae
- Subfamily: Epidendroideae
- Genus: Dendrobium
- Section: Dendrobium sect. Dolichocentrum; Schlechter 1911

Type species
- Dendrobium furcatum

Species
- See text

= Dendrobium sect. Dolichocentrum =

Section of flowering plants

Dendrobium section Dolichocentrum is a section of the genus Dendrobium.

== Description ==
Plants in this section are pendulous and have thin and wiry stems

== Distribution ==
Plants from this section are found in Sulawesi and the Philippines.

== Species ==
Dendrobium section Dolichocentrum comprises the following species:

Image	Name	Distribution	Elevation (m)
	Dendrobium auriculatum Ames & Quisumb. 1932	Philippines (Luzon, Mindanao)	900–1,000 metres (3,000–3,300 ft)
	Dendrobium furcatum Reinw. ex Lindl. 1858	Sulawesi	600–1,800 metres (2,000–5,900 ft)
	Dendrobium miyasakii Ames & Quisumb. 1931	Philippines (Luzon)	600 metres (2,000 ft)
	Dendrobium papilio Loher 1897	Philippines (Luzon, Mindanao)	1,400–2,200 metres (4,600–7,200 ft)
	Dendrobium superans J.J.Sm. 1926 publ. 1927	Sulawesi	
