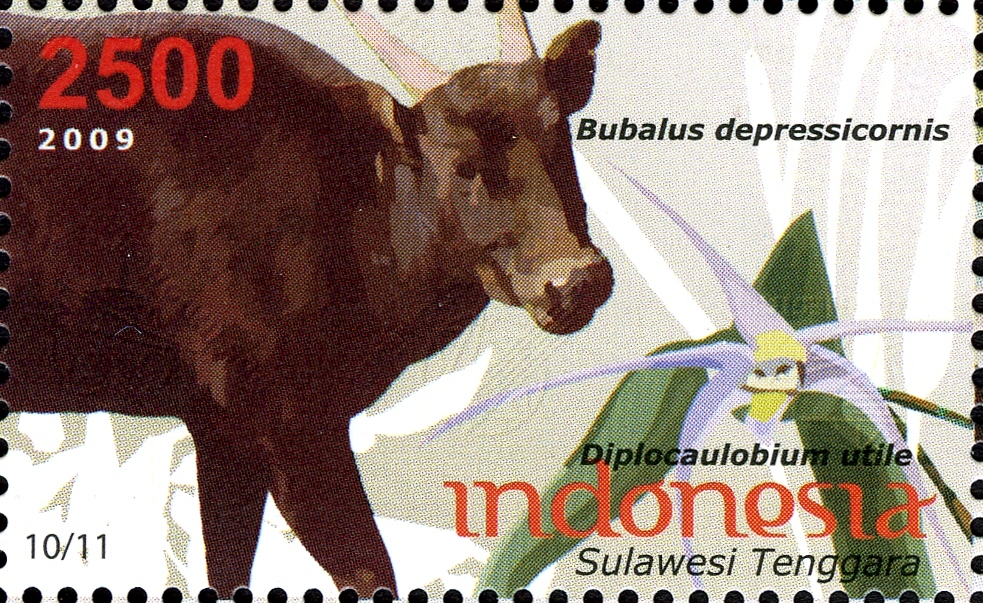
- Dendrobium utile and a lowland anoa (Bubalus depressicornis) on a 2009 stamp of Indonesia

Scientific classification
- Kingdom: Plantae
- Clade: Tracheophytes
- Clade: Angiosperms
- Clade: Monocots
- Order: Asparagales
- Family: Orchidaceae
- Subfamily: Epidendroideae
- Genus: Dendrobium
- Species: D. utile

Binomial name
- Dendrobium utile J.J.Sm.

Synonyms
- Diplocaulobium utile (J.J.Sm.) Kraenzl.

= Dendrobium utile =

Species of orchid from Southeast Asia

Dendrobium utile is a species of orchid native to Sulawesi and Papua, occurring in forests at altitudes of up to 150 m. It is the official flower of Sulawesi Tenggara. Locally in Sulawesi this orchid is also called anomi, anemi or alemi, toya in mee language, or anggrek serat (fiber orchid) in common Indonesian for its fiber-rich root.

== Description ==
Dendrobium utile is an epiphyte. It is distinguished from similar orchids by the root shaped like a bird nest with green-yellowish colors. The flowers grow in the leaf axils. The petals are yellow, with a narrow shape. The plants make attractive decorations, but are short-lived. The roots are used to make expensive handcrafts because of its soft texture and shiny and golden color.
