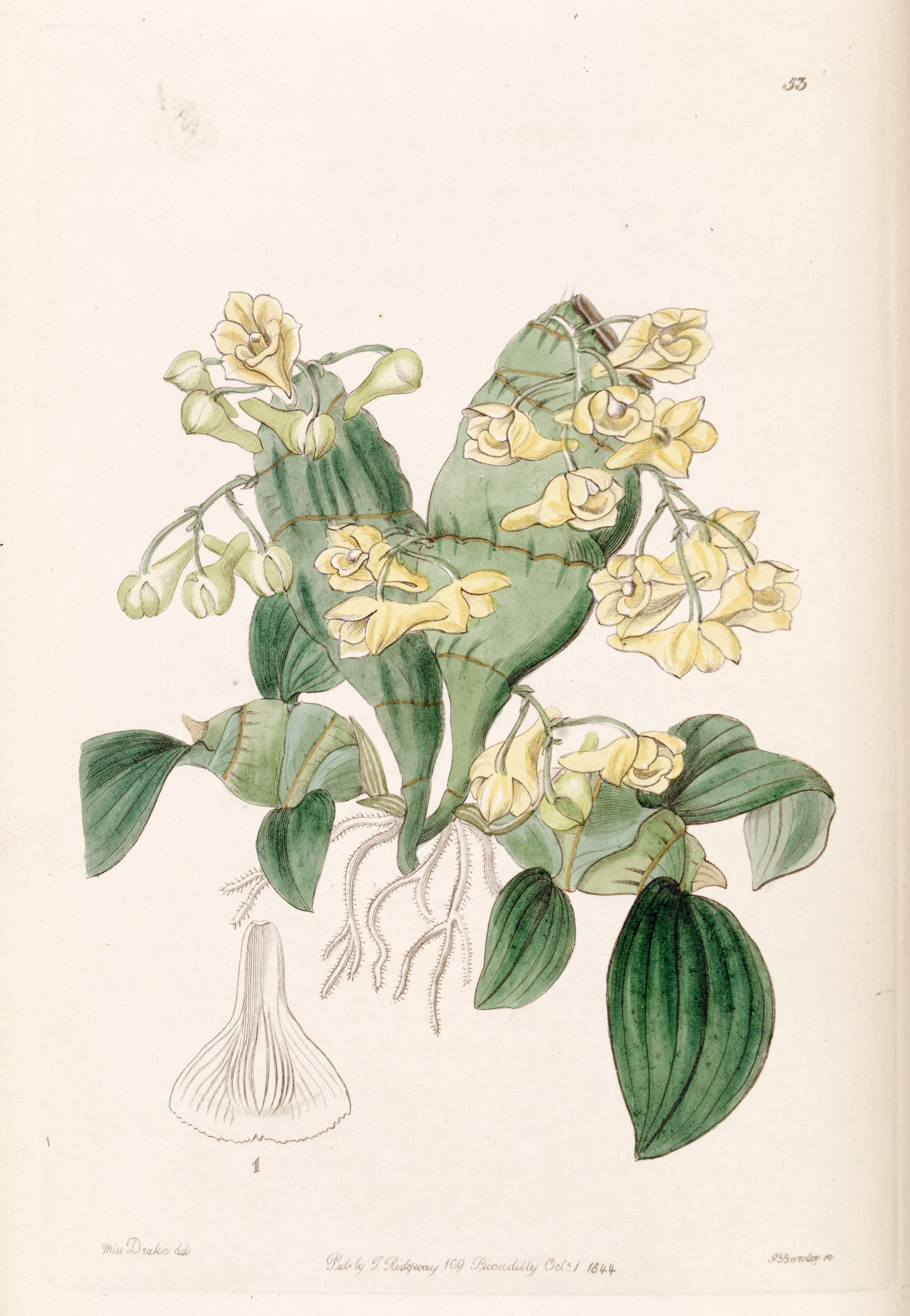
- 1844 illustration

Scientific classification
- Kingdom: Plantae
- Clade: Embryophytes
- Clade: Tracheophytes
- Clade: Angiosperms
- Clade: Monocots
- Order: Asparagales
- Family: Orchidaceae
- Subfamily: Epidendroideae
- Genus: Dendrobium
- Species: D. compressum

Binomial name
- Dendrobium compressum Lindl. (1842)

Synonyms
- Eurycaulis compressus (Lindl.) M.A.Clem. (2003)

= Dendrobium compressum =

Species of orchid

Dendrobium compressum is a species of orchid. It is native to Thailand, Malaysia, Myanmar, Borneo, Java, and Sumatra.
