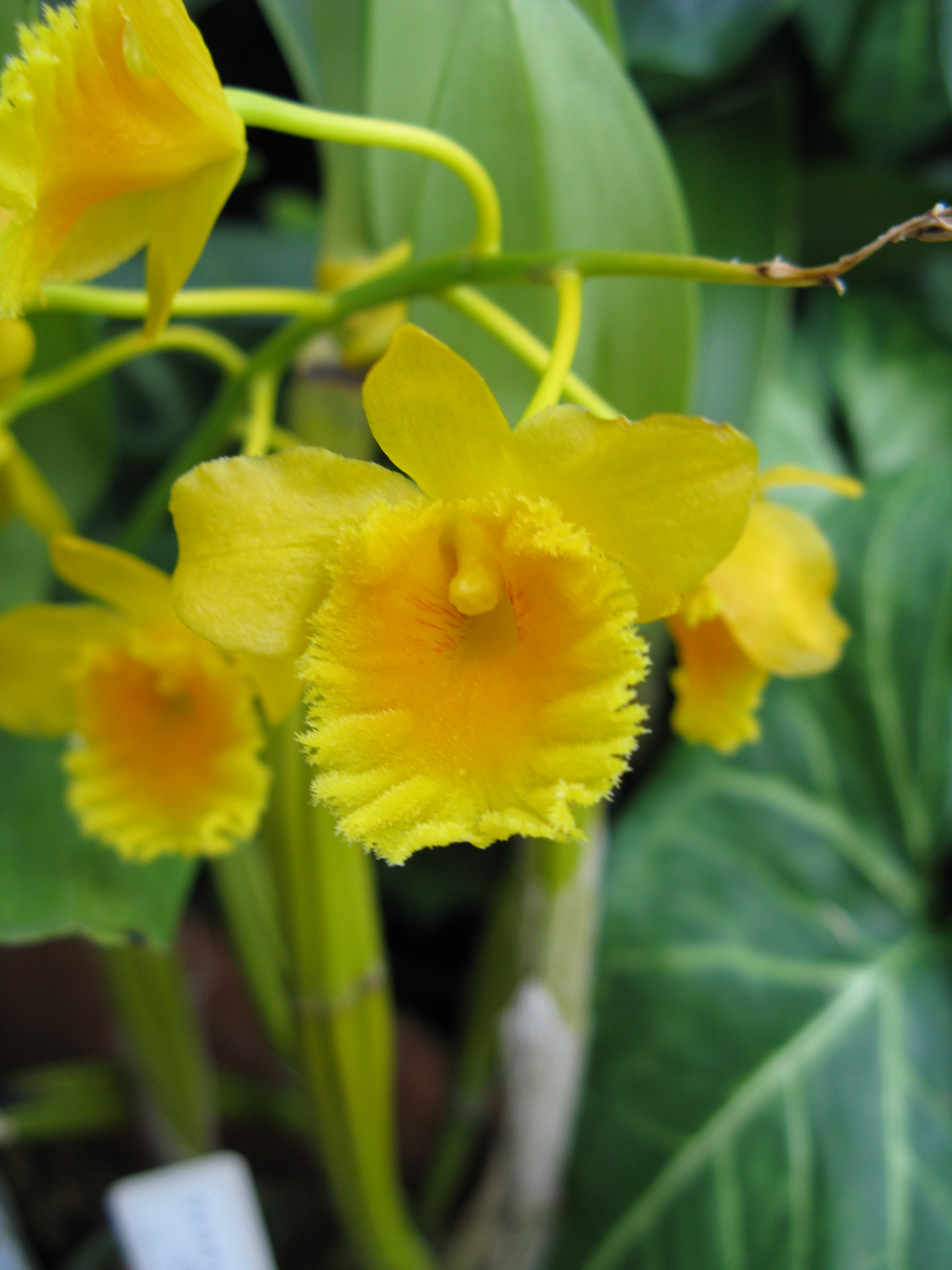

Conservation status
- CITES Appendix II (CITES)

Scientific classification
- Kingdom: Plantae
- Clade: Tracheophytes
- Clade: Angiosperms
- Clade: Monocots
- Order: Asparagales
- Family: Orchidaceae
- Subfamily: Epidendroideae
- Genus: Dendrobium
- Species: D. chrysotoxum

Binomial name
- Dendrobium chrysotoxum Lindl. (1847)

Synonyms
- Dendrobium chrysotoxum var. suavissimum (Rchb.f.) A.H.Kent in H.J.Veitch; Dendrobium suavissimum Rchb.f. (1874); Callista chrysotoxa (Lindl.) Kuntze (1891); Callista suavissima (Rchb.f.) Kuntze (1891)

= Dendrobium chrysotoxum =

Species of orchid

Dendrobium chrysotoxum (golden-bow dendrobium or fried-egg orchid) is a widely cultivated species of orchid. It is native to Southeast Asia, growing naturally in Myanmar, Bhutan, Yunnan, China, Manipur, Assam, India, Bangladesh, Andaman Islands, Laos, Nepal, Thailand, and Vietnam.
