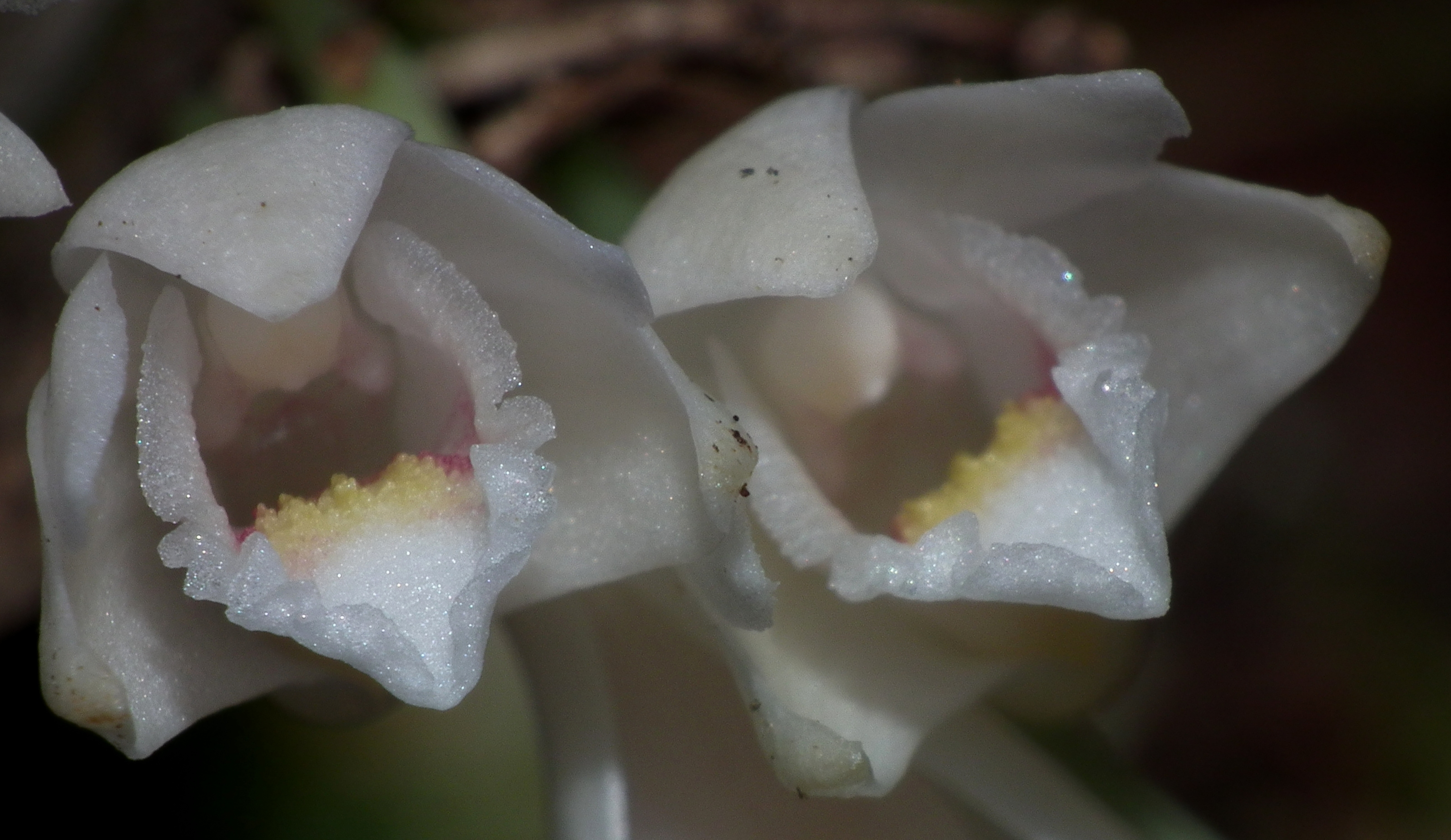

Scientific classification
- Kingdom: Plantae
- Clade: Tracheophytes
- Clade: Angiosperms
- Clade: Monocots
- Order: Asparagales
- Family: Orchidaceae
- Subfamily: Epidendroideae
- Genus: Dendrobium
- Species: D. milaniae

Binomial name
- Dendrobium milaniae Fessel & Lückel

Synonyms
- Eurycaulis milaniae (Fessel & Lückel) Fessel & Lückel; Eurycaulis milaniae (Fessel & Lückel) M.A.Clem.

= Dendrobium milaniae =

Species of orchid

Dendrobium milaniae (Dr. Paciencia Milan's dendrobium) is flower of the Orchid family found in Leyte, Visayas in the Philippines, where it is found growing as an epiphyte above bodies of water at elevations up to 600 metres. The flower grows to approximately 1.5 centimetres (0.59 in). The plant is semi-pendulous and sympodial. Pseudobulbs are 10 cm by 2 cm; 3 to 6 green lanceolate leaves are present on the top third of the pseudobulb. Hans Fessel and Emil Lückel named this species in 1996 in Die Orchidee.
