= Dendrobium platycaulon =

Scientific classification
- Kingdom: Plantae
- Clade: Embryophytes
- Clade: Tracheophytes
- Clade: Angiosperms
- Clade: Monocots
- Order: Asparagales
- Family: Orchidaceae
- Subfamily: Epidendroideae
- Genus: Dendrobium
- Species: D. platycaulon

Binomial name
- Dendrobium platycaulon Rolfe

Synonyms
- Pedilonum platycaulon (Rolfe) Rauschert; Eurycaulis platycaulos (Rolfe) Fessel & Lückel

Species of orchid

Dendrobium platycaulon is a species of orchid native to Borneo and the Philippines.
