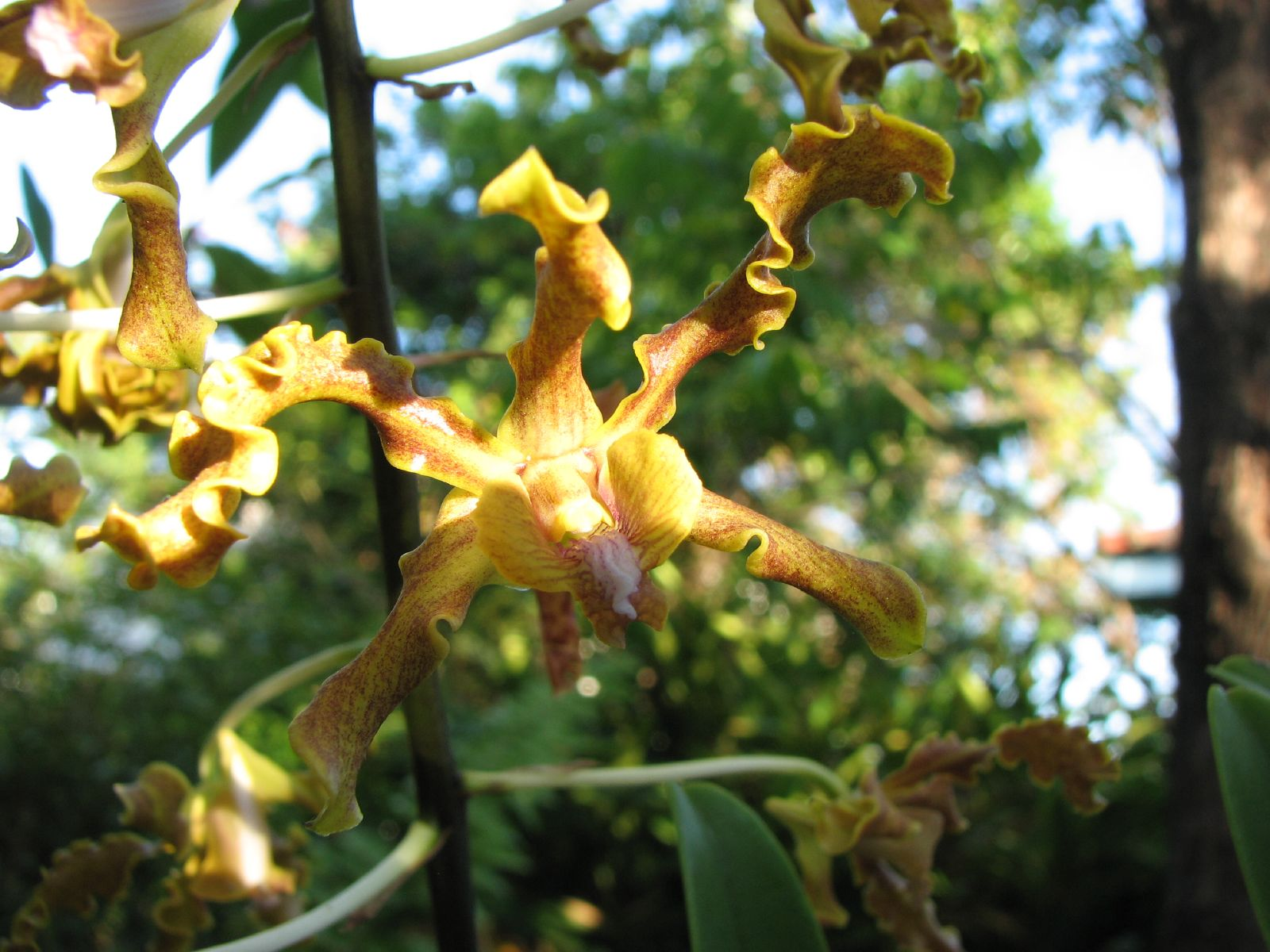

Conservation status
- Special Least Concern (NCA)

Scientific classification
- Kingdom: Plantae
- Clade: Embryophytes
- Clade: Tracheophytes
- Clade: Spermatophytes
- Clade: Angiosperms
- Clade: Monocots
- Order: Asparagales
- Family: Orchidaceae
- Subfamily: Epidendroideae
- Genus: Dendrobium
- Species: D. discolor

Binomial name
- Dendrobium discolor Lindl.

Synonyms
- List: Callista undulata Kuntze; Dendrobium broomfieldii (Fitzg.) Fitzg.; Dendrobium discolor f. broomfieldii (Fitzg.) Dockrill; Dendrobium discolor Lindl. f. discolor; Dendrobium discolor Lindl. subsp. discolor; Dendrobium discolor subsp. incurvata Liddle & P.I.Forst.; Dendrobium discolor var. broomfieldii D.L.Jones nom. inval.; Dendrobium discolor var. broomfieldii (Fitzg.) M.A.Clem. & D.L.Jones; Dendrobium discolor Lindl. var. discolor; Dendrobium discolor var. fuscum (Fitzg.) Dockrill; Dendrobium elobatum Rupp; Dendrobium fuscum Fitzg.; Dendrobium undulatum R.Br. nom. illeg.; Dendrobium undulatum var. broomfieldii Fitzg.; Dendrobium undulatum var. carterae F.M.Bailey; Durabaculum fuscum (Fitzg.) M.A.Clem. & D.L.Jones; Durabaculum undulatum (Kuntze) M.A.Clem. & D.L.Jones; Durabaculum undulatum var. broomfieldii (Fitzg.) M.A.Clem. & D.L.Jones; Durabaculum undulatum (R.Br.) M.A.Clem. & D.L.Jones var. undulatum

= Dendrobium discolor =

Antler orchid

Species of orchid

Dendrobium discolor, commonly known as antler orchid or golden orchid, is a species of epiphytic or lithophytic orchid in the family Orchidaceae, and are native to northern Australia, New Guinea, and part of Indonesia. It has cylindrical pseudobulbs, each with between ten and thirty five leathery leaves, and flowering stems with up to forty mostly brownish or greenish flowers with wavy and twisted sepals and petals.

== Description ==
Dendrobium discolor is an epiphytic or lithophytic herb with cylindrical green or yellowish pseudobulbs 1–5 m (3 ft 3 in – 16 ft 5 in) long, 30–60 mm (1.2–2.4 in) wide and occasionally over 8 cm (3 in) thick. There are between ten and thirty five leathery leaves 60–160 mm (2.4–6.3 in) long and 30–80 mm (1.2–3.1 in) wide. The flowering stem is 200–600 mm (7.9–23.6 in) long and bears between eight and forty light brown, reddish brown, dark brown or yellowish flowers. The flowers are 30–80 mm (1.2–3.1 in) long and wide with wavy and twisted sepals and petals. The sepals are 20–35 mm (0.79–1.38 in) long, and 4–7 mm (0.16–0.28 in) wide and the petals are 20–40 mm (0.79–1.57 in) long and 5–8 mm (0.20–0.31 in) wide. The labellum has mauve to purple markings and is 12–24 mm (0.47–0.94 in) long and 10–15 mm (0.39–0.59 in) wide with three main lobes. The side lobes are large and spread outwards or curve upwards and the middle lobe curves downwards and has at least three ridges and wavy edges. Flowering occurs from April to December.

== Taxonomy and naming ==
Dendrobium discolor was first formally described in 1841 by John Lindley and the description was published in Edwards's Botanical Register. The specific epithet (discolor) is a Latin word meaning "of different colours" or "variegated".

=== Infraspecific taxonomy ===
The following subspecies and varieties are accepted by Plants of the World Online as of March 2023:

- Dendrobium discolor var. broomfieldii (Fitzg.) A.D.Hawkes – or canary orchid has greenish yellow to bright golden yellow flowers from April to December, and occurs on the Whitsunday Islands.
- Dendrobium discolor Lindl. subsp. discolor – or golden antler orchid has light brown to dark brown, sometimes yellow to yellowish brown flowers with mauve to purple markings on the labellum, between August and November and occurs in Queensland, from the some Torres Strait Islands to Rockhampton.
- Dendrobium discolor var. fimbrilabium (Rchb.f.) Dockrill occurs in parts of Indonesia, New Guinea and Queensland.
- Dendrobium discolor var. fuscum (Fitzg.) Dockrill – or brown antler orchid has relatively small, reddish brown to dark brown flowers with mauve to purple markings on the labellum from April to December and occurs in Queensland, from the some Torres Strait Islands to Mackay.
- Dendrobium discolor subsp. incurvata. Liddle & P.I.Forst. occurs in Papua New Guinea and Queensland.

== Distribution and habitat ==
Antler orchid grows in coastal scrub and on mangroves, in coastal rainforest, and woodland, sometimes on rocks. It occurs in Queensland, including on the islands of the Great Barrier Reef, New Guinea as well as in the Maluku Islands and Sulawesi in Indonesia.

== Conservation Status ==
This species is listed as "Special Least Concern" under the Queensland Nature Conservation Act 1992.
