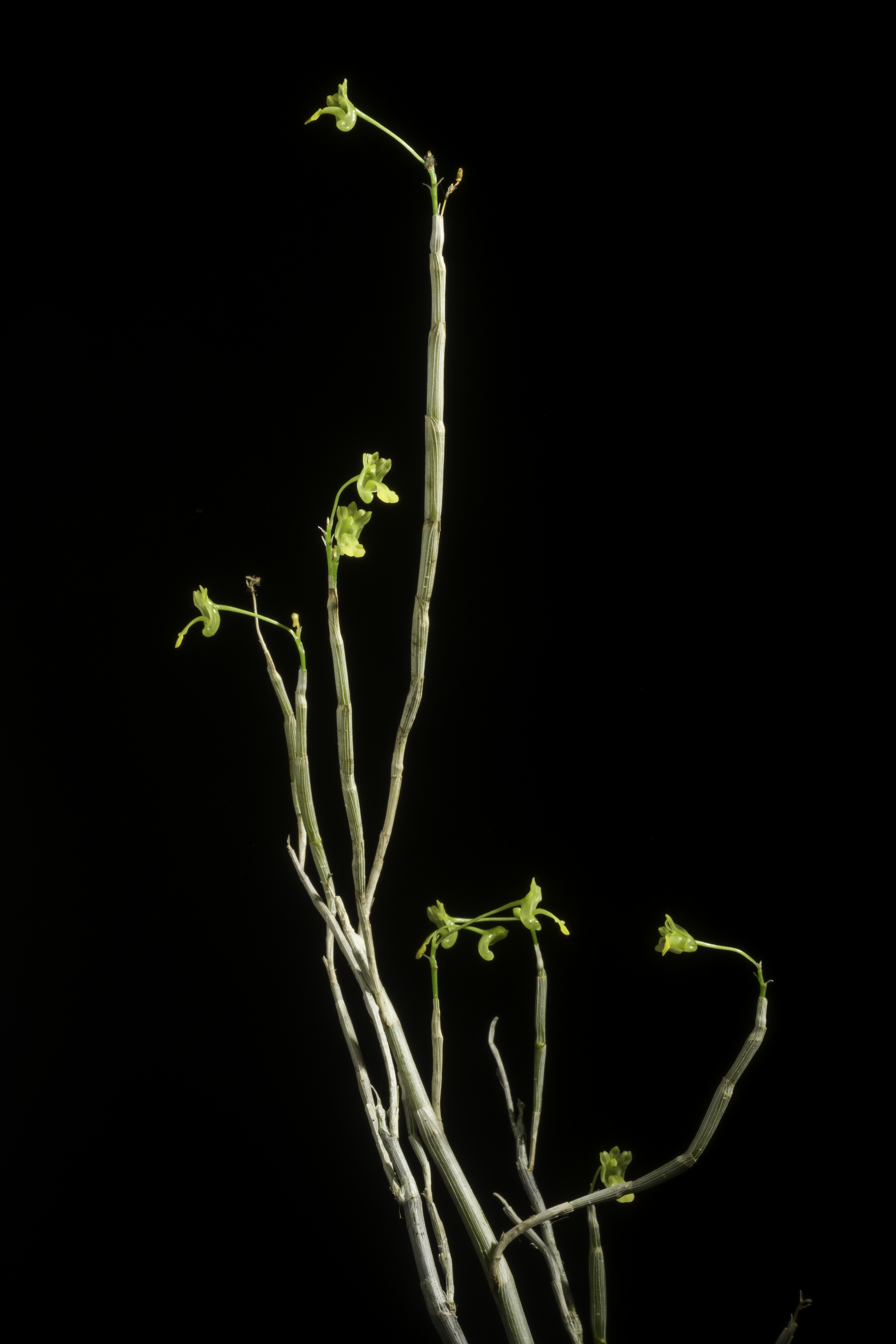
- Dendrobium parcum

Scientific classification
- Kingdom: Plantae
- Clade: Tracheophytes
- Clade: Angiosperms
- Clade: Monocots
- Order: Asparagales
- Family: Orchidaceae
- Subfamily: Epidendroideae
- Genus: Dendrobium
- Section: Dendrobium sect. Herbacea; Kraenzl. 1910

Type species
- Dendrobium herbaceum

Species
- See text

= Dendrobium sect. Herbacea =

Section of flowering plants

Dendrobium section Herbacea is a section of the genus Dendrobium.

== Description ==
Plants in this section have pseudobulbs with multiple linear branching deciduous stem with leaves on the terminal branches with flowers blooming on short racemes.

== Distribution ==
Plants from this section are found in southern India to Southeast Asia.

== Species ==
Dendrobium section Herbacea comprises the following species:

Image	Name	Distribution	Elevation (m)
	Dendrobium georgei J.Mathew 2014	India (Western Ghats)	1,250 metres (4,100 ft)
	Dendrobium herbaceum Lindl. 1840	India (Assam), Bangladesh, the Andaman Islands	600–1,300 metres (2,000–4,300 ft)
	Dendrobium heyneanum Lindl. 1830	India	1,400–1,700 metres (4,600–5,600 ft)
	Dendrobium parcum Rchb.f. 1866	Myanmar, Thailand and Vietnam	750–1,450 metres (2,460–4,760 ft)
