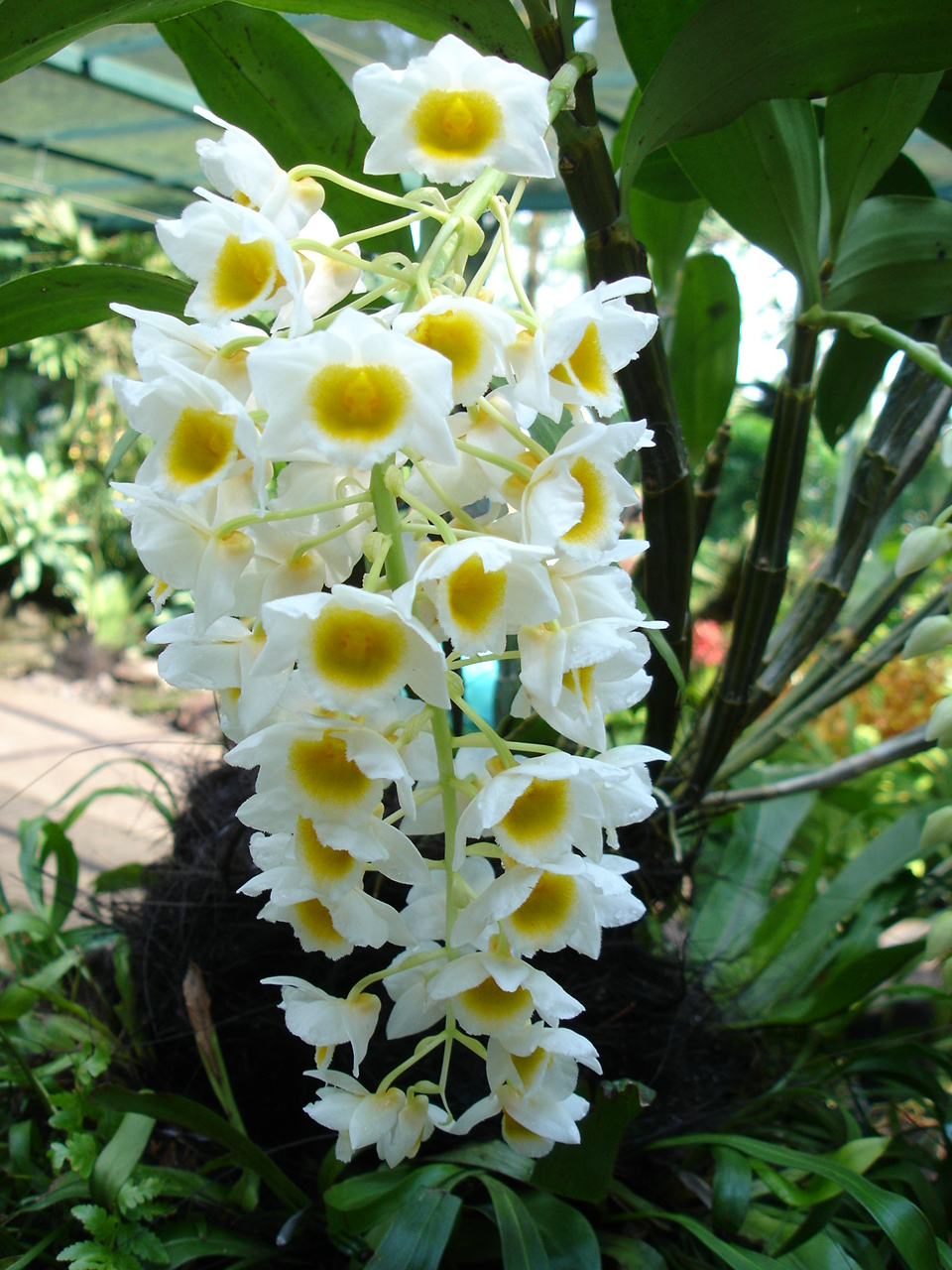

Scientific classification
- Kingdom: Plantae
- Clade: Tracheophytes
- Clade: Angiosperms
- Clade: Monocots
- Order: Asparagales
- Family: Orchidaceae
- Subfamily: Epidendroideae
- Genus: Dendrobium
- Species: D. farmeri

Binomial name
- Dendrobium farmeri Paxton (1849)

Synonyms
- Callista farmeri (Paxton) Kuntze (1891); Dendrobium densiflorum var. farmeri (Paxton) Regel; Dendrobium farmeri var. aureoflavum Hook.f; Dendrobium farmeri var. albiflorum C.Morren

= Dendrobium farmeri =

Farmer's dendrobium

Species of orchid

Dendrobium farmeri, commonly known as Farmer's dendrobium, and in Chinese as 石斛属 (shi hu shu), is a species of orchid native to Asia.

It is native to the Himalayas (Nepal, Bhutan, Assam, Arunachal Pradesh, India, Bangladesh) and Indochina (Thailand, Myanmar, Laos, Peninsular Malaysia, and Vietnam).
