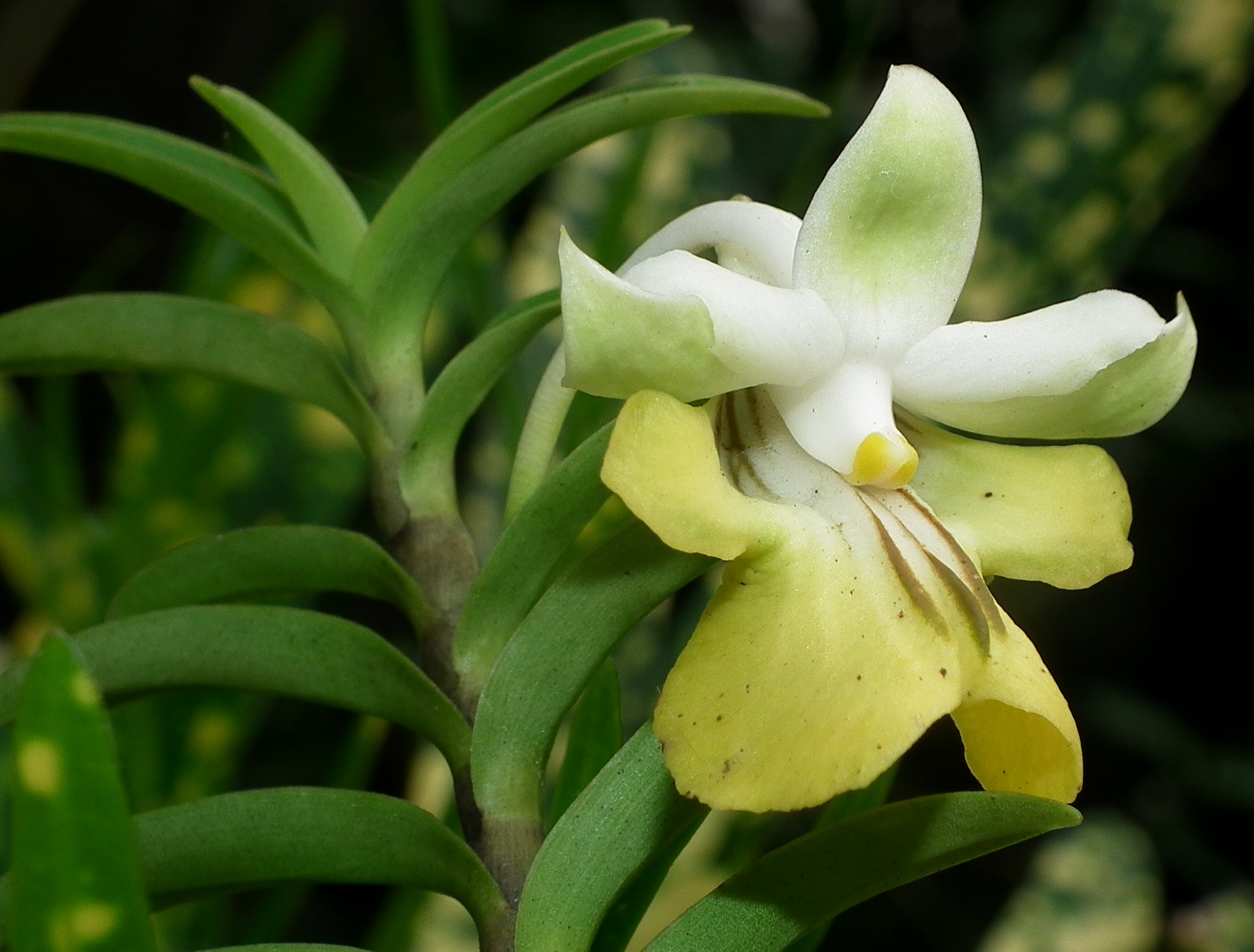

Scientific classification
- Kingdom: Plantae
- Clade: Tracheophytes
- Clade: Angiosperms
- Clade: Monocots
- Order: Asparagales
- Family: Orchidaceae
- Subfamily: Epidendroideae
- Genus: Dendrobium
- Species: D. uniflorum

Binomial name
- Dendrobium uniflorum Griff.

Synonyms
- Distichorchis uniflora (Griff.) M.A.Clem.; Dendrobium elephantinum Finet; Dendrobium tonkinense De Wild.; Dendrobium quadrisulcatum J.J.Sm.; Dendrobium uniflorum var. angustum Quisumb.; Distichorchis angusta (Quisumb.) M.A.Clem.; Distichorchis elephantina (Finet) M.A.Clem.; Distichorchis quadrisulcata (J.J.Sm.) M.A.Clem.

= Dendrobium uniflorum =

Species of orchid

Dendrobium uniflorum is a species of flowering plant in the family Orchidaceae. It is native to the Malesia and Southeast Asia regions, in Thailand, Vietnam, Malaysia, Philippines, Borneo, Sulawesi, Sumatra.

== Description ==
Dendrobium uniflorum is a small to medium size, warm growing epiphyte. It has thin, semi-pendulous to erect, clumping pseudobulbs that carry many, unsubdivided, pointed fleshy leaves.
