= Dendrobium macfarlanei =

Coastal shaggy orchid

Scientific classification
- Kingdom: Plantae
- Clade: Tracheophytes
- Clade: Angiosperms
- Clade: Monocots
- Order: Asparagales
- Family: Orchidaceae
- Subfamily: Epidendroideae
- Genus: Dendrobium
- Species: D. macfarlanei

Binomial name
- Dendrobium macfarlanei F.Muell.

Synonyms
- List: Aporopsis macfarlanei (F.Muell.) M.A.Clem. & D.L.Jones; Aporum macfarlanei (F.Muell.) Rauschert; Callista macfarlanei (F.Muell.) Kuntze; Ceraia macfarlanei (F.Muell.) M.A.Clem.; Aporopsis litoralis (Schltr.) M.A.Clem. & D.L.Jones; Aporum litorale (Schltr.) Rauschert; Ceraia litoralis (Schltr.) M.A.Clem.; Ceraia platybasis (Ridl.) M.A.Clem.; Dendrobium litorale Schltr.; Dendrobium platybasis Ridl.

Species of orchid

Dendrobium macfarlanei, commonly known as the coastal shaggy orchid, is an epiphytic orchid in the family Orchidaceae. It has a very short rhizome with crowded, slender stems with most of the leaves in the lower half. The leaves are flattened and pointed, the flowers small and pale greenish cream-coloured. It occurs on islands in the Torres Strait and in New Guinea.

== Description ==
Dendrobium macfarlanei is an epiphytic herb with very short rhizomes and crowded stems 300–600 mm (10–20 in) long and 5–10 mm (0.2–0.4 in) wide at the widest point. The leaves are arranged in two rows, and are flattened, fleshy and pointed 30–60 mm (1–2 in) long and 30–80 mm (1–3 in) wide. The flowers are arranged along leafless parts of the stem and are pale greenish cream, 10–15 mm (0.4–0.6 in) long and 10–12 mm (0.4–0.5 in) wide. The dorsal sepal is 4–5.5 mm (0.16–0.22 in) long, about 4 mm (0.16 in) wide and the lateral sepals are 8–10 mm (0.3–0.4 in) long and 4–5 mm (0.16–0.20 in) wide. The petals are 4–5 mm (0.16–0.20 in) long and about 2 mm (0.08 in) wide. The labellum is 10–12 mm (0.39–0.47 in) long, 7–10 mm (0.28–0.39 in) wide and has three lobes. The side lobes are blunt and the middle lobe has a central notch. Flowering occurs in April and July.

== Taxonomy and naming ==
Dendrobium macfarlanei was first formally described in 1876 by Ferdinand von Mueller in his book Descriptive Notes on Papuan Plants from specimens collected "on the Baxter-River" by "Rev. S. Macfarlane".

== Distribution and habitat ==
The coastal shaggy orchid grows on trees in lowland rainforest and beach scrub on Dauan Island in the Torres Strait and in New Guinea.
