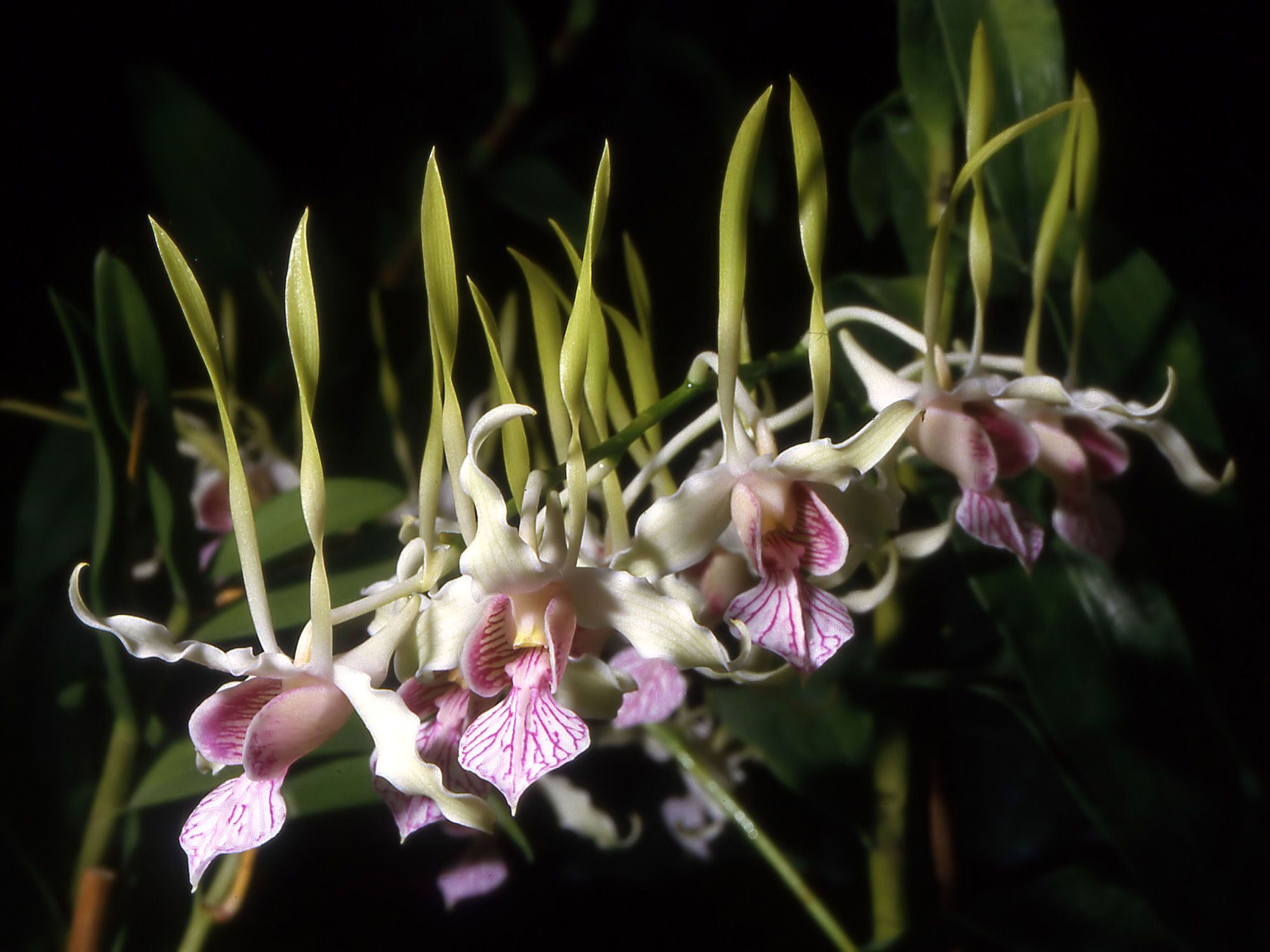

Conservation status
- Data Deficient (IUCN 3.1)

Scientific classification
- Kingdom: Plantae
- Clade: Tracheophytes
- Clade: Angiosperms
- Clade: Monocots
- Order: Asparagales
- Family: Orchidaceae
- Subfamily: Epidendroideae
- Genus: Dendrobium
- Species: D. stratiotes

Binomial name
- Dendrobium stratiotes Rchb.f.

Synonyms
- Callista stratiotes (Rchb.f.) Kuntze; Ceratobium stratiotes (Rchb.f.) M.A.Clem. & D.L.Jones

= Dendrobium stratiotes =

Species of dendrobium

Dendrobium stratiotes is an epiphytic orchid (family Orchidaceae) native to the rainforests of New Guinea. It is especially noteworthy for having the longest lasting flowers of any plant, individual flowers at Kew Gardens in Surrey, near London, having remained fresh for as long as nine months.
