= Dendrobium affine =

White butterfly orchid

Scientific classification
- Kingdom: Plantae
- Clade: Tracheophytes
- Clade: Angiosperms
- Clade: Monocots
- Order: Asparagales
- Family: Orchidaceae
- Subfamily: Epidendroideae
- Genus: Dendrobium
- Species: D. affine

Binomial name
- Dendrobium affine (Decne.) Steud.

Synonyms
- Callista affinis (Decne.) Kuntze; Onychium affine Decne.; Vappodes affinis (Decne.) M.A.Clem. & D.L.Jones; Callista leucolophota (Rchb.f.) Kuntze; Dendrobium leucolophotum Rchb.f.; Dendrobium urvillei Finet; Vappodes dicupha (F.Muell.) M.A.Clem. & D.L.Jones

Species of orchid

Dendrobium affine, commonly known as the white butterfly orchid, malakmalak or matngala in Australian Aboriginal languages, is an epiphytic orchid in the family Orchidaceae. It has cylindrical pseudobulbs, each with up to ten leaves and flowering stems with up to twenty white flowers with yellow or purple markings on the labellum. It occurs in northern Australia, New Guinea and Timor, where it grows on the bark of trees.

== Description ==
Dendrobium affine is an epiphytic herb with cylindrical green pseudobulbs 200–700 mm (8–30 in) long and 15–25 mm (0.6–1 in) wide with between two and ten leaves on its upper half. The leaves are 80–200 mm (3–8 in) long and 20–30 mm (0.79–1.2 in) wide. The flowering stem is 200–500 mm (8–20 in) long and bears between two and twenty white flowers 20–30 mm (0.79–1.2 in) long and 25–45 mm (1–2 in) wide. The sepals are 16–20 mm (0.63–0.79 in) long, and 6–8 mm (0.24–0.31 in) wide with the lateral sepals slightly wider than the dorsal sepal. The petals are about the same length as the sepals but broader. The labellum is yellow with purple markings, about 20 mm (0.8 in) long, 6 mm (0.2 in) wide and has three lobes. The side lobes are upright and the middle lobe often curves downwards and has five ridges along its midline. Flowering occurs from March to August.

== Taxonomy and naming ==
The white tea tree orchid was first formally described in 1834 by Joseph Decaisne who gave it the name Onychium affine and published the description in Nouvelles annales du Muséum d'histoire naturelle. In 1840 Ernst Gottlieb von Steudel changed the name to Dendrobium affine in his book Nomenclator Botanicus. The specific epithet (affine) is a Latin word meaning "related to" or "neighbouring".

== Distribution and habitat ==
Dendrobium affine is a bark epiphyte and grows on trees in moist places such as rainforest, on stream banks and in paperbark swamps. It is found in northern parts of the Northern Territory including Melville Island, the Kimberley region of Western Australia, and the Moluccas. It occurred on Timor in the past but may now be extinct there.
