= Dendrobium mindanaense =

Scientific classification
- Kingdom: Plantae
- Clade: Tracheophytes
- Clade: Angiosperms
- Clade: Monocots
- Order: Asparagales
- Family: Orchidaceae
- Subfamily: Epidendroideae
- Genus: Dendrobium
- Species: D. mindanaense

Binomial name
- Dendrobium mindanaense Ames

Synonyms
- Aporum mindanaense (Ames) M.A.Clem.; Ceraia mindanaensis (Ames) Suárez

Species of orchid

Dendrobium mindanaense, known as the Mindanao dendrobium, is an orchid species that is found on the Philippines. It was named for the island of Mindanao.
