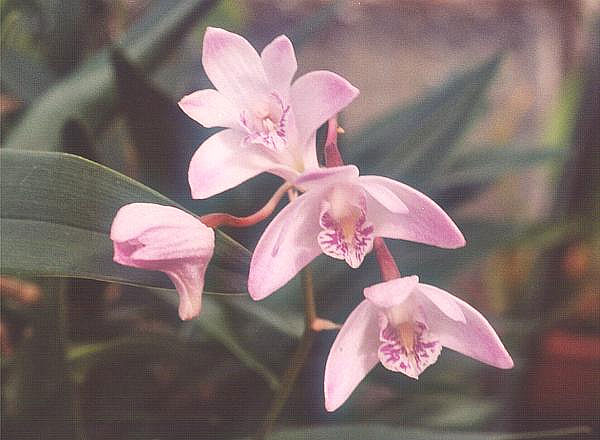
- Dendrobium kingianum

Scientific classification
- Kingdom: Plantae
- Clade: Tracheophytes
- Clade: Angiosperms
- Clade: Monocots
- Order: Asparagales
- Family: Orchidaceae
- Subfamily: Epidendroideae
- Tribe: Malaxideae
- Subtribe: Dendrobiinae
- Genus: Dendrobium; Sw.

Type species
- Dendrobium moniliforme (L.) Sw.

Species
- About 1,600; see List of Dendrobium species

Synonyms
- List: Abaxianthus M.A.Clem. & D.L.Jones; Aclinia Griff.; Amblyanthe Rauschert; Amblyanthus (Schltr.) Brieger; Anisopetala (Kraenzl.) M.A.Clem.; Aporopsis (Schltr.) M.A.Clem. & D.L.Jones; Aporum Blume; Asarum Archila; Australorchis Brieger; Bolbodium Brieger; Bouletia M.A.Clem. & D.L.Jones; Cadetia Gaudich.; Callista Lour.; Cannaeorchis M.A.Clem. & D.L.Jones; Cepobaculum M.A.Clem. & D.L.Jones; Ceraia Lour.; Ceratobium (Lindl.) M.A.Clem. & D.L.Jones; Chromatotriccum M.A.Clem. & D.L.Jones; Coelandria Fitzg.; Conostalix (Kraenzl.) Brieger; Davejonesia M.A.Clem.; Dendrobates M.A.Clem. & D.L.Jones; Dendrocoryne (Lindl.) Brieger; Desmotrichum Blume; Dichopus Blume; Diplocaulobium (Rchb.f.) Kraenzl.; Distichorchis M.A.Clem. & D.L.Jones; Ditulima Raf.; Dockrillia Brieger; × Dockrilobium J.M.H.Shaw; Dolichocentrum (Schltr.) Brieger; Durabaculum M.A.Clem. & D.L.Jones; Eleutheroglossum (Schltr.) M.A.Clem. & D.L.Jones; Endeisa Raf.; Ephemerantha P.F.Hunt & Summerh.; Epigeneium Gagnep.; Eriopexis (Schltr.) Brieger; Euphlebium (Kraenzl.) Brieger; Eurycaulis M.A.Clem. & D.L.Jones; Exochanthus M.A.Clem. & D.L.Jones; Flickingeria A.D.Hawkes; Froscula Raf.; Gersinia Néraud; Goldschmidtia Dammer; Grastidium Blume; Herpetophytum (Schltr.) Brieger; Hibiscorchis Archila & Vinc.Bertolini; Inobulbon Schltr. & Kraenzl.; Keranthus Lour. ex Endl.; Kinetochilus (Schltr.) Brieger; Latourea Blume; Latourorchis Brieger; Leioanthum M.A.Clem. & D.L.Jones; Maccraithea M.A.Clem. & D.L.Jones; Macrostomium Blume; Microphytanthe (Schltr.) Brieger; Monanthos (Schltr.) Brieger; Onychium Blume; Ormostema Raf.; Orthoglottis Breda; Oxyglossellum M.A.Clem. & D.L.Jones; Pedilonum Blume; Pierardia Raf.; Sarcocadetia (Schltr.) M.A.Clem. & D.L.Jones; Sayeria Kraenzl.; Schismoceras C.Presl; Stachyobium Rchb.f.; Stelbophyllum D.L.Jones & M.A.Clem.; Stilbophyllum D.L.Jones & M.A.Clem.; Tetrabaculum M.A.Clem. & D.L.Jones; Tetrodon (Kraenzl.) M.A.Clem. & D.L.Jones; Thelychiton Endl.; Thicuania Raf.; Trachyrhizum (Schltr.) Brieger; Tropilis Raf.; × Vappaculum M.A.Clem. & D.L.Jones; Vappodes M.A.Clem. & D.L.Jones; Winika M.A.Clem., D.L.Jones & Molloy

= Dendrobium =

Genus of orchids

Dendrobium is a genus of mostly epiphytic and lithophytic orchids in the family Orchidaceae. It is a very large genus, containing more than 1,800 species that are found in diverse habitats throughout much of south, east and southeast Asia, including China, Japan, India, the Philippines, Indonesia, Australia, New Guinea, Vietnam and many of the islands of the Pacific. Orchids in this genus have roots that creep over the surface of trees or rocks, rarely having their roots in soil. Up to six leaves develop in a tuft at the tip of a shoot and from one to a large number of flowers are arranged along an unbranched flowering stem. Several attempts have been made to separate Dendrobium into smaller genera, but most have not been accepted by the World Checklist of Selected Plant Families.

== Description ==
Dendrobium species are mostly epiphytic, or lithophytic although a few species are terrestrial. They are sympodial herbs with cylindrical roots usually arising from the base of a pseudobulb. The pseudobulbs, when present, are hard, sometimes cane-like, cylindrical or cone-shaped and more or less covered with the bases of the leaves. There are from one to many leaves arranged in two ranks, the leaves varying in shape from linear to oblong, sometimes cylindrical but never channelled or grooved. They are usually much longer than wide and last for only a single season.

Between one and a large number of resupinate or non-resupinate flowers are arranged along an unbranched flowering stem and may be short or long-lived. The flowers may be white, green, yellow, or pink to purple, often with contrasting colours in the labellum. The sepals and petals are usually free from and more or less similar to each other but markedly different from the labellum. The labellum is more or less egg-shaped, with the narrower end towards the base and flanks the column. There is often a callus consisting of narrow, parallel ridges, in the centre of the labellum.

== Taxonomy and naming ==
The genus Dendrobium was first formally described in 1799 by Olof Swartz and the description was published in Nova Acta Regiae Societatis Scientiarum Upsaliensis. The name Dendrobium is derived from the ancient Greek words dendron meaning "tree" and bios meaning "life", referring to the epiphytic habit of most species.

In 1981, Friedrich Brieger reclassified all terete-leaved dendrobiums from Australia and New Guinea into a new genus Dockrillia, and in 2002 David Jones and Mark Clements separated the genus into smaller genera, including Thelychiton, Tropilis, Vappodes and Winika, but all of these genera are regarded as synonyms by the World Checklist of Selected Plant Families.

=== Sections ===
The genus Dendrobium was first divided into sections for infrageneric classification by Rudolf Schlechter in 1911–1914 based on morphological characteristics. Later on DNA markers were used to define the sections from work by Yukawa and colleagues from 1993 to 2001.

- Amblyanthus
- Aporum
- Breviflora
- Brevisaccata
- Bolbodium
- Calcarifera
- Calyptrochilus
- Crumenata
- Conostalix
- Dendrobium
- Dendrocoryne
- Densiflora
- Distichophyllae
- Dolichocentrum
- Formosae
- Fytchianthe
- Grastidium
- Herbacea
- Herpethophytum
- Holochrysa
- Latouria
- Microphytanthe
- Pedilonum
- Phalaenanthe
- Platycaulon
- Rhizobium
- Spatulata
- Stachyobium
- Stuposa

== Distribution and habitat ==
Orchids in the genus Dendrobium have adapted to a wide variety of habitats, from the high altitudes in the Himalayan mountains to lowland tropical forests and even to the dry climate of the Australian desert.

== Uses ==
=== Use in horticulture ===
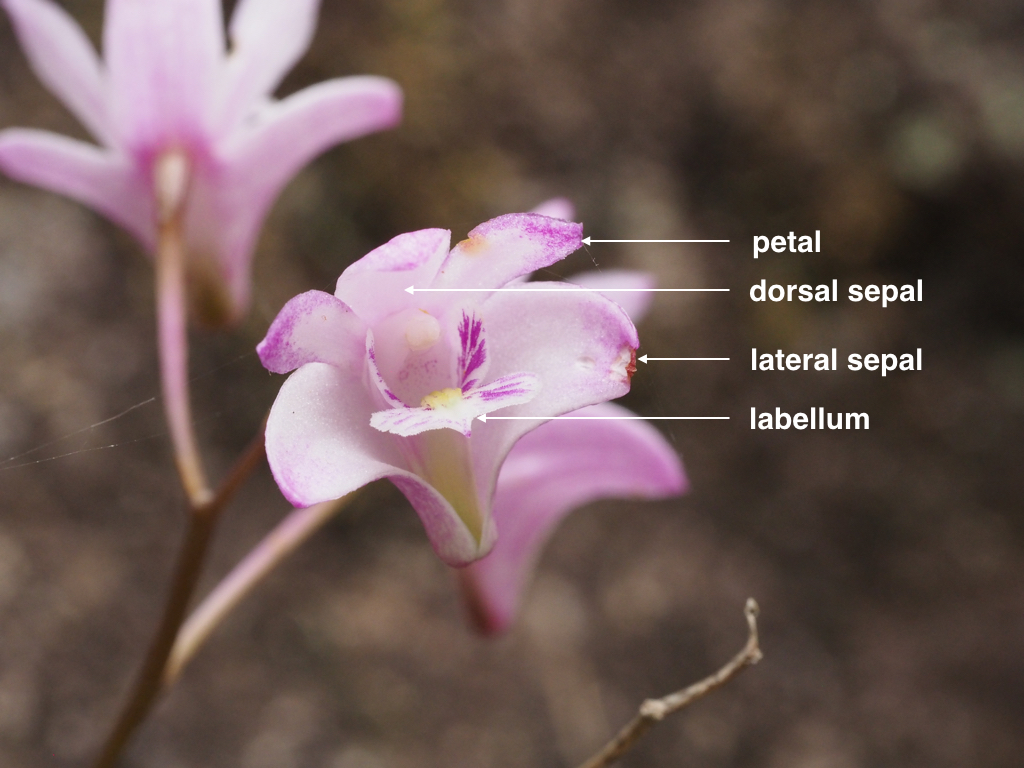
Labelled diagram of Dendrobium kingianum

Dendrobium is abbreviated as Den. by the Royal Horticultural Society. Some species are in great demand by orchid collectors. This has resulted in numerous varieties and hybrids, such as the noble dendrobium (Den. nobile) breeds, which have greatly extended the range of colours of the original plant from the Himalayas. The flowers of Dendrobium stratiotes are known to remain fresh for nine months.

Many Dendrobium species are known to filter toluene and xylene from the air.

Several hybrids in this genus have been registered and given cultivar names after notable persons and institutions:

- Dendrobium 'Ismail Sabri Yaakob'
- Dendrobium 'Bae Yong-joon'
- Dendrobium 'SCCCI 100th Anniversary'
- Dendrobium 'Margaret Thatcher'
- Dendrobium 'Iriana Jokowi'
- Dendrobium 'Joseph Schooling'
- Dendrobium 'Yip Pin Xiu'

The grex Dendrobium Berry gx has received the Royal Horticultural Society's Award of Garden Merit.

=== Medicinal uses ===
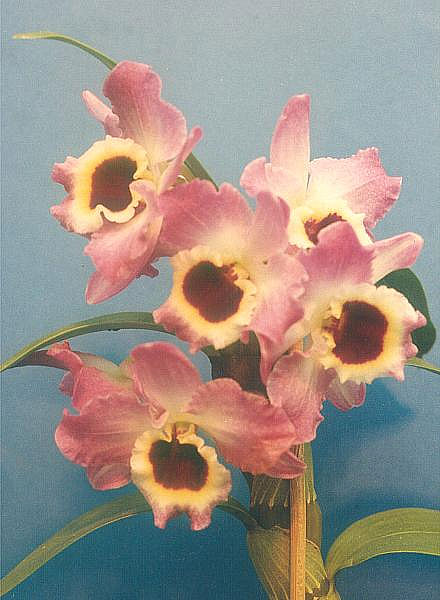
A nobile-type cultivar or hybrid. Dendrobium nobile has been extensively bred in the horticultural industry, resulting in cultivars and hybrids with exceptional flower count and various patterning.

Some Dendrobium species are cultivated as medicinal plants. The noble dendrobium (D. nobile) for example is one of the 50 fundamental herbs used in traditional Chinese medicine, where it is known as shí hú (石斛) or shí hú lán (石斛兰).

The 1889 book 'The Useful Native Plants of Australia records that Dendrobium canaliculatum was called "yamberin" by the Indigenous People of Queensland, Australia and that "The bulbous stems, after being deprived of the old leaves are edible (Thozet)."

=== In culture ===
Many species and cultivars of this genus are well-known floral emblems and have been figured in artwork. Among the former are:

- Dendrobium formosum (beautiful giant-flowered dendrobium) – emblem of Ranong Province (Thailand)
- Dendrobium 'Kim il Sung' (Kimilsungia) – emblem of North Korea
- Dendrobium moniliforme (Sekikoku) – emblem of Matsushima, Miyagi (Japan)
- Dendrobium nobile (noble dendrobium) – emblem of Sikkim (India)
- Dendrobium bigibbum (Cooktown orchid, anggrek larat) – emblem of Maluku province (Indonesia) and Queensland (Australia).
- Dendrobium utile (locally known as anggrek serat) – emblem of the Indonesian province of South East Sulawesi

The Cooktown orchid was figured on Australian stamps in 1968 and 1998, and flowers of several Dendrobium greges are depicted on the obverse side of the Singapore Orchid Series currency notes issued between 1967 and 1976:

- Dendrobium Marjorie Ho – S$10
- Dendrobium Shangri-La – S$500
- Dendrobium Kimiyo Kondo – S$1000

The golden-bow dendrobium (D. chrysotoxum), colloquially called fried-egg orchid was one of the species grown by the fictional private detective and orchid fancier Nero Wolfe, and plays a role in The Final Deduction.

== Gallery ==
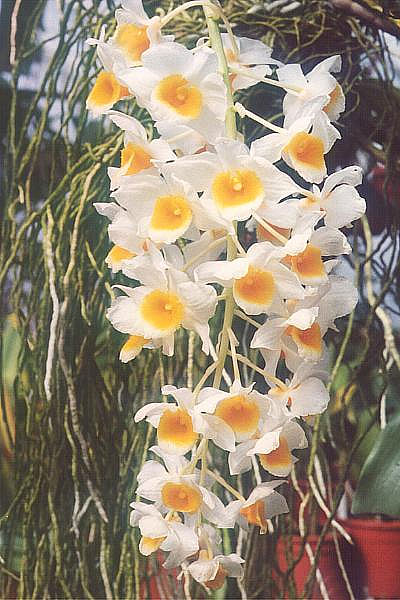
Dendrobium Chet's Choice (Dendrobium densiflorum × farmeri), a hybrid belonging to the section Densiflorum (syn. Callista)

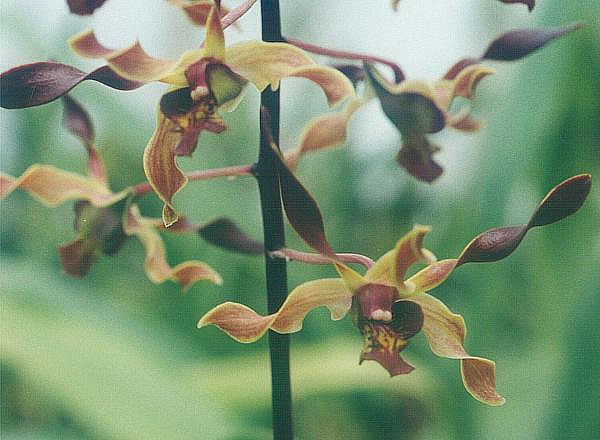
Dendrobium 'Mini Brown', a hybrid belonging to the section Spatulata

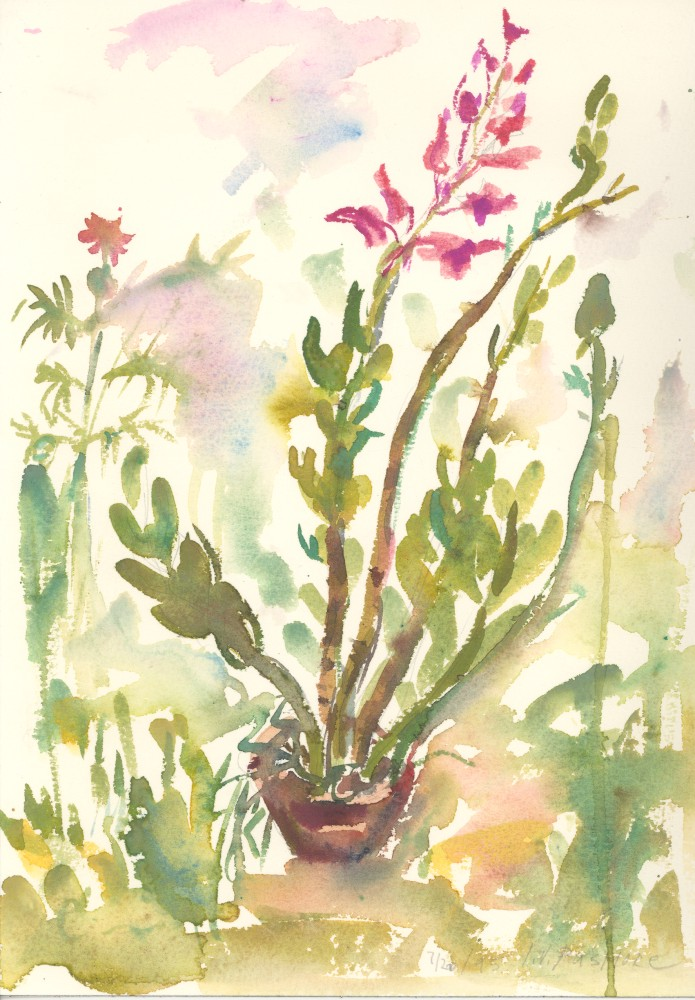
Painting of a typical Dendrobium by I. V. Passmoore, probably the hybrid Dendrobium Lucky Seven

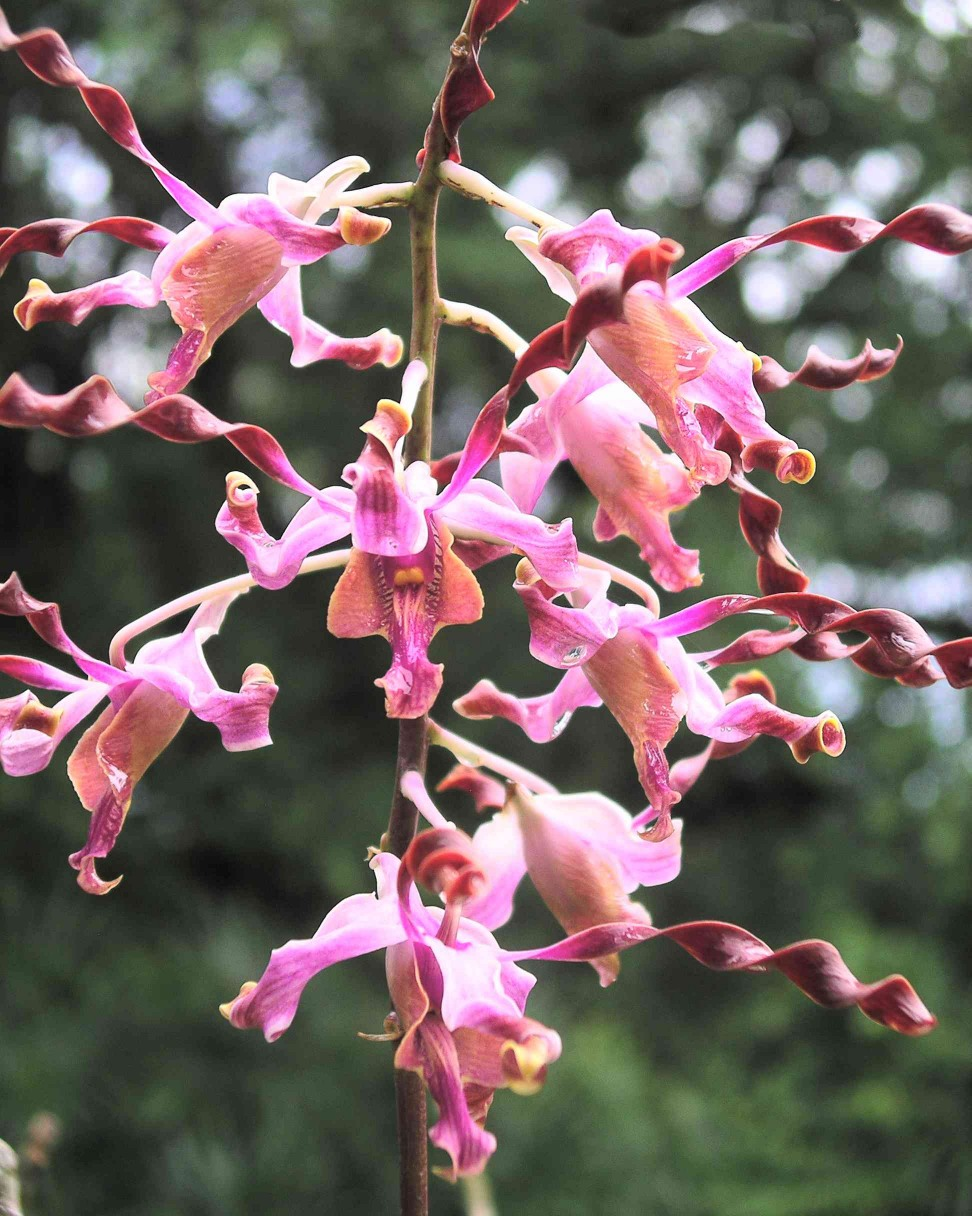
Dendrobium Margaret Thatcher, a hybrid belonging to the section Spatulata

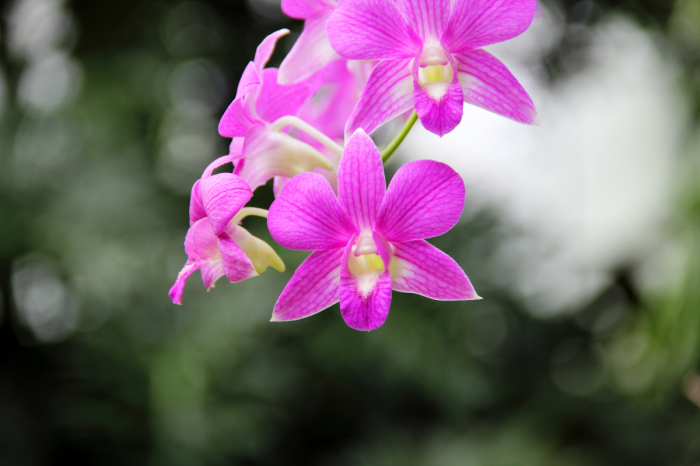
Dendrobium hybrid belonging to the section Phalaenanthe

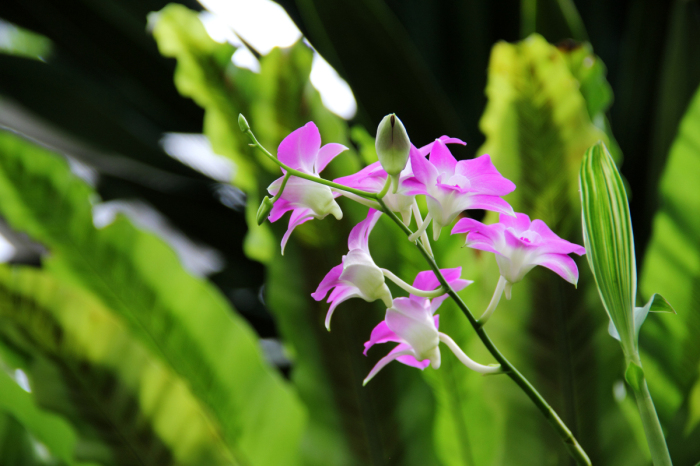
Dendrobium hybrid

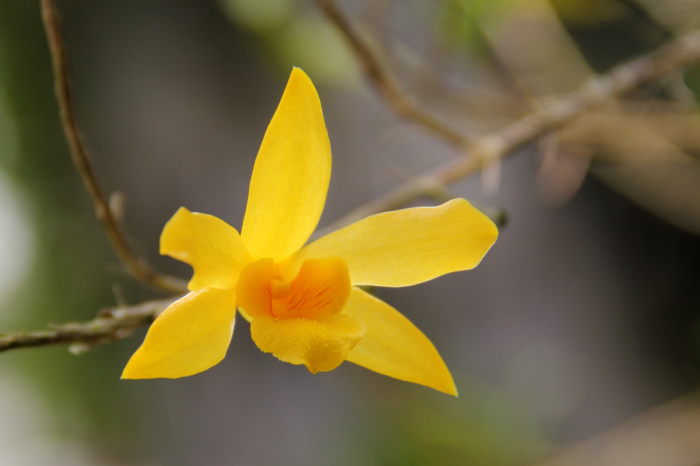
Dendrobium salaccense

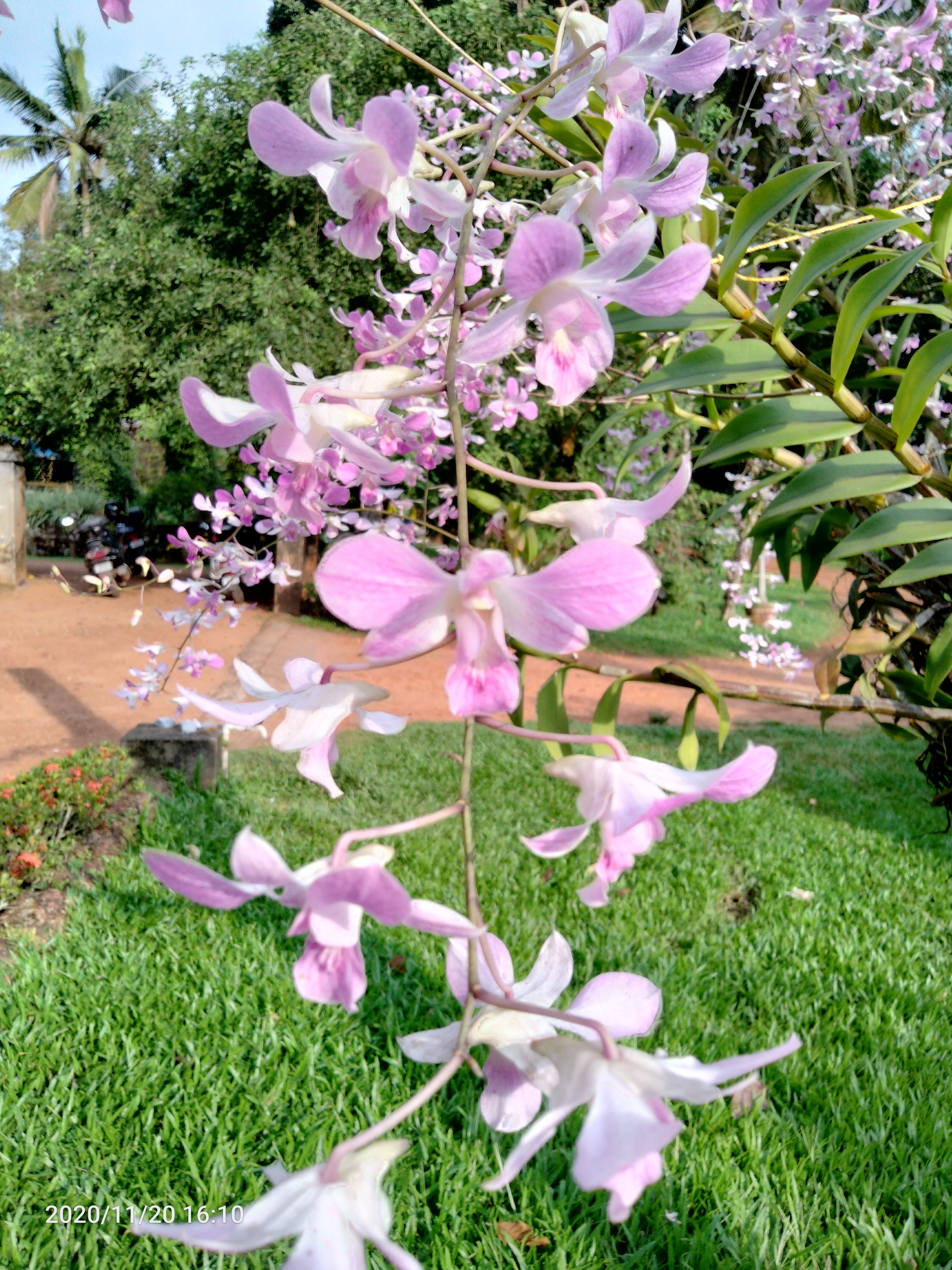
Dendrobium from Kottayam

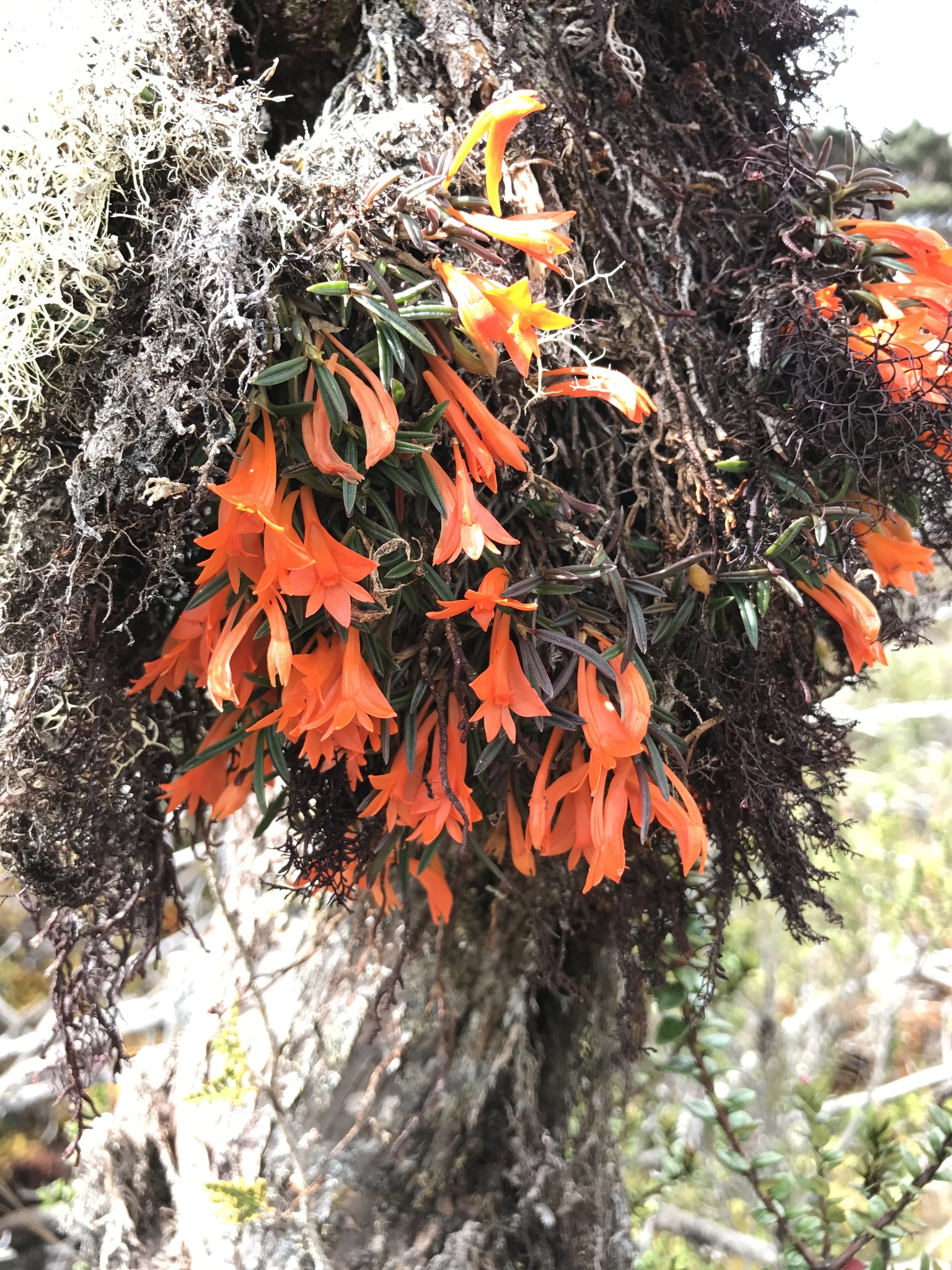
Dendrobium dekockii from Papua uploaded to iNaturalist by william_hoyer
