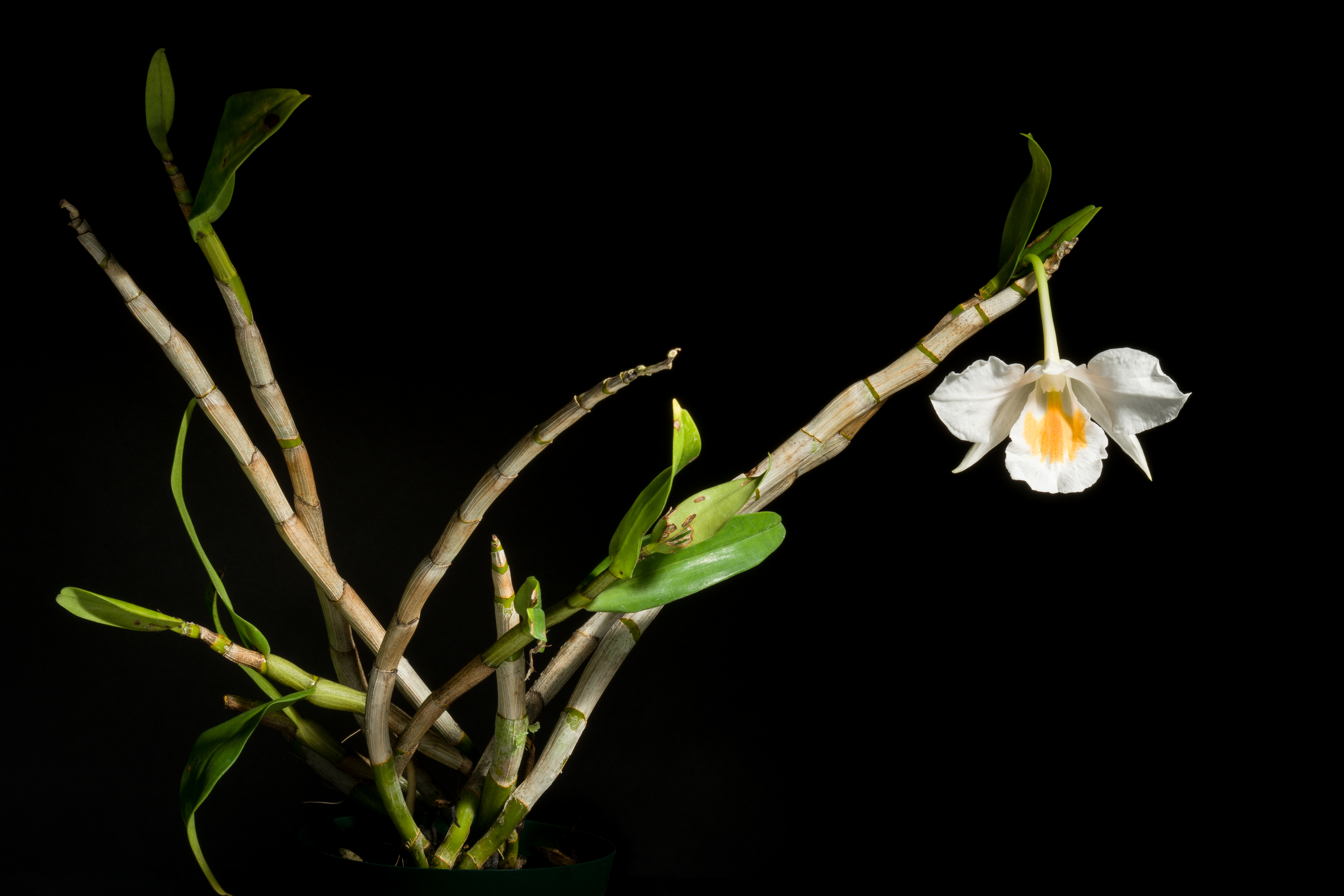
- Dendrobium formosum

Scientific classification
- Kingdom: Plantae
- Clade: Tracheophytes
- Clade: Angiosperms
- Clade: Monocots
- Order: Asparagales
- Family: Orchidaceae
- Subfamily: Epidendroideae
- Genus: Dendrobium
- Section: Dendrobium sect. Formosae (Benth. & Hook.f.) Hook.f.

Type species
- Dendrobium formosum

Species
- See text

Synonyms
- Froscula Raf 1936(1938); Dendrobium sect. Eudendrobium subsect. Formosae Benth & Hkr.f. 1883; Dendrobium sect. Oxgenianthe Schlechter 1912; Dendrobium sect. Nigrohirsutae Lindley 1859; Dendrobium sect. Nigrohirsutae (Lindley) Brieger 1981; Dendrobium subg. Nigrohirsutae (Lindley) Kraenzl 1910; Dendrobium ser. Formosa Bentham & J. D. Hooker 1883

= Dendrobium sect. Formosae =

Section of flowering plants

Dendrobium section Formosae is a section of the genus Dendrobium.

== Description ==
Plants in this section have long pseudobulbs with black hairs on their leaf sheaths. Pseudobulbs bloom with 1-3 flowers and have three lobes at the apex of the lip.

== Distribution ==
Plants from this section are found from India through Southeast Asia to the Philippines and Borneo.

== Species ==
Dendrobium section Formosae comprises the following species:

Image	Name	Distribution	Elevation (m)
	Dendrobium ayubii J.B.Comber & J.J.Wood1999	Sumatra	
	Dendrobium bellatulum Rolfe1903	China (Yunnan), Myanmar, Thailand, Laos (Champasak) and Vietnam (Dak Lac, Kon Tum, Lam Dong, Ninh Thuan)	600–2,000 metres (2,000–6,600 ft)
	Dendrobium bostrychodes Rchb.f. 1880	Borneo (Kalimantan)	
	Dendrobium cariniferum Rchb.f. 1869	China (Yunnan), India (Assam), Myanmar, Thailand, Cambodia, Laos (Bolikhamxai, Phongsali, Vientiane) and Vietnam (Dak Lak, Dak Nong, Kon Tum, Lam Dong)	500–1,500 metres (1,600–4,900 ft)
	Dendrobium carmindae M.Leon, Cootes & R.Boos 2016	Philippines (Mindanao)	800–880 metres (2,620–2,890 ft)
	Dendrobium chapaense Aver.2006	Vietnam (Lai Chau, Lao Cai). India, China (Yunnan)	1,500–2,000 metres (4,900–6,600 ft)
	Dendrobium christyanum Rchb.f. 1882	Vietnam (Khanh Hoa, Kon Tum, Lam Dong, Nghe An, Ninh Thuan), Thailand, China (Yunnan) ||1,000–2,400 metres (3,300–7,900 ft)	
	Dendrobium cruentum Rchb.f. 1884	Myanmar, Thailand and Vietnam	1,000 metres (3,300 ft)
	Dendrobium daklakense Tich, Schuit. & J.J.Verm.2010	Vietnam (Kontum, Dak Lak)	500–800 metres (1,600–2,600 ft)
	Dendrobium dearei Rchb.f. 1882	Borneo and the Philippines(Luzon, Dinagat, Mindanao)	60–100 metres (200–330 ft)
	Dendrobium deleonii Cabactulan, Cootes & R.B.Pimentel 2018	Philippines (Mindanao)	1,000–1,300 metres (3,300–4,300 ft)
	Dendrobium draconis Rchb.f. 1862	Cambodia (Kampong Speu, Kampong Thom, Steung Treng), Laos (Attopeu, Champasak, Savannakhet, Vientiane), Vietnam (Da Nang, Dak Lak, Khanh Hoa, Lam Dong). NE India, Myanmar, Thailand	200–1,000 metres (660–3,280 ft)
	Dendrobium erythropogon Rchb.f. 1885	Borneo	
	Dendrobium formosum Roxb. ex Lindl. 1830	India (Sikkim, Assam), Bangladesh, Nepal, Andaman Islands, Myanmar, Thailand and Vietnam	900–2,300 metres (3,000–7,500 ft)
	Dendrobium igneoniveum J.J.Sm. 1927	Sumatra	
	Dendrobium infundibulum Lindl. 1858	Laos (Xiangkhouang). Vietnam (Lam Dong), India, Myanmar, Thailand.	1,200–2,400 metres (3,900–7,900 ft)
	Dendrobium jerdonianum Wight1851	India and Sri Lanka	800–2,000 metres (2,600–6,600 ft)
	Dendrobium kontumense Gagnep. 1932	Laos (Borikhamxai, Khammouane, Vientiane), Vietnam (Dak Lak, Khanh Hoa, Kon Tum, Lam Dong, Thua Thien Hue), Thailand	200–1,700 metres (660–5,580 ft)
	Dendrobium lasioglossum Rchb.f. 1868	New Guinea	
	Dendrobium longicornu Lindl. 1828	Vietnam (Cao Bang, Dien Bien, Ha Giang, Lai Chau, Lao Cai, Nghe An, Son La, Tuyen Quang, Vinh Phuc). Bhutan, Nepal, India (Assam), Myanmar, China(Guangxi, Xizang, Yunnan)	1,000–2,100 metres (3,300–6,900 ft)
	Dendrobium lowii Lindl. 1861	Borneo (Sarawak)	600–1,000 metres (2,000–3,300 ft)
	Dendrobium lueckelianum Fessel & M.Wolff 1990	Thailand	1,200–1,300 metres (3,900–4,300 ft)
	Dendrobium luteolum Bateman 1864	Myanmar and Malaysia	
	Dendrobium multilineatum Kerr 1933	Laos (Kham Mouan and Xaisomboun)	1,300–1,900 metres (4,300–6,200 ft)
	Dendrobium ochraceum De Wild. 1906	Vietnam (Gia Lai, Ha Tinh, Quang Nam, Thu Thien-Hue)	200–800 metres (660–2,620 ft)
	Dendrobium ovipostoriferum J.J.Sm. 1912	Borneo	100–500 metres (330–1,640 ft)
	Dendrobium parthenium Rchb.f. 1885	Borneo (Sabah)	600–1,100 metres (2,000–3,600 ft)
	Dendrobium radians Rchb.f. 1868	Borneo (Sarawak)	1,200 metres (3,900 ft)
	Dendrobium roseiodorum Sathap., T.Yukawa & Seelanan 2010	Vietnam	1,000–1,200 metres (3,300–3,900 ft)
	Dendrobium sanderae Rolfe1909	Philippine (Luzon)	1,000–1,650 metres (3,280–5,410 ft)
	Dendrobium sarmentosum Rolfe1896	Myanmar	
	Dendrobium scabrilingue Lindl. 1858	Cambodia (Kampot), Laos (Vientiane), Myanmar, Thailand.	900–1,500 metres (3,000–4,900 ft)
	Dendrobium schuetzei Rolfe1911	Philippines(Mindanao)	300 metres (980 ft)
	Dendrobium sculptum Rchb.f. 1863	Borneo	1,200–1,500 metres (3,900–4,900 ft)
	Dendrobium senile Parish ex Rchb.f 1865]	Laos (Bolikhamxai, Champasak, Vientiane, Xiangkhoang). Vietnam (Dien Bien). Myanmar, Thailand.	900–1,200 metres (3,000–3,900 ft)
	Dendrobium singkawangense J.J.Sm. 1935	Borneo	300–400 metres (980–1,310 ft)
	Dendrobium sinsuronense J.J.Wood 2011	Borneo (Sabah)	900–1,500 metres (3,000–4,900 ft)
	Dendrobium spectatissimum Rchb.f. 1876	Borneo (Sabah )	1,500–1,800 metres (4,900–5,900 ft)
	Dendrobium sutepense Rolfe ex Downie 1925	Thailand and Myanmar	1,500–1,900 metres (4,900–6,200 ft)
	Dendrobium suzukii T.Yukawa 2002	Vietnam (Lai Chau, Lam Dong)	1,000–1,150 metres (3,280–3,770 ft)
	Dendrobium tobaense J.J.Wood & J.B.Comber1993	Sumatra	750–1,500 metres (2,460–4,920 ft)
	Dendrobium toppiorum A.L.Lamb & J.J.Wood 2008	Borneo (Sabah)	1,240 metres (4,070 ft)
	Dendrobium trankimianum T.Yukawa 2004	Vietnam (Khanh Hoa, Lam Dong)	800–2,000 metres (2,600–6,600 ft)
	Dendrobium trigonopus Rchb.f. 1887	Laos (Khammouan, Vientiane), Vietnam (Dien Bien, Lam Dong, Son La). Myanmar, China (Yunnan), Thailand	800–1,800 metres (2,600–5,900 ft)
	Dendrobium virgineum Rchb.f. 1884	Myanmar, Thailand, Laos, Cambodia and Vietnam	1,600 metres (5,200 ft)
	Dendrobium vogelsangii P.O'Byrne2000	Sulawesi	950–1,700 metres (3,120–5,580 ft)
	Dendrobium wattii (Hook.f.) Rchb.f.1888	Vietnam (Kon Tum, Lam Dong, Ninh Thuan), India, Myanmar, Thailand, China	900–2,400 metres (3,000–7,900 ft)
	Dendrobium williamsonii Day & Rchb.f.1869	Laos (Phongsali), Vietnam (Cao Bang, Da Nang, Dien Bien, Ha Giang, Lao Cai, Quang Binh, Quang Tri, Son La, Vinh Phuc). India (Assam), Myanmar, S. China	600–1,500 metres (2,000–4,900 ft)
	Dendrobium xanthophlebium Lindl. 1857	Myanmar and Thailand	1,350 metres (4,430 ft)
