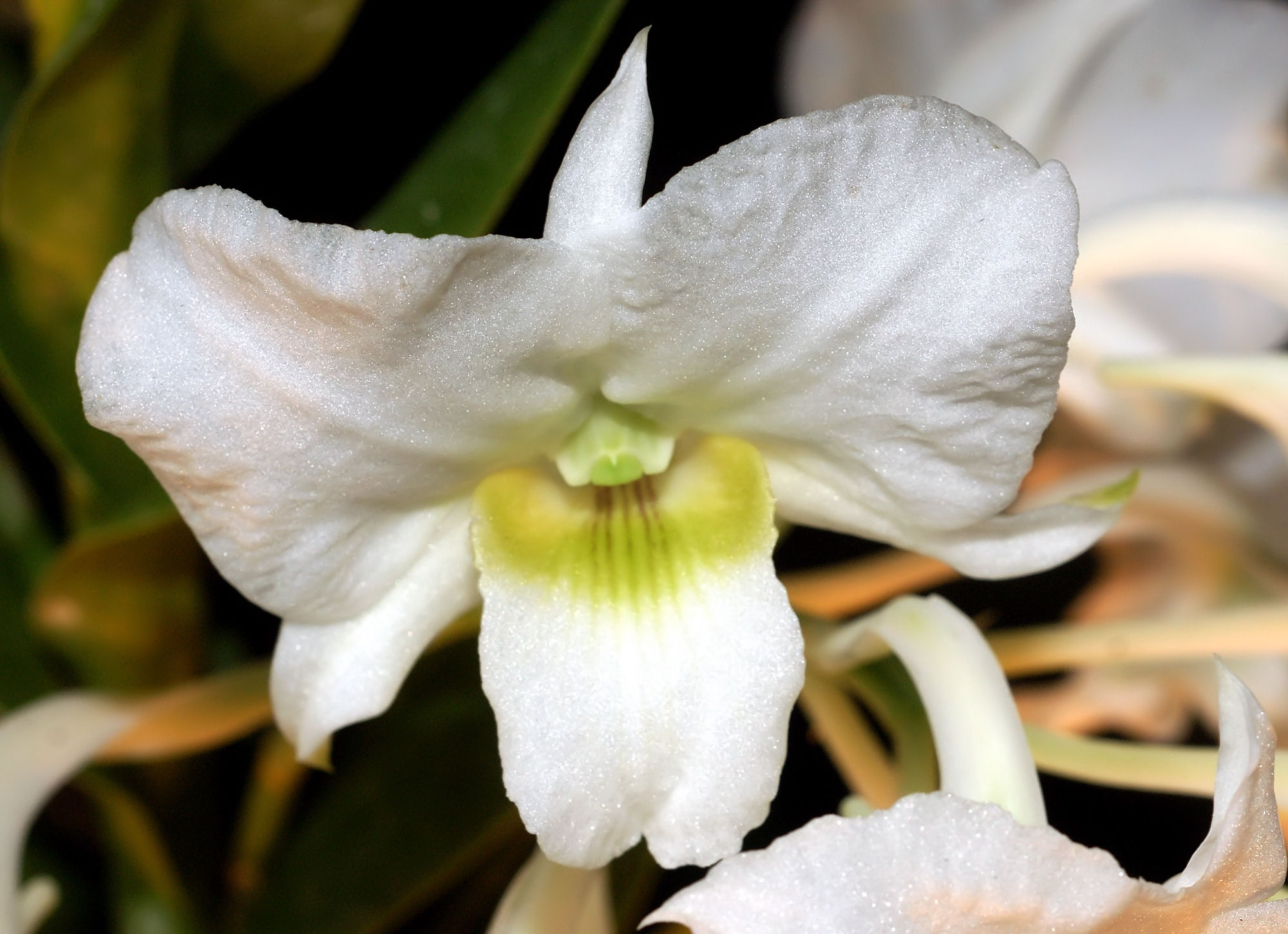
- Dendrobium dearei

Scientific classification
- Kingdom: Plantae
- Clade: Tracheophytes
- Clade: Angiosperms
- Clade: Monocots
- Order: Asparagales
- Family: Orchidaceae
- Subfamily: Epidendroideae
- Tribe: Dendrobieae; Lindl. ex Endl.

Genera
- Bulbophyllum; Dendrobium

= Dendrobieae =

Tribe of orchids

Dendrobieae is a tribe in the subfamily Epidendroideae, in the family Orchidaceae. The Dendrobieae are mostly tropical, epiphytic orchids which contain pseudobulbs.

The tribe contains two genera, Dendrobium and Bulbophyllum, which are both among the largest genera of orchids, and are common in cultivation. Previously, other genera were included in the tribe, which are now subsumed in Dendrobium and Bulbophyllum.

== Features ==
Dendrobieae are mostly small, epiphytic orchids. The roots are covered by velamen. There are usually pseudobulbs present, with leaves at the top; sometimes the species lacks pseudobulbs and the leaves are spread across the stem or the plant is leafless.

The flowers are terminal or axillary and spread across the stalk. The gynostemium is firm, with a clear foot. The anther is bent. The two or four pollinia are naked, they contain no viscidium, just like the Malaxideae.

== Distribution ==
Dendrobieae have a pantropical distribution.

== Taxonomy ==
=== Taxonomy according to Dressler, Cameron and van den Berg ===
The taxonomy of Dendrobieae is still under discussion. The group has been described with the composition below by Dressler (1993), but appears to be a polyphyletic group. This was investigated by Cameron et al. (1999) and van den Berg et al. (2000). However, they moved the genus Pseuderia to the tribe Podochileae. As a result, the tribe contained two subtribes, 27 genera and about 3,000 species.

Dendrobieae ' s phylogenetics can be seen below:

- Epidendroideae
  - Arethuseae, Epidendreae
  - - Podochileae
    - - - Malaxideae
        - - Dendrobieae
            - - Dendrobiinae
                - Epigeneium
              - Bulbophyllinae
                - Bulbophyllum
            - Dendrobiinae
              - Cadetia
              - - Dendrobium
                - - Flickingeria
                  - - Diplocaulobium
                    - Dendrobium
  - Calypsoeae, Epidendreae, Vandeae, Cymbidieae

- Subtribe: Bulbophyllinae
  - Genera:
    - Acrochaene - Bulbophyllum - Chaseella - Cirrhopetalum - Codonosiphon - Drymoda - Epicrianthes - Ferruminaria - Hapalochilus - Ione - Mastigion - Monomeria - Monosepalum - Osyricera - Pedilochilus - Rhytionanthos - Saccoglossum - Sunipia - Synarmosepalum - Tapeinoglossum - Trias - Vesicisepalum

=== Taxonomy according to Clements ===
In various studies in 2003 and 2006 based on DNA analysis, Clements called for a review of Dendrobieae to be placed in the more monophyletic groups. Thus Bulbophyllinae was positioned earlier while Podochileae in its original position.

He placed the genus Epigeneium in a separate monophyletic subtribe, Epigeneiinae, after Dendrobieae. The genus Dendrobium is split further: The species of the section Oxystophyllum were placed under Podochileae, the Australasian Dendrobium-species were split into a new set of genera in the Grastidiinae subtribe.

The Dendrobiinae subtribe then contained the genus Dendrobium which includes the Asiatic species of the former giant genus, totalling over 450 species, and several genera separated from it.

Based on his Dendrobium research, it was found that in the future, even more monophyletic groups could be identified in the future as separate genera.

The pedigree chart of Dendrobieae can be found below:

- Epidendroideae
  - Arethuseae, Epidendreae
  - - Podochileae (+Bulbophyllinae), Malaxideae
    - - Dendrobieae
        - Epigeneiinae
        - - Grastidiinae
          - Dendrobiinae
  - Calypsoeae, Epidendreae, Vandeae, Cymbidieae

- Subtribe: Dendrobiinae s.s.
  - Genera:
    - Anisopetala - Aporum - Callista - Ceraia - Coelandria - Dendrobium s.s. - Distichorchis - Eurycaulis - Pedilonum
- Subtribe: Epigeneiinae
  - Genera:
    - Epigeneium
- Subtribe: Grastidiinae
  - Genera:
    - Abaxianthus - Australorchis - Bouletia - Cadetia - Cannaeorchis - Cepobaculum - Ceratobium - Davejonesia - Dendrobates - Dichopus - Diplocaulobium - Dockrillia - Durabaculum - Eleutheroglossum - Eriopexis - Euphlebium - Exochanthus - Flickingeria - Grastidium - Herpetophytum - Inobulbum - Kinetochilus - Leioanthum - Microphytanthe - Monanthos - Sarcocadetia - Sayeria - Stilbophyllum - Tetrabaculum - Tetrodon - Thelychiton - Trachyrhizum - Tropilis - Vappodes - Winika

=== Taxonomy according to Chase ===
In their 2015 taxonomic review of Orchidaceae, Chase and colleagues relegated tribe Dendrobieae to a subtribe, Dendrobiinae, which they placed in tribe Malaxideae. The two genera, Bulbophyllum and Dendrobium were treated in a broad sense and the genera proposed by earlier authors synonymised.
