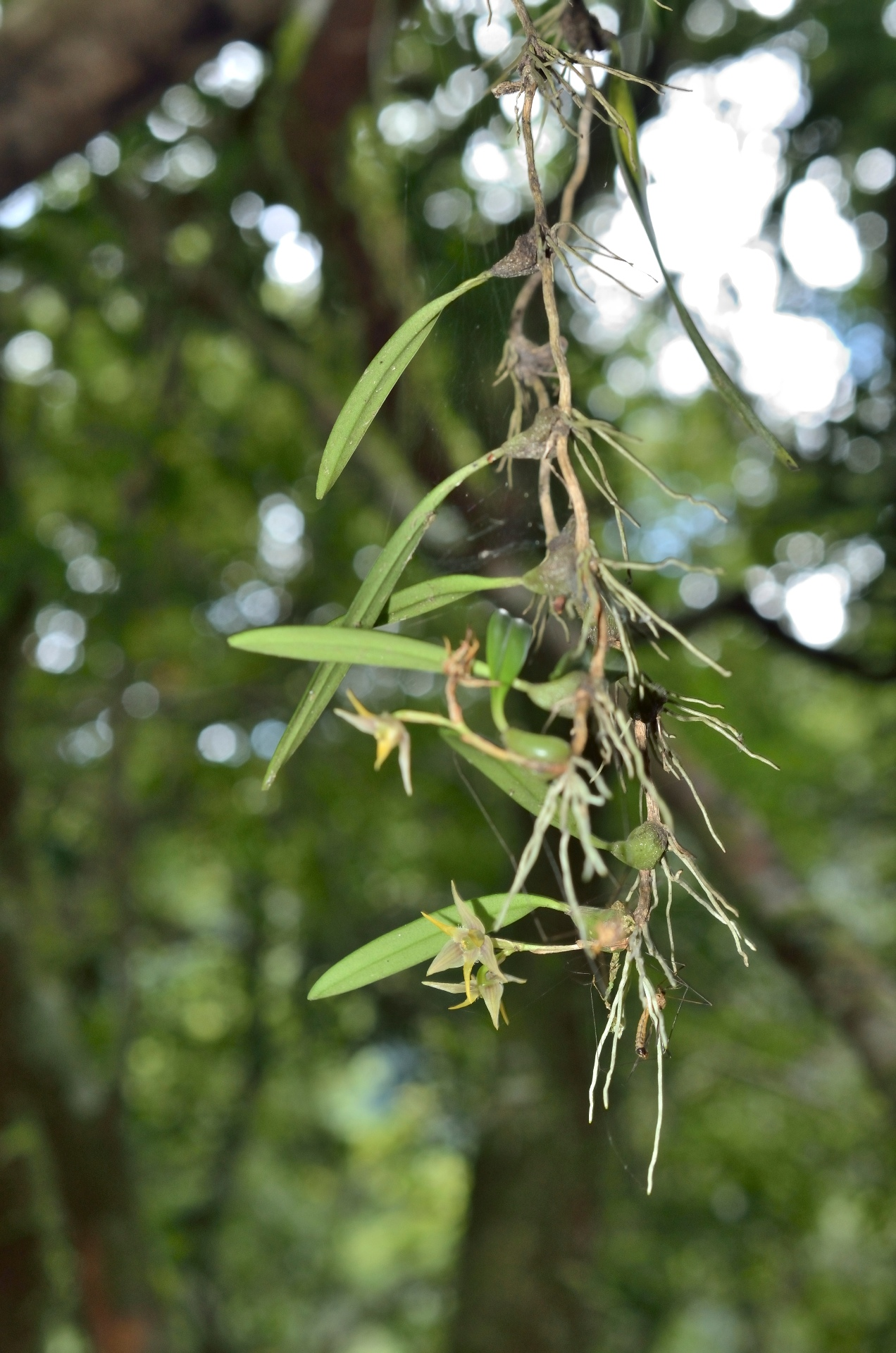
- Bulbophyllum sasakii

Scientific classification
- Kingdom: Plantae
- Clade: Tracheophytes
- Clade: Angiosperms
- Clade: Monocots
- Order: Asparagales
- Family: Orchidaceae
- Subfamily: Epidendroideae
- Genus: Bulbophyllum
- Section: Bulbophyllum sect. Ione (Lindley) J J Verm Schuit & de Vogel 2014

Type species
- Bulbophyllum roseopictum

Species
- See text

Synonyms
- Sunipia (Lindley) J J Verm, Pridgeon etal 2014; Ione Lindl. 1853

= Bulbophyllum sect. Ione =

Section of flowering plants

Bulbophyllum sect. Ione is a section of the genus Bulbophyllum.

== Description ==
Species in this section have one to many flowers with 4 to 8 bracts on the peduncle and 4 pollina equal in size.

== Distribution ==
Plants from this section are found from India, Nepal, Bhutan, China, Myanmar, Laos, Thailand, Vietnam and Taiwan in montane forests.

== Species ==
Bulbophyllum section Ione comprises the following species:

Image	Name	Distribution	Elevation (m)
	Bulbophyllum angustipetalum (Seidenf.) J.J.Verm., Schuit. & de Vogel 2014	China (Yunnan) and Thailand	
	Bulbophyllum arunachalense (A.N.Rao) J.J.Verm., Schuit. & de Vogel 2014	Arunachal Pradesh	
	Bulbophyllum australe (Seidenf.) J.J.Verm., Schuit. & de Vogel 2014	Thailand	1,000–1,200 metres (3,300–3,900 ft)
	Bulbophyllum bifurcatoflorens (Fukuy.) J.J.Verm., Schuit. & de Vogel 2014	Himalayas, Assam, Taiwan, Myanmar, Thailand and Vietnam	700–1,700 metres (2,300–5,600 ft)
	Bulbophyllum candidum Hook.f. 1890	China (southern Xizang and northwestern to southern Yunnan), Bhutan and northeastern India	1,900–2,900 metres (6,200–9,500 ft)
	Bulbophyllum cirrhatum (Lindl.) Hook.f. 1890	Nepal to China (Yunnan) and N. Myanmar.	
	Bulbophyllum cumberlegei (Seidenf.) J.J.Verm., Schuit. & de Vogel 2014	Thailand	1,400 metres (4,600 ft)
	Bulbophyllum interpositum J.J.Verm., Schuit. & de Vogel 2015	China(Xizang) and Sikkim	1,800 metres (5,900 ft)
	Bulbophyllum jainii (Hynn. & Malhotra) J.J.Verm., Schuit. & de Vogel 2014	Arunachal Pradesh to Assam	
	Bulbophyllum kachinense (Seidenf.) J.J.Verm., Schuit. & de Vogel 2014	Myanmar	
	Bulbophyllum kipgenii (Kishor, Chowlu & Vij) J.J.Verm., Schuit. & de Vogel 2014	India (Assam)	
	Bulbophyllum lomsakense J.J.Verm., Schuit. & de Vogel 2014	China(Yunnan) and Thailand	1,400–1,700 metres (4,600–5,600 ft)
	Bulbophyllum lopalanthum J.J.Verm., Schuit. & de Vogel 2014	Thailand, Myanmar and Laos	1,100 metres (3,600 ft)
	Bulbophyllum medioximum J.J.Verm., Schuit. & de Vogel 2014	China (Yunnan) and northern Thailand and Vietnam	1,700–2,400 metres (5,600–7,900 ft)
	Bulbophyllum minutius J.J.Verm., Schuit. & de Vogel 2014	Thailand	1,300 metres (4,300 ft)
	Bulbophyllum nigricans (Aver.) J.J.Verm., Schuit. & de Vogel 2014	China(Yunnan) and Vietnam	1,200–1,800 metres (3,900–5,900 ft)
	Bulbophyllum pallidulum J.J.Verm., Schuit. & de Vogel 2014	Vietnam	
	Bulbophyllum pulcherissimum H. Jiang, D.M. He & J.D. Ya 2021	China(Yunnan)	1,750–2,050 metres (5,740–6,730 ft)
	Bulbophyllum purpureofuscum J.J.Verm., Schuit. & de Vogel 2014	Himalayas, Assam, Nepal and Myanamar	1,600–2,000 metres (5,200–6,600 ft)
	Bulbophyllum raskotii J.J.Verm., Schuit. & de Vogel 2014	Nepal, Bhutan	2,400 metres (7,900 ft)
	Bulbophyllum rimannii (Rchb.f.) J.J.Verm., Schuit. & de Vogel 2014	Sikkim, Bhutan, Assam, Myanmar, Thailand and China (Yunnan)	1,500–1,750 metres (4,920–5,740 ft)
	Bulbophyllum roseopictum J.J.Verm., Schuit. & de Vogel 2014	Sikkim, Nepal, Bhutan, Myanmar, Thailand and China(Yunnan)	900–2,700 metres (3,000–8,900 ft)
	Bulbophyllum rutiliflorum J.J.Verm., Schuit. & de Vogel 2014	Thailand	
	Bulbophyllum sasakii (Hayata) J.J.Verm., Schuit. & de Vogel 2014	Taiwan	
	Bulbophyllum soidaoense (Seidenf.) J.J.Verm., Schuit. & de Vogel 2014	China(Yunnan) and Thailand	1,900–2,000 metres (6,200–6,600 ft)
	Bulbophyllum sunipia J.J.Verm., Schuit. & de Vogel 2014	Nepal, northeastern India, Myanmar, Thailand, Vietnam and China( Yunnan)	900–2,300 metres (3,000–7,500 ft)
	Bulbophyllum tixieri Seidenf. 1992	Thailand and Vietnam	900–1,400 metres (3,000–4,600 ft)
	Bulbophyllum tsii J.J.Verm., Schuit. & de Vogel 2014	China (Hainan)	
	Bulbophyllum virens (Lindl.) Hook.f. 1890	Arunachal Pradesh	
	Bulbophyllum xanthochloron J.J.Verm., Schuit. & de Vogel 2014	Thailand	1,250–1,400 metres (4,100–4,590 ft)
