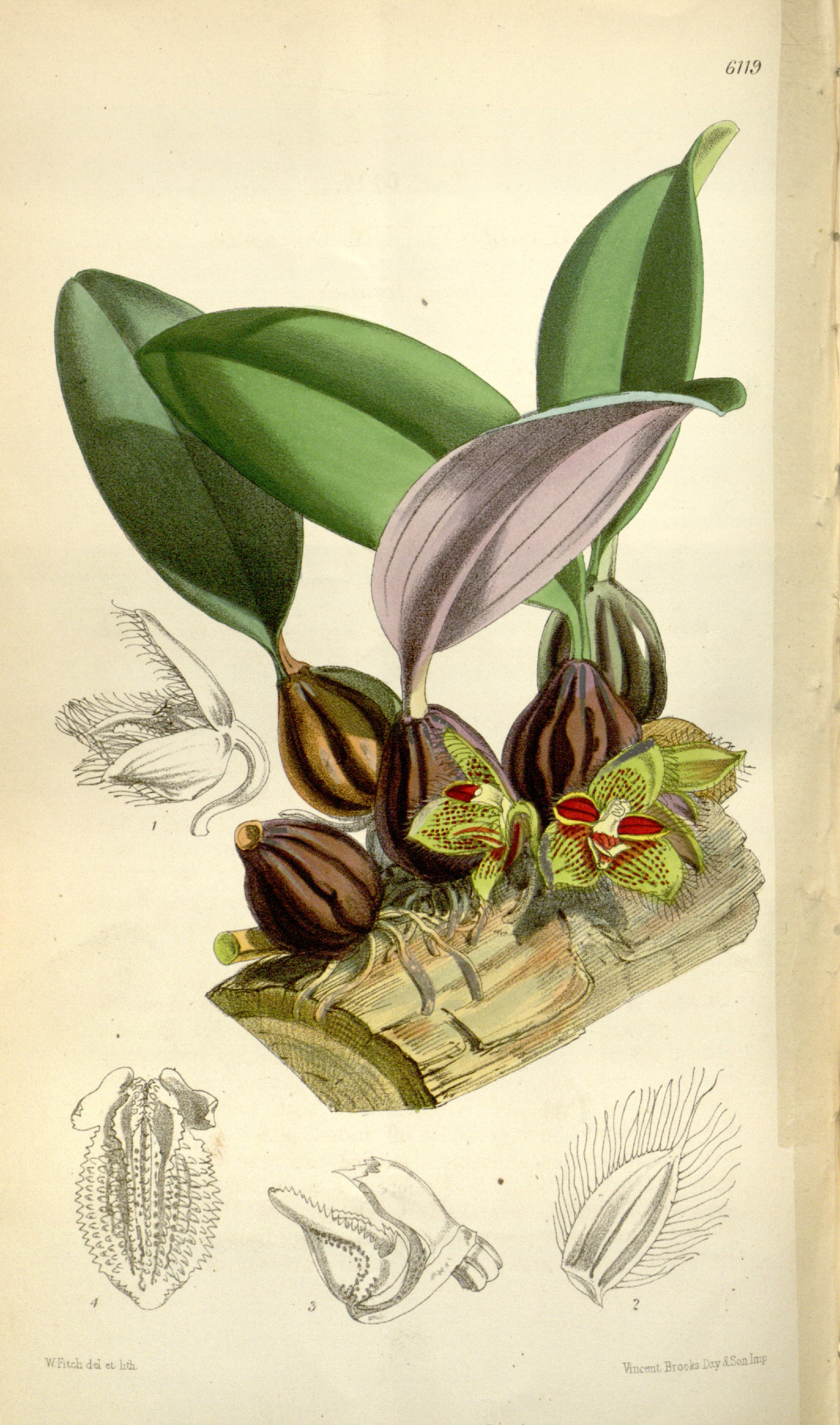
- Bulbophyllum dayanum from Curtis Botanical Magazine

Scientific classification
- Kingdom: Plantae
- Clade: Tracheophytes
- Clade: Angiosperms
- Clade: Monocots
- Order: Asparagales
- Family: Orchidaceae
- Subfamily: Epidendroideae
- Genus: Bulbophyllum
- Section: Bulbophyllum sect. Acrochaene (Lindl.) J.J. Verm., Schuit. & de Vogel 2014

Type species
- Bulbophyllum kingii

Species
- See text

Synonyms
- Acrochaene Lindley 1853

= Bulbophyllum sect. Acrochaene =

Section of flowering plants

Bulbophyllum sect. Acrochaene is a section of the genus Bulbophyllum.

== Description ==
Species in this section are creeping rhizomatous epiphytes with a single flower with 3 vein petals and 4 pollinas

== Distribution ==
Plants from this section are found from India to Vietnam and South to Thailand.

== Species ==
Bulbophyllum section Acrochaene comprises the following species:

Image	Name	Distribution	Elevation (m)
	Bulbophyllum dayanum Rchb. f. 1865	India, Myanmar, Cambodia, Vietnam and Thailand	700–1,300 metres (2,300–4,300 ft)
	Bulbophyllum kingii Hook.f. 1890	Assam, the eastern Himalayas, Myanmar and Thailand	1,300–2,200 metres (4,300–7,200 ft)
	Bulbophyllum sigaldiae Guillaumin 1955	Vietnam and Thailand	900–1,500 metres (3,000–4,900 ft)
