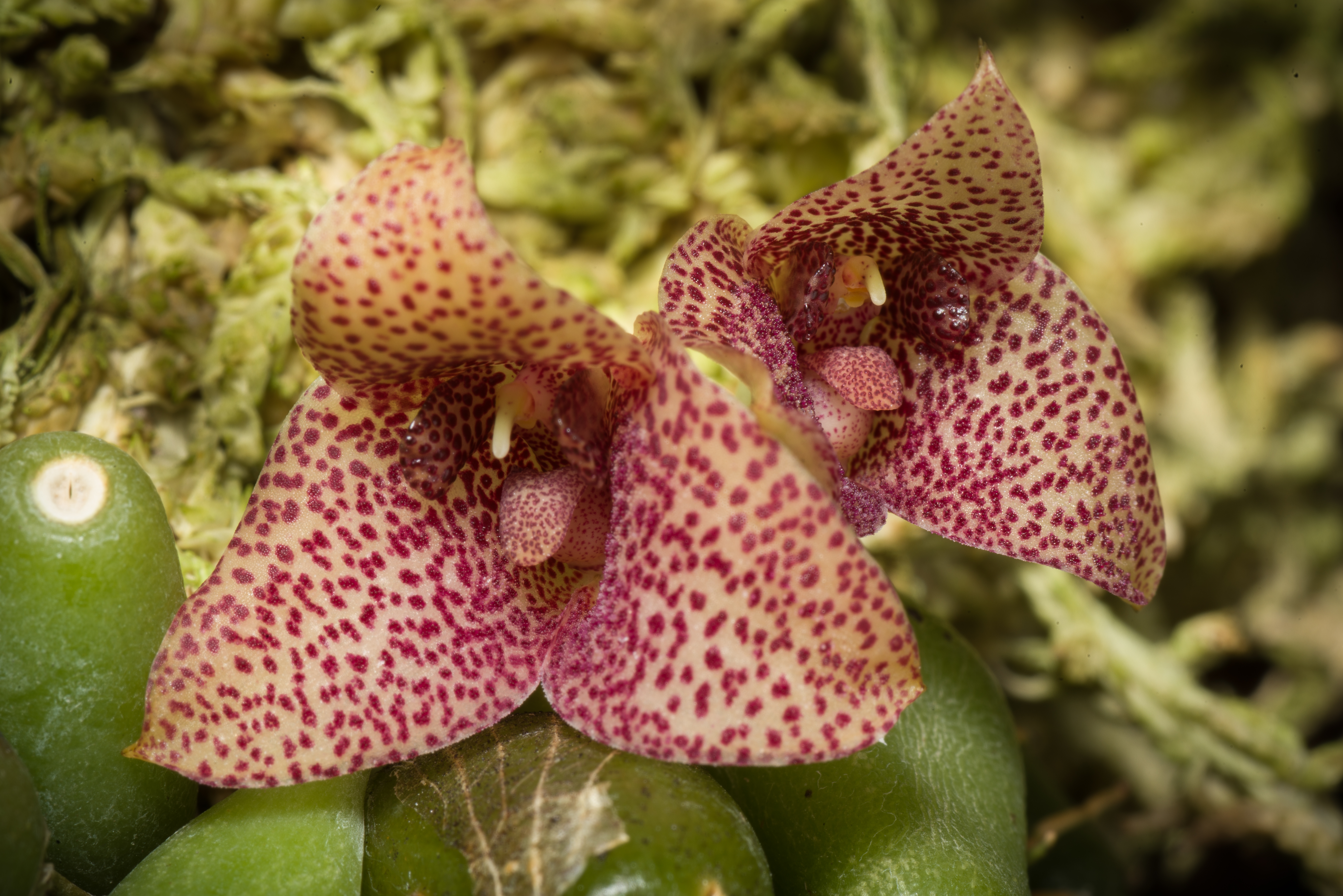
- Bulbophyllum pictum

Scientific classification
- Kingdom: Plantae
- Clade: Tracheophytes
- Clade: Angiosperms
- Clade: Monocots
- Order: Asparagales
- Family: Orchidaceae
- Subfamily: Epidendroideae
- Genus: Bulbophyllum
- Section: Bulbophyllum sect. Trias [Lindl.] J J Verm, Schuit & de Vogel 2014

Type species
- Bulbophyllum oblongum Rchb.f 1864

Species
- See text

Synonyms
- Trias Lindl.

= Bulbophyllum sect. Trias =

Section of flowering plants

Bulbophyllum sect. Trias is a section of the genus Bulbophyllum.

== Description ==
Species in this section are rhizomatous with a single flower arising below the pseudobulb.

== Distribution ==
Plants from this section are found in the Indian subcontinent, Indochina, Borneo and the Andaman & Nicobar Islands.

== Species ==
Bulbophyllum section Trias comprises the following species:

| Image | Name | Distribution | Elevation (m) |
|---|---|---|---|
| | Bulbophyllum antheae (J.J.Verm. & A.L.Lamb) J.J.Verm., Schuit. & de Vogel 2014 | Borneo (Sabah) | 400 metres (1,300 ft) |
| | Bulbophyllum bonaccordense (C.S.Kumar) J.J.Verm., Schuit. & de Vogel 2014 | southwestern India | |
| | Bulbophyllum cambodianum (Christenson) J.J.Verm., Schuit. & de Vogel 2014 | Cambodia, Vietnam | |
| | Bulbophyllum capnophyton J.J.Verm., Schuit. & de Vogel 2014 | Thailand | |
| | Bulbophyllum crassifolium Thwaites ex Trimen 1885 | Sri Lanka | 200–500 metres (660–1,640 ft) |
| | Bulbophyllum disciflorum Rolfe 1895 | eastern Himalayas, Laos and Vietnam | 1,500 metres (4,900 ft) |
| | Bulbophyllum leion J.J.Verm., Schuit. & de Vogel 2014 | Thailand | 1,400–1,500 metres (4,600–4,900 ft) |
| | Bulbophyllum manabendrae D.K.Roy, Barbhuiya & Talukdar 2014 | India (Meghalaya) | 182 metres (597 ft) |
| | Bulbophyllum meson J.J.Verm., Schuit. & de Vogel 2014 | Thailand | |
| | Bulbophyllum nasutum Rchb. f. 1871 | eastern Himalayas, Myanmar, Thailand and Vietnam | 1,500 metres (4,900 ft) |
| | Bulbophyllum oblongum Rchb.f 1864 | Assam, India, Bangladesh, Myanmar and Thailand | |
| | Bulbophyllum pictum Parrish & Rchb.f 1913 | Myanmar and Thailand | 1,000 metres (3,300 ft) |
| | Bulbophyllum jejosephii J.J.Verm., Schuit. & de Vogel 2014 | Assam India | |
| | Bulbophyllum roseum Ridley 1896 | Bangladesh, Myanmar and Thailand | |
| | Bulbophyllum stocksii (Benth. ex Hook.f.) J.J.Verm., Schuit. & de Vogel 2014 | southern India | |
