= Bulbophyllum sect. Tapeinoglossum =

Scientific classification
- Kingdom: Plantae
- Clade: Tracheophytes
- Clade: Angiosperms
- Clade: Monocots
- Order: Asparagales
- Family: Orchidaceae
- Subfamily: Epidendroideae
- Genus: Bulbophyllum
- Section: Bulbophyllum sect. Tapeinoglossum; J.J. Sm. 1916

Type species
- Bulbophyllum centrosemiflorum

Species
- See text

Synonyms
- Tapeinoglossum Schltr. 1913

Section of flowering plants

Bulbophyllum sect. Tapeinoglossum is a section of the genus Bulbophyllum.

== Description ==
Species in this section have median sepal fused to the laterals proximally.

== Distribution ==
Plants from this section are found in New Guinea.

== Species ==
Bulbophyllum section Tapeinoglossum comprises the following species:

Image	Name	Distribution	Elevation (m)
	Bulbophyllum centrosemiflorum J.J. Sm.1912	New Guinea	600–800 metres (2,000–2,600 ft)
	Bulbophyllum nannodes Schltr. 1905	New Guinea	450 metres (1,480 ft)
