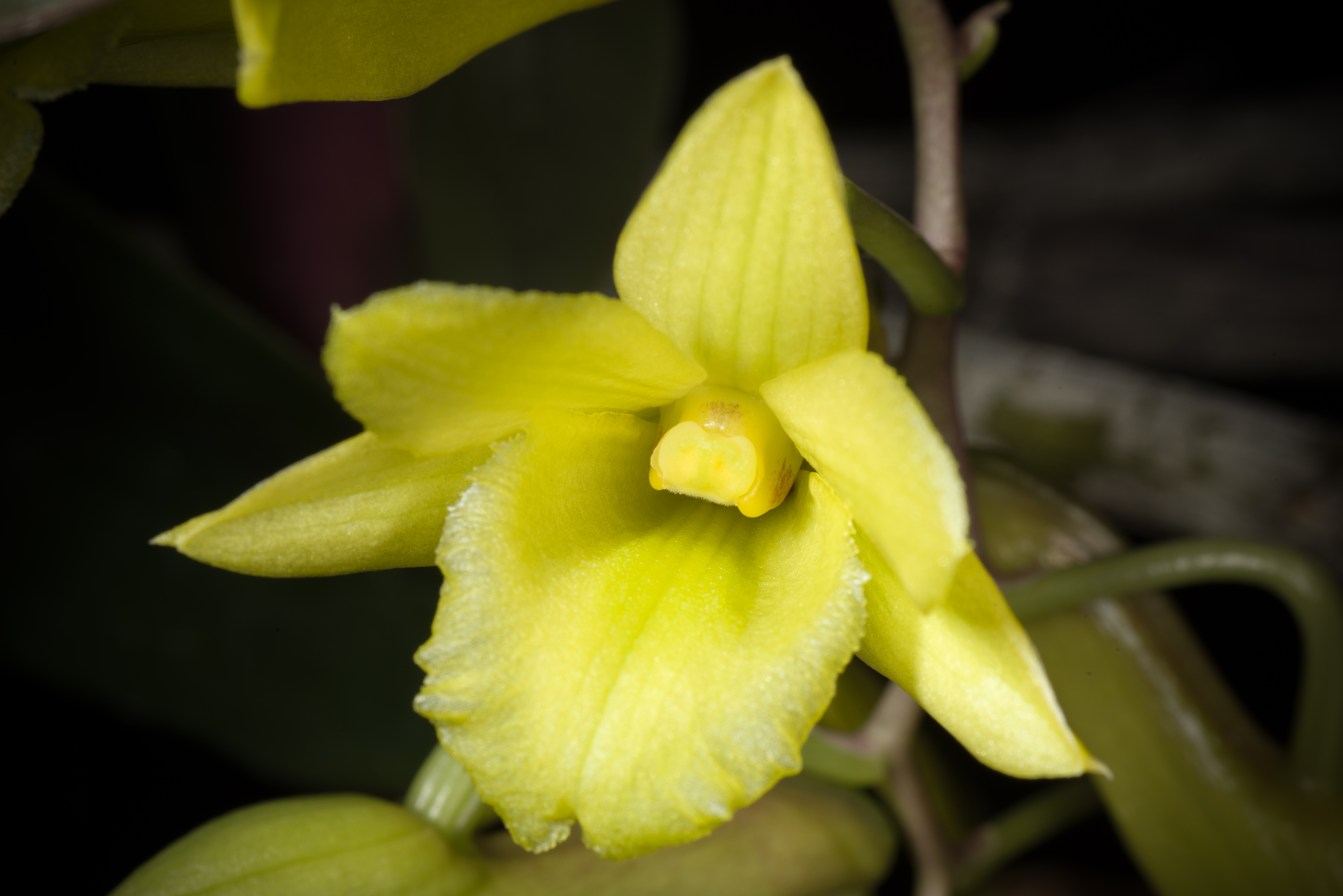

Scientific classification
- Kingdom: Plantae
- Clade: Tracheophytes
- Clade: Angiosperms
- Clade: Monocots
- Order: Asparagales
- Family: Orchidaceae
- Subfamily: Epidendroideae
- Tribe: Malaxideae
- Subtribe: Dendrobiinae
- Genus: Dendrobium
- Species: D. cerinum

Binomial name
- Dendrobium cerinum Rchb.f.

Synonyms
- Eurycaulis cerinus (Rchb.f.) M.A.Clem.

= Dendrobium cerinum =

Species of orchid

Dendrobium cerinum is a species of orchid that is endemic to the island of Luzon in the Philippines. It was first formally described in 1879 by Heinrich Gustav Reichenbach in The Gardeners' Chronicle. The specific epithet cerinum is derived from the Ancient Greek word kerinos meaning "waxen", "wax-colored" or "yellowish".
