= Bulbophyllum kingii =

Scientific classification
- Kingdom: Plantae
- Clade: Tracheophytes
- Clade: Angiosperms
- Clade: Monocots
- Order: Asparagales
- Family: Orchidaceae
- Subfamily: Epidendroideae
- Tribe: Malaxideae
- Subtribe: Dendrobiinae
- Genus: Bulbophyllum
- Species: B. kingii

Binomial name
- Bulbophyllum kingii Hook.f.

Synonyms
- Acrochaene punctata Lindl.

Species of orchid

Bulbophyllum kingii is a species of orchid. It is native to Sikkim, Laos, Myanmar Thailand, and Eastern Himalaya.
