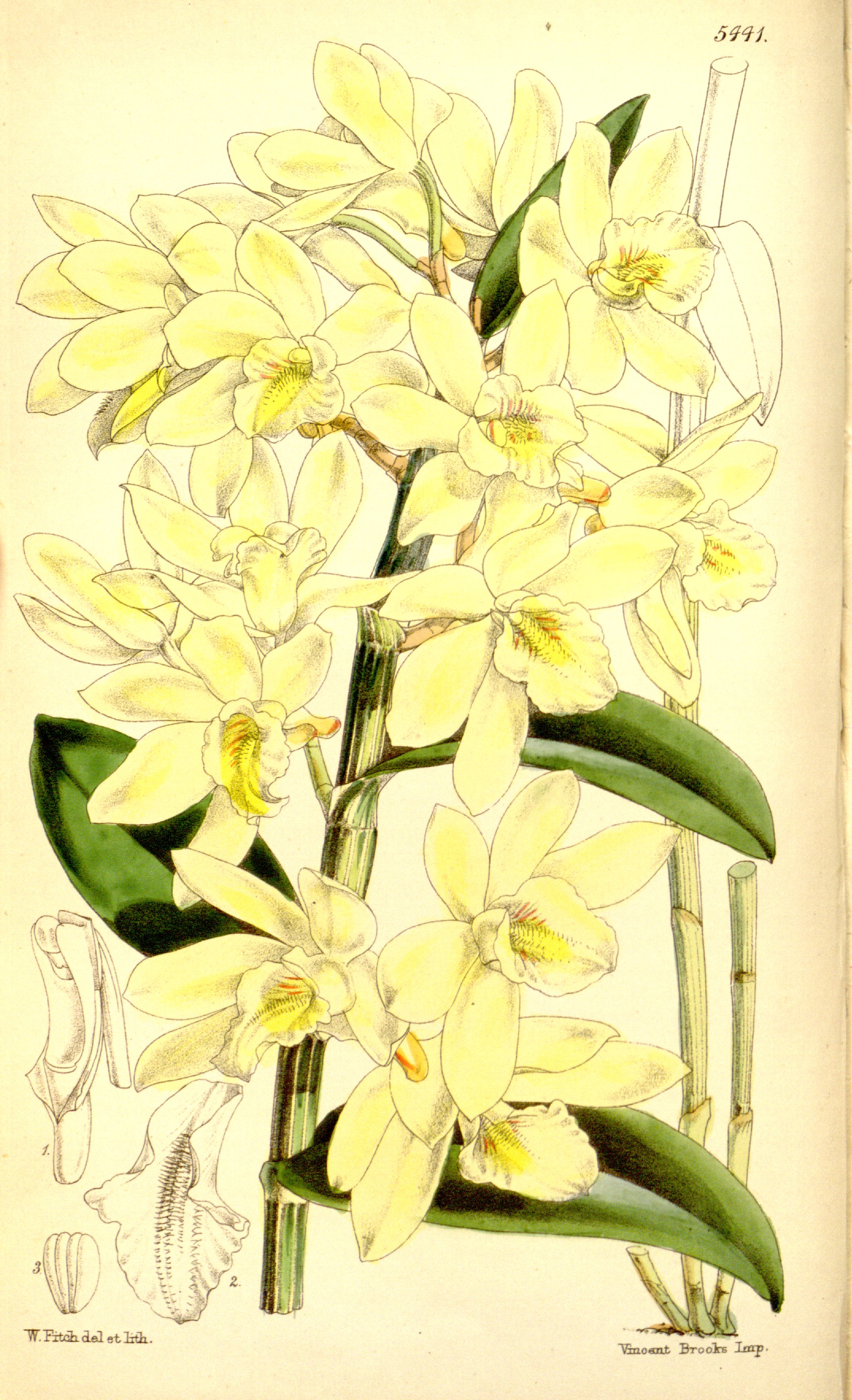

Scientific classification
- Kingdom: Plantae
- Clade: Tracheophytes
- Clade: Angiosperms
- Clade: Monocots
- Order: Asparagales
- Family: Orchidaceae
- Subfamily: Epidendroideae
- Genus: Dendrobium
- Species: D. luteolum

Binomial name
- Dendrobium luteolum Bateman ex Rchb.f.

Synonyms
- Callista luteola (Bateman ex Rchb.f.) Kuntze

= Dendrobium luteolum =

Species of orchid

Dendrobium luteolum is a species of epiphytic orchid in the subtribe Dendrobiinae.

It is native to Peninsular Malaysia and Myanmar in Southeast Asia. It grows along streams at low elevations.

The fragrant flowers are white and yellow.
