= Bulbophyllum sect. Pedilochilus =

Scientific classification
- Kingdom: Plantae
- Clade: Tracheophytes
- Clade: Angiosperms
- Clade: Monocots
- Order: Asparagales
- Family: Orchidaceae
- Subfamily: Epidendroideae
- Genus: Bulbophyllum
- Section: Bulbophyllum sect. Pedilochilus [Schlechter] J J Verm & O'Byrne 2011

Type species
- Bulbophyllum papuanum

Species
- See text

Section of flowering plants

Bulbophyllum sect. Pedilochilus is a section of the genus Bulbophyllum.

== Description ==
Species in this section have creeping rhizomes with a single flower.

== Distribution ==
Plants from this section are found in New Guinea.

== Species ==
Bulbophyllum section Pedilochilus comprises the following species:

Image	Name	Distribution	Elevation (m)
	Bulbophyllum alpinum (P.Royen) J.J.Verm., Schuit. & de Vogel 2014	New Guinea	2,660–3,560 metres (8,730–11,680 ft)
	Bulbophyllum araiophyllum J.J.Verm., Schuit. & de Vogel 2014	New Guinea	1,300–1,800 metres (4,300–5,900 ft)
	Bulbophyllum balgooiji J.J.Verm., Schuit. & de Vogel 2014	Papua New Guinea	
	Bulbophyllum bantaengense (J.J.Sm.) J.J.Verm. & P.O'Byrne 2011	southern Sulawesi	2,400–2,900 metres (7,900–9,500 ft)
	Bulbophyllum brachiatum (Schltr.) J.J.Verm., Schuit. & de Vogel 2014	New Guinea	
	Bulbophyllum brachypus (Schltr.) J.J.Verm., Schuit. & de Vogel 2014	New Guinea	2,400 metres (7,900 ft)
	Bulbophyllum clemensiorum J.J.Verm., Schuit. & de Vogel 2014	New Guinea	1,700 metres (5,600 ft)
	Bulbophyllum coiloglossum Schltr. 1905	New Guinea	600–1,100 metres (2,000–3,600 ft)
	Bulbophyllum cyatheicola (P.Royen) J.J.Verm., Schuit. & de Vogel 2014	Papua New Guinea	3,050–3,500 metres (10,010–11,480 ft)
	Bulbophyllum dolichopus J.J.Verm., Schuit. & de Vogel 2014	New Guinea and the Bismark archipelago	1,300 metres (4,300 ft)
	Bulbophyllum erythrokyle J.J.Verm., Schuit. & de Vogel 2014	New Guinea	1,800 metres (5,900 ft)
	Bulbophyllum hermonii (P.J.Cribb & B.A.Lewis) J.J.Verm., Schuit. & de Vogel 2015	Vanuatu	700–1,800 metres (2,300–5,900 ft)
	Bulbophyllum kermesinostriatum (J.J.Sm.) J.J.Verm., Schuit. & de Vogel 2014	New Guinea	
	Bulbophyllum lagaropetalum J.J.Verm., Schuit. & de Vogel 2014	New Guinea	1,300 metres (4,300 ft)
	Bulbophyllum lagarophyllum J.J.Verm., Schuit. & de Vogel 2014	New Guinea	1,300 metres (4,300 ft)
	Bulbophyllum leptotriche J.J.Verm., Schuit. & de Vogel 2014	New Guinea	1,200 metres (3,900 ft)
	Bulbophyllum macrorrhinum (P.Royen) J.J.Verm., Schuit. & de Vogel 2014	western New Guinea	3,650 metres (11,980 ft)
	Bulbophyllum montisdischorense J.J.Verm., Schuit. & de Vogel 2014	New Guinea	1,200 metres (3,900 ft)
	Bulbophyllum obovatum (J.J.Sm.) J.J.Verm., Schuit. & de Vogel 2014	New Guinea	3,200–3,250 metres (10,500–10,660 ft)
	Bulbophyllum oreomene J.J.Verm., Schuit. & de Vogel 2014	New Guinea	759–3,794 metres (2,490–12,448 ft)
	Bulbophyllum papuanum (Schltr.) J.J.Verm., Schuit. & de Vogel 2014	Papua New Guinea	1,600–2,600 metres (5,200–8,500 ft)
	Bulbophyllum pedilochilus J.J.Verm., Schuit. & de Vogel 2014	New Guinea	1,000 metres (3,300 ft)
	Bulbophyllum petioliferum J.J.Verm., Schuit. & de Vogel 2014	New Guinea	2,000 metres (6,600 ft)
	Bulbophyllum petrophilum (P.Royen) J.J.Verm., Schuit. & de Vogel 2014	Papua New Guinea	3,170–3,250 metres (10,400–10,660 ft)
	Bulbophyllum piundaundense (P.Royen) J.J.Verm., Schuit. & de Vogel 2014	Papua New Guinea	3,480–3,930 metres (11,420–12,890 ft)
	Bulbophyllum psychrophilum (F.Muell.) J.J.Verm., Schuit. & de Vogel 2014	New Guinea	
	Bulbophyllum sarawaketense (P.Royen) J.J.Verm., Schuit. & de Vogel 2014	New Guinea	3,500–3,800 metres (11,500–12,500 ft)
	Bulbophyllum spaniostagon J.J.Verm., Schuit. & de Vogel 2014	New Guinea	2,500 metres (8,200 ft)
	Bulbophyllum tapeinophyton J.J.Verm. 2014	Papua New Guinea	1,420 metres (4,660 ft)
	Bulbophyllum teinophyllum J.J.Verm., Schuit. & de Vogel 2014	Papua New Guinea	3,000 metres (9,800 ft)
	Bulbophyllum terrestre (J.J.Sm.) J.J.Verm., Schuit. & de Vogel 2014	New Guinea	3,200 metres (10,500 ft)
	Bulbophyllum theiochroma J.J.Verm., Schuit. & de Vogel 2014	Papua New Guinea	2,400 metres (7,900 ft)
	Bulbophyllum vanroyenii J.J.Verm., Schuit. & de Vogel 2014	western New Guinea	3,420 metres (11,220 ft)
	Bulbophyllum zophyranthum J.J.Verm., Schuit. & de Vogel 2014	New Guinea	2,300 metres (7,500 ft)
