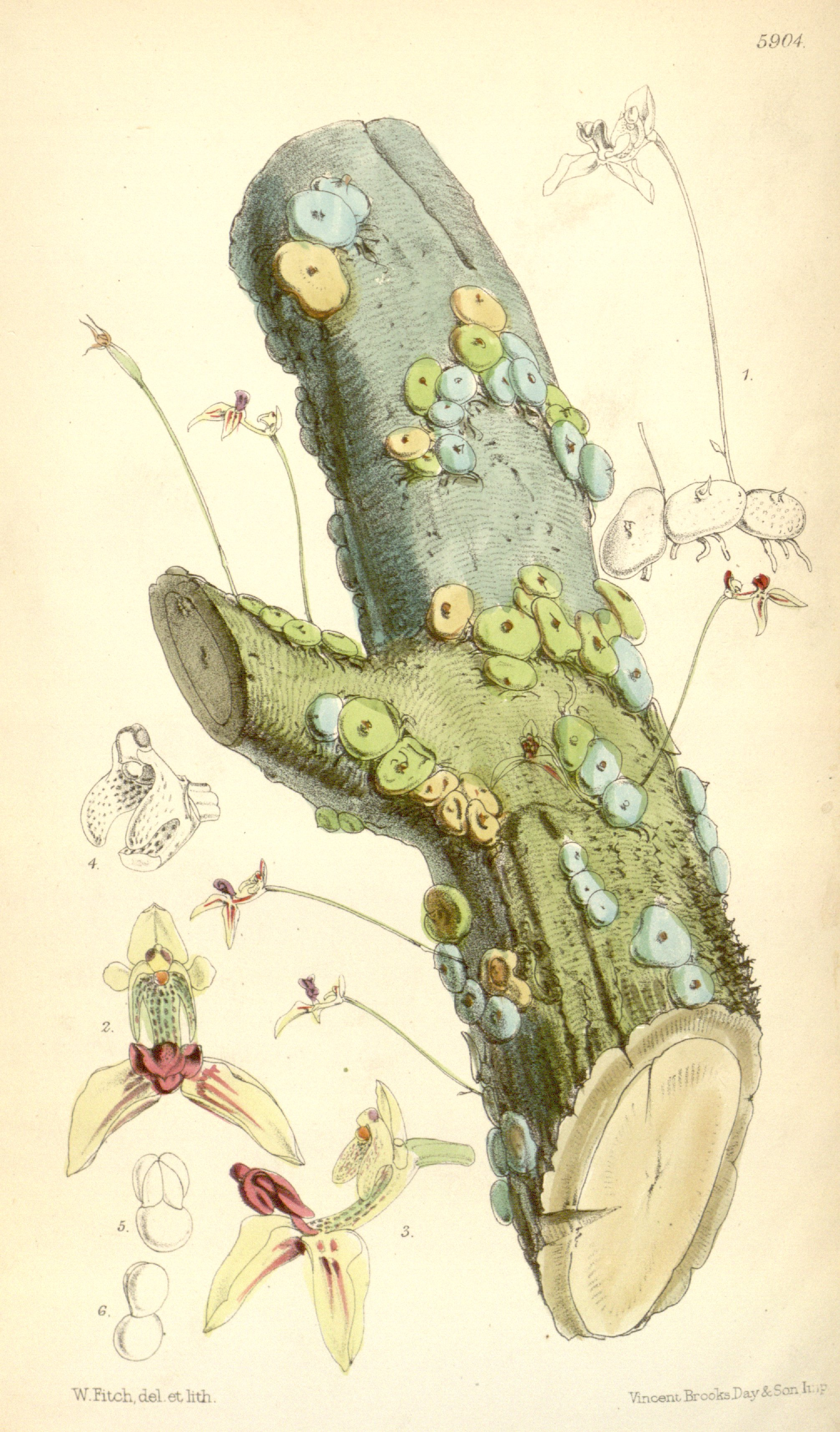
- Bulbophyllum biflorum

Scientific classification
- Kingdom: Plantae
- Clade: Tracheophytes
- Clade: Angiosperms
- Clade: Monocots
- Order: Asparagales
- Family: Orchidaceae
- Subfamily: Epidendroideae
- Genus: Bulbophyllum
- Section: Bulbophyllum sect. Drymoda (Lindl.) J.J.Verm., Schuit. & de Vogel

Type species
- Bulbophyllum drymoda

Species
- See text

Synonyms
- Drymoda Lindl.

= Bulbophyllum sect. Drymoda =

Section of flowering plants

Bulbophyllum sect. Drymoda is a section of the genus Bulbophyllum.

== Description ==
Species in this section is distinguished by very long columns and four pollina.

== Distribution ==
Plants from this section are found in Myanmar, Thailand and Laos.

== Species ==
Bulbophyllum section Drymoda comprises the following species:

Image	Name	Distribution	Elevation (m)
	Bulbophyllum ayuthayense J.J.Verm., Schuit. & de Vogel 2014	China(Yunnan), Thailand and Laos	200–1,100 metres (660–3,610 ft)
	Bulbophyllum drymoda J.J.Verm., Schuit. & de Vogel 2014	Myanmar and Thailand	1,300–1,550 metres (4,270–5,090 ft)
