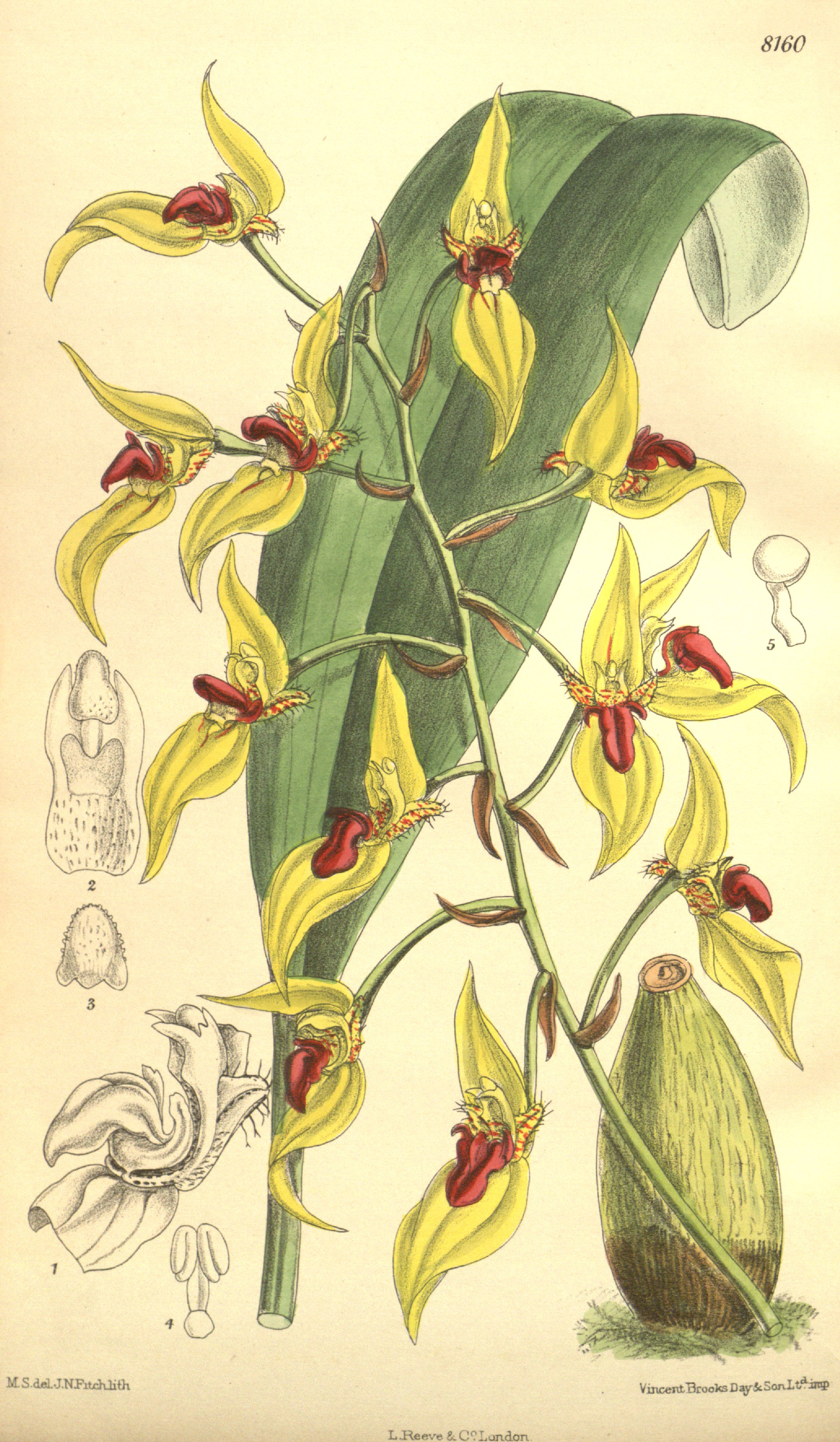
- Bulbophyllum dichromum from Curtis Botanical Magazine

Scientific classification
- Kingdom: Plantae
- Clade: Tracheophytes
- Clade: Angiosperms
- Clade: Monocots
- Order: Asparagales
- Family: Orchidaceae
- Subfamily: Epidendroideae
- Genus: Bulbophyllum
- Section: Bulbophyllum sect. Monomeria (Lindl.) J.J. Verm., Schuit. & de Vogel, 2014

Type species
- Bulbophyllum crabro

Species
- See text.

Synonyms
- Bulbophyllum sect. Henosis [Hkr.] Ormerod 2001

= Bulbophyllum sect. Monomeria =

Section of flowering plants

Bulbophyllum sect. Monomeria is a section of the genus Bulbophyllum.

== Distribution ==
Plants from this section are found in the Indian subcontinent and Southeast Asia.

== Species ==
Bulbophyllum section Monomeria comprises the following species:

Image	Name	Distribution	Elevation (m)
	Bulbophyllum crabro (E.C.Parish & Rchb.f.) J.J.Verm., Schuit. & de Vogel 2014	India (Assam), China (Yunnan and Xizang), Nepal, Myanmar, Thailand, Malaysia and Vietnam	600–2,200 metres (2,000–7,200 ft)
	Bulbophyllum dichromum Rolfe 1907	Vietnam and Laos	1,900–2,100 metres (6,200–6,900 ft)
	Bulbophyllum fengianum (Ormerod) J.J.Verm. 2014	China (Yunnan)	
	Bulbophyllum longipes Rchb.f. 1861	Myanmar and Thailand	1,200–1,500 metres (3,900–4,900 ft)
