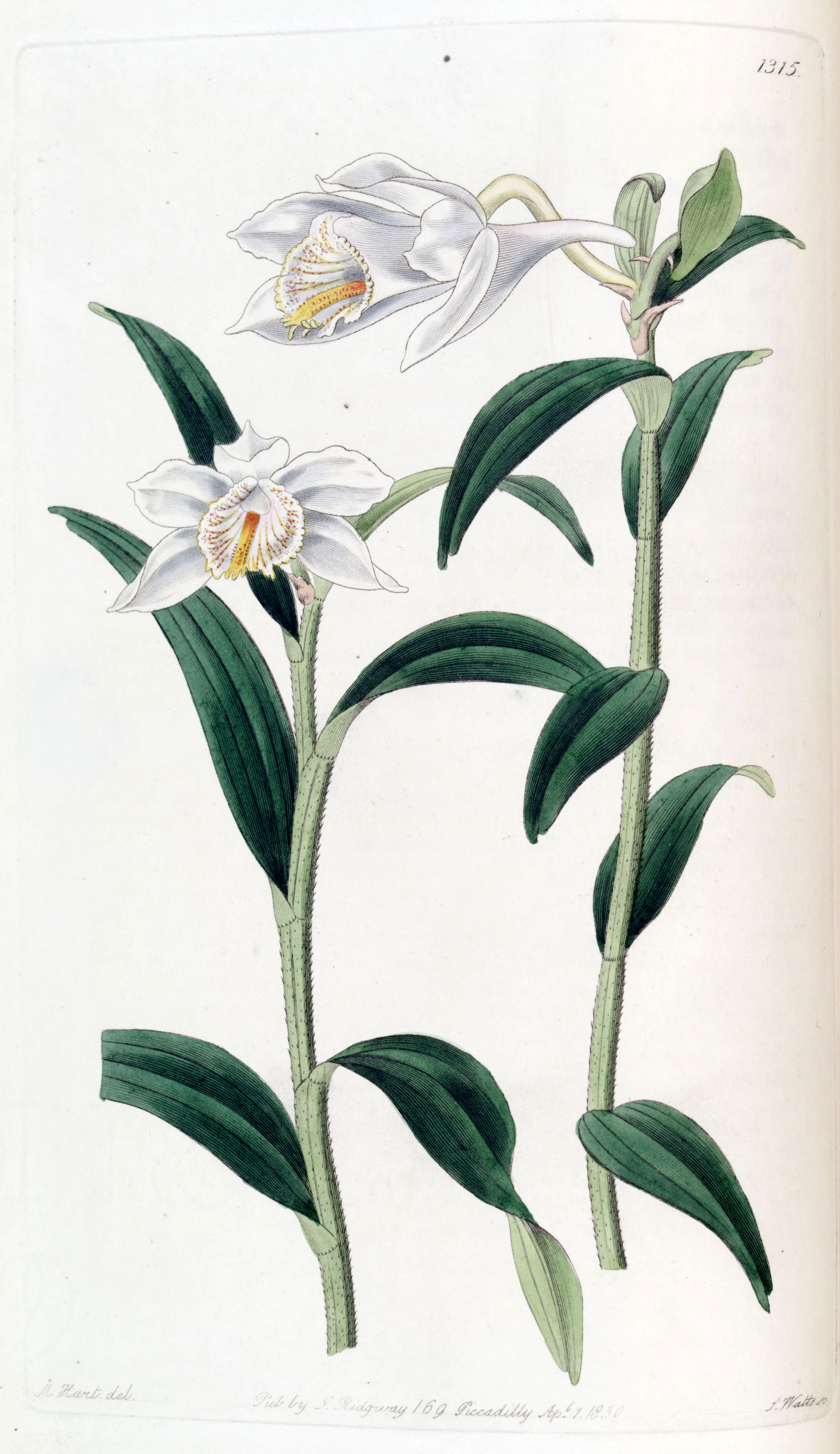
- 1830 illustration

Scientific classification
- Kingdom: Plantae
- Clade: Tracheophytes
- Clade: Angiosperms
- Clade: Monocots
- Order: Asparagales
- Family: Orchidaceae
- Subfamily: Epidendroideae
- Genus: Dendrobium
- Species: D. longicornu

Binomial name
- Dendrobium longicornu Lindl.

Synonyms
- Froscula hispida Raf.; Dendrobium flexuosum Griff.; Dendrobium hirsutum Griff.; Callista longicornis (Lindl.) Kuntze; Dendrobium bulleyi Rolfe

= Dendrobium longicornu =

Long-horned dendrobium

Species of orchid

Dendrobium longicornu, the long-horned dendrobium, is a species of orchid native to Asia.

It is native to southern China (Guangxi, Tibet, Yunnan), the Himalayas (Nepal, northeastern India, Bhutan, Bangladesh, Assam), and northern Indochina (Myanmar, Vietnam).
