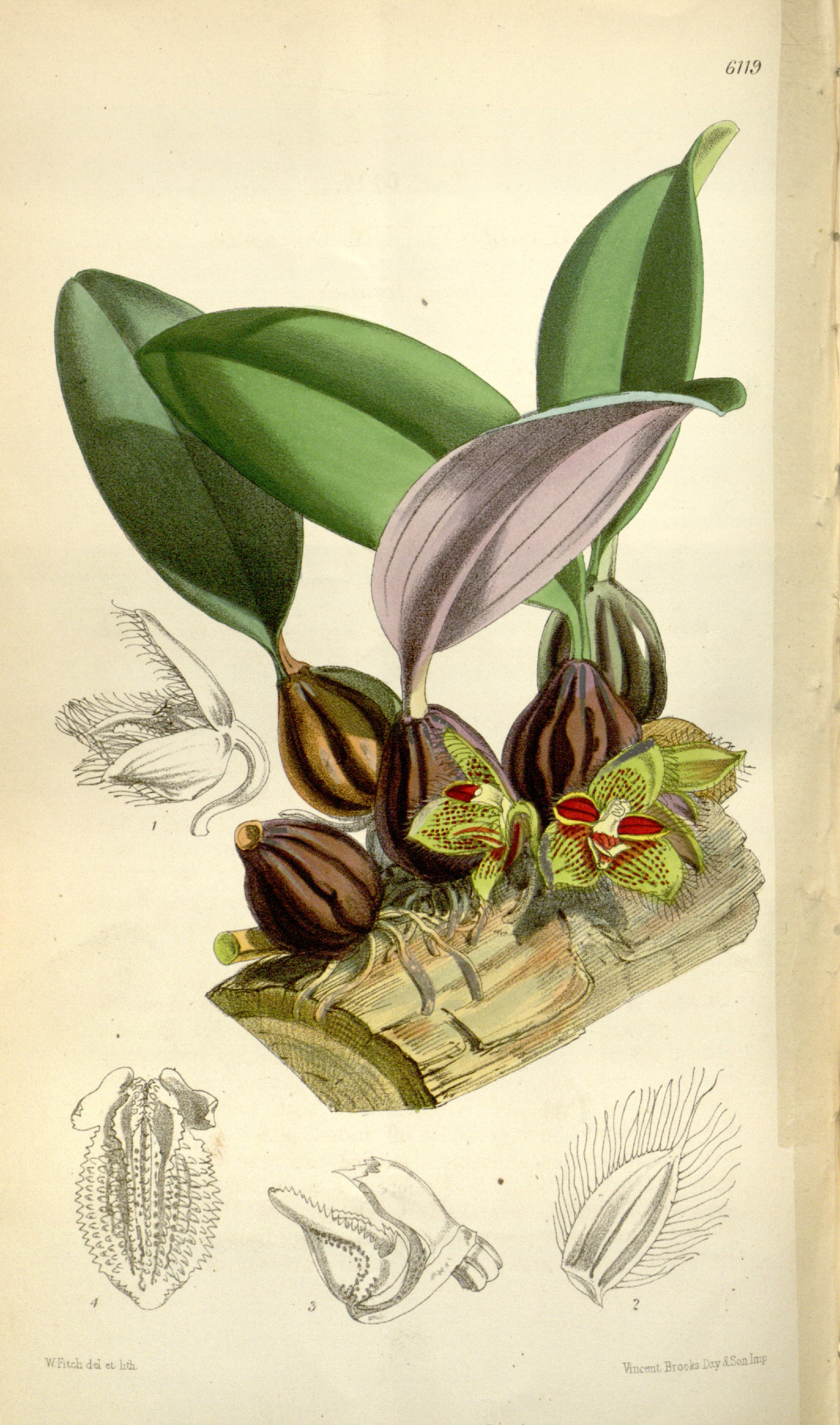

Scientific classification
- Kingdom: Plantae
- Clade: Tracheophytes
- Clade: Angiosperms
- Clade: Monocots
- Order: Asparagales
- Family: Orchidaceae
- Subfamily: Epidendroideae
- Genus: Bulbophyllum
- Species: B. dayanum

Binomial name
- Bulbophyllum dayanum Rchb.f. 1865

= Bulbophyllum dayanum =

Species of orchid

Bulbophyllum dayanum is a species of orchid in the genus Bulbophyllum found in India, Myanmar, Cambodia, Vietnam and Thailand.
