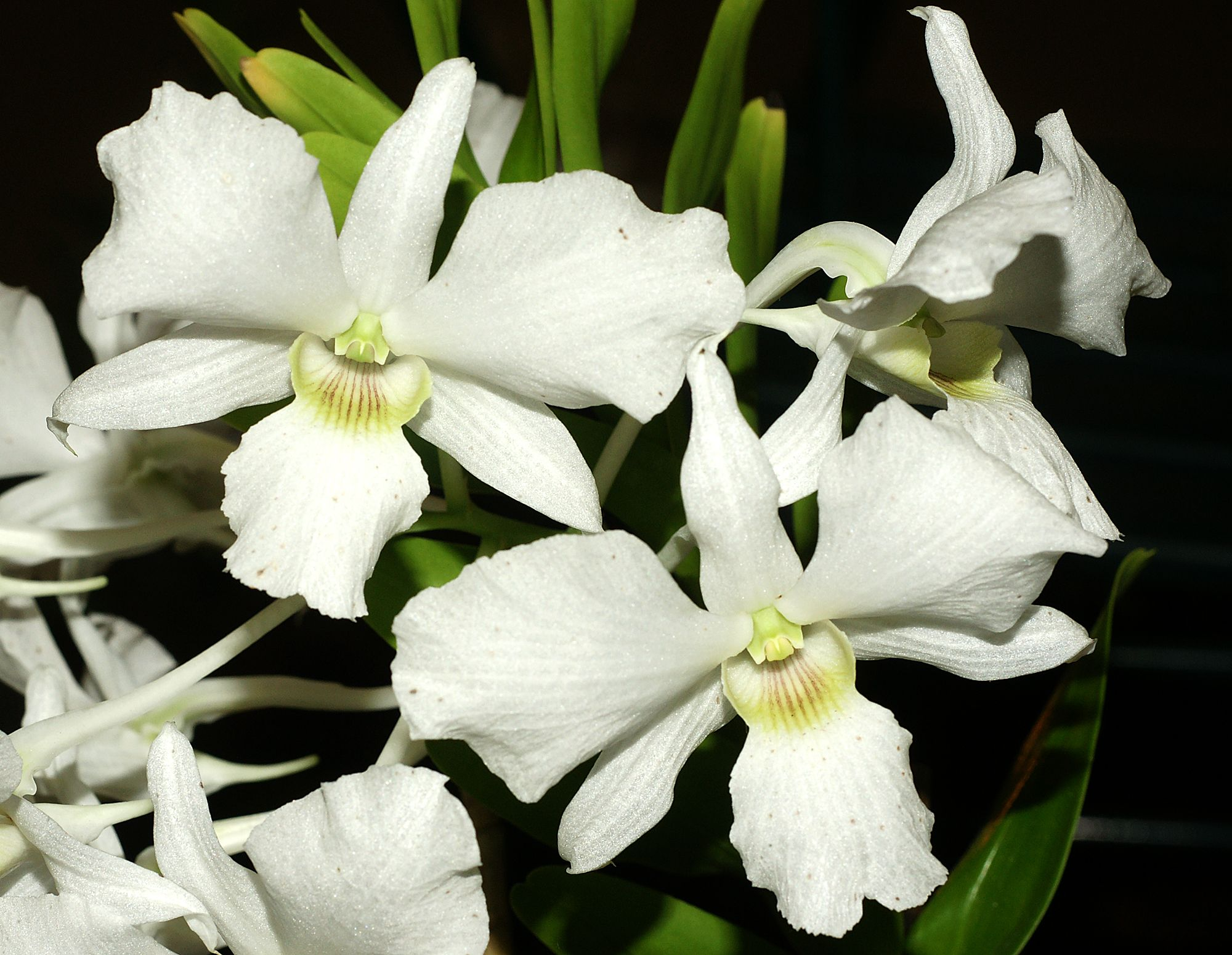

Conservation status
- Vulnerable (IUCN 3.1)

Scientific classification
- Kingdom: Plantae
- Clade: Tracheophytes
- Clade: Angiosperms
- Clade: Monocots
- Order: Asparagales
- Family: Orchidaceae
- Subfamily: Epidendroideae
- Genus: Dendrobium
- Species: D. sanderae

Binomial name
- Dendrobium sanderae Rolfe

Synonyms
- D. sanderae var. major Hort; D. sanderae var. milleri Quisumb.; D. sanderae var. parviflorum Anschutz ex Quisumb.; D. sanderae var. surigaense Quisumb.

= Dendrobium sanderae =

Mrs. Sander's dendrobium

Species of orchid

Dendrobium sanderae (Mrs. Sander's dendrobium) is a member of the family Orchidaceae endemic to the Philippines. It is found in the Montane Regions of Central Luzon, the Luzon tropical pine forests, north or the Philippines an epiphyte that grows on the trunks of pine trees (Pinus insularis) in pine forest located at altitudes of about 1000 to 1600 meters. This epiphyte of medium size has erect, slightly thick below the middle pseudobulbs; racemes are short for dendrobiums and inflorescences are present during the dry season. Sepals and petals are white while the lip is white with a green or yellow center.
