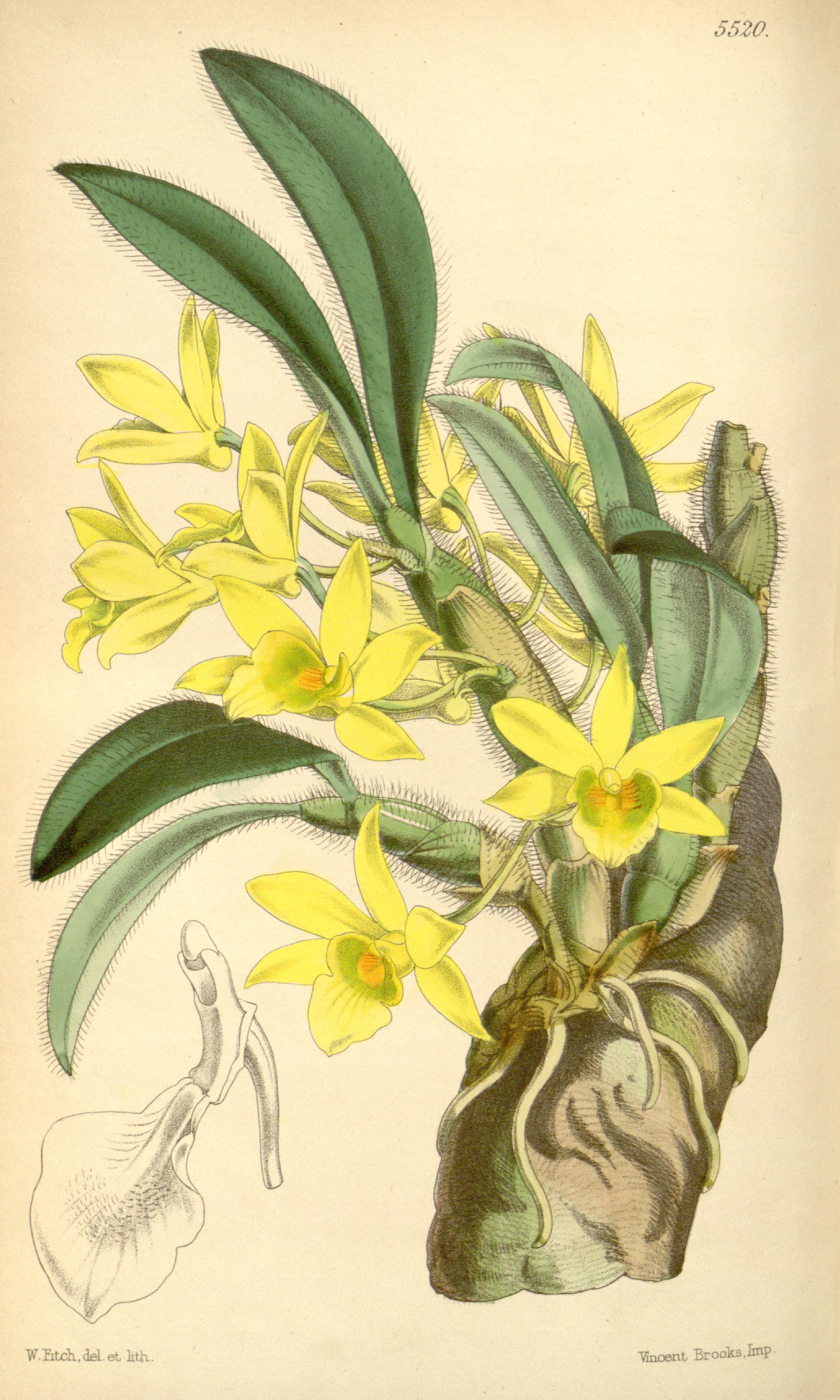
- 1864 illustration

Scientific classification
- Kingdom: Plantae
- Clade: Tracheophytes
- Clade: Angiosperms
- Clade: Monocots
- Order: Asparagales
- Family: Orchidaceae
- Subfamily: Epidendroideae
- Genus: Dendrobium
- Species: D. senile

Binomial name
- Dendrobium senile C.S.P.Parish & Rchb.f.

Synonyms
- Callista senilis (C.S.P.Parish & Rchb.f.) Kuntze

= Dendrobium senile =

White-haired dendrobium

Species of orchid

Dendrobium senile, commonly known as the white-haired dendrobium or old man orchid, is a species of flowering plant in the family Orchidaceae. It is native to Indochina (Thailand, Vietnam, Laos, Myanmar).
