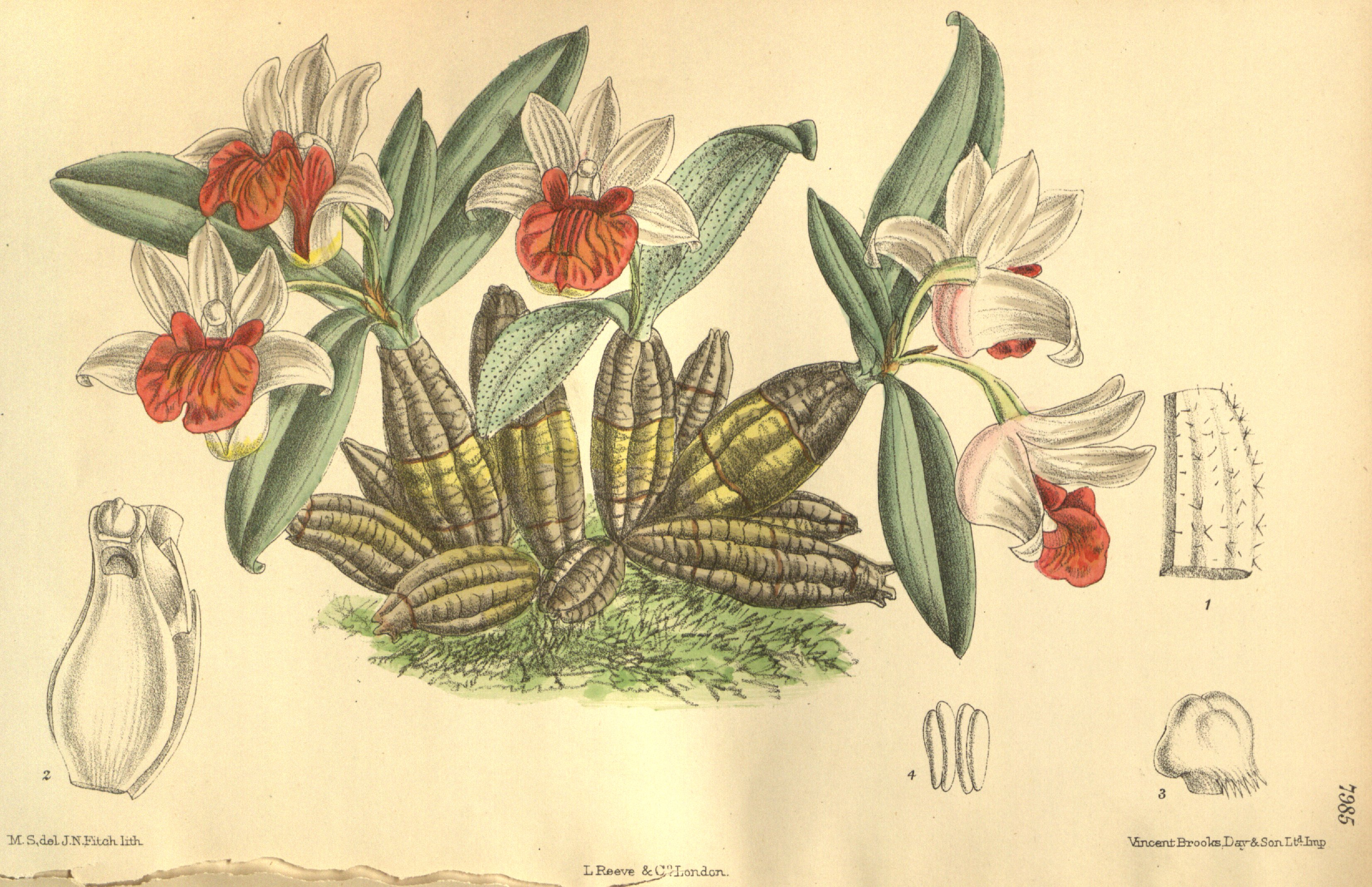
- 1904 illustration

Scientific classification
- Kingdom: Plantae
- Clade: Tracheophytes
- Clade: Angiosperms
- Clade: Monocots
- Order: Asparagales
- Family: Orchidaceae
- Subfamily: Epidendroideae
- Genus: Dendrobium
- Species: D. bellatulum

Binomial name
- Dendrobium bellatulum Rolfe (1903)

Synonyms
- Dendrobium bellatulum var. cleistogamia Pradhan (1979)

= Dendrobium bellatulum =

Enchanting dendrobium

Species of orchid

Dendrobium bellatulum (enchanting dendrobium) is a species of orchid. It is native to the eastern Himalayas (Yunnan, Assam, Arunachal Pradesh) and northern Indochina (Myanmar, Thailand, Vietnam, Laos).
