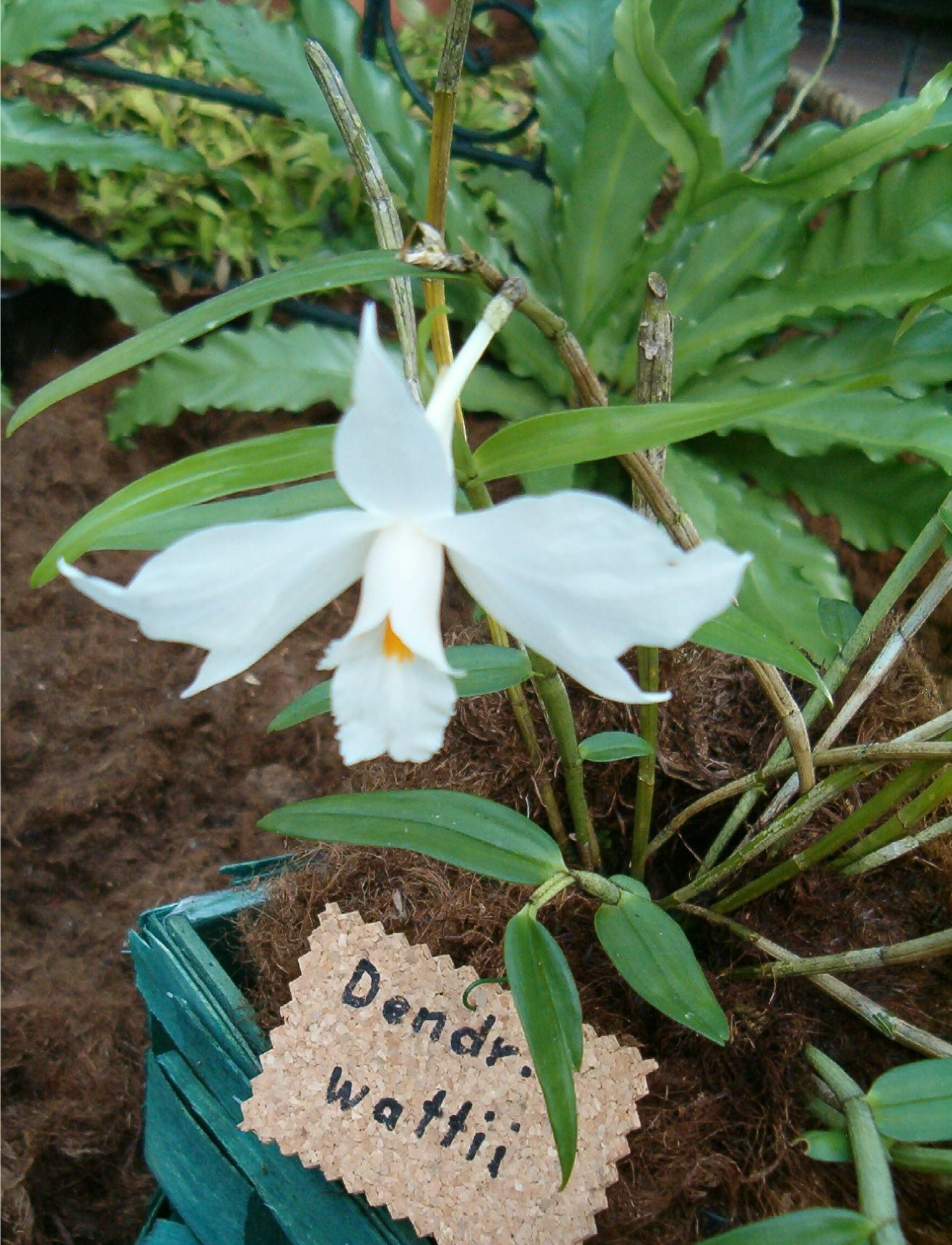

Scientific classification
- Kingdom: Plantae
- Clade: Tracheophytes
- Clade: Angiosperms
- Clade: Monocots
- Order: Asparagales
- Family: Orchidaceae
- Subfamily: Epidendroideae
- Genus: Dendrobium
- Species: D. wattii

Binomial name
- Dendrobium wattii (Hook.f.) Rchb.f.

Synonyms
- Dendrobium cariniferum var. wattii Hook.f. (Basionym); Callista wattii (Hook.f.) Kuntze); Dendrobium evrardii Gagnep., illegitimate

= Dendrobium wattii =

Species of orchid

Dendrobium wattii is a species of orchid. It is native to the Himalayas (Assam, Arunachal Pradesh, Yunnan) and to Indochina (Laos, Myanmar, Thailand, Vietnam).
