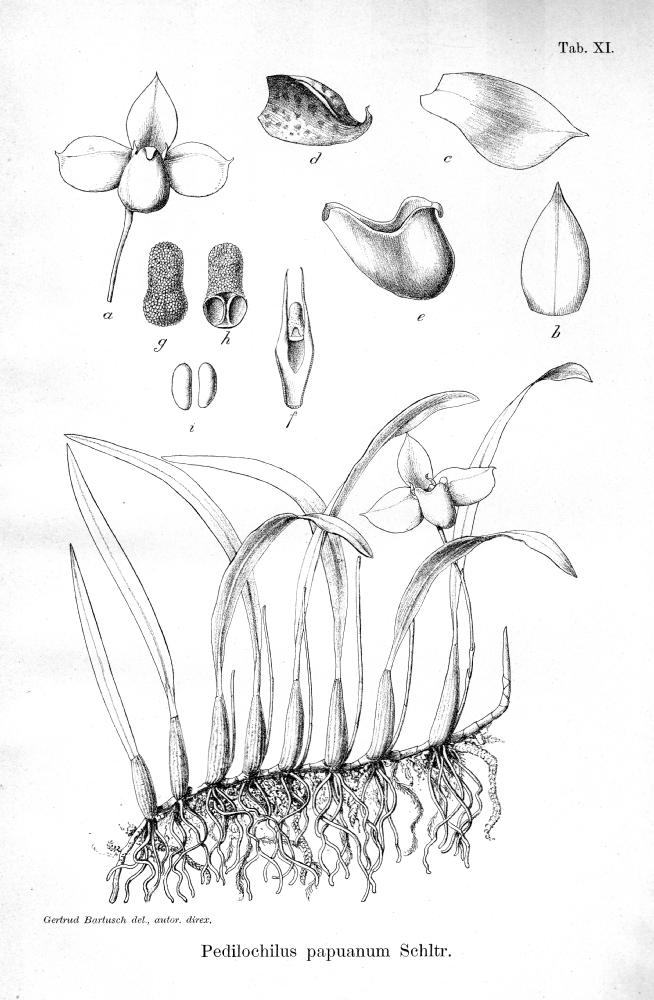

Scientific classification
- Kingdom: Plantae
- Clade: Tracheophytes
- Clade: Angiosperms
- Clade: Monocots
- Order: Asparagales
- Family: Orchidaceae
- Subfamily: Epidendroideae
- Genus: Bulbophyllum
- Species: B. papuanum

Binomial name
- Bulbophyllum papuanum (Schltr.) J.J.Verm., Schuit. & de Vogel

Synonyms
- Pedilochilus papuanus Schltr. in K.M.Schumann & C.A.G.Lauterbach

= Bulbophyllum papuanum =

Species of orchid

Bulbophyllum papuanum is a species in the family Orchidaceae. It grows as a pseudobulb epiphyte in forests at elevations between 1600 and 1800 meters above sea level. It is native to Papua New Guinea. It was formerly known as Pedilochilus papuanus and was the type species of the genus Pedilochilus, now synonymous with Bulbophyllum.
