= Bulbophyllum crabro =

Scientific classification
- Kingdom: Plantae
- Clade: Tracheophytes
- Clade: Angiosperms
- Clade: Monocots
- Order: Asparagales
- Family: Orchidaceae
- Subfamily: Epidendroideae
- Genus: Bulbophyllum
- Species: B. crabro

Binomial name
- Bulbophyllum crabro (C.S.P.Parish & Rchb.f.) J.J.Verm., Schuit. & de Vogel

Synonyms
- Epicranthes barbata (Lindl.) Rchb.f.; Monomeria barbata Lindl.; Monomeria crabro C.S.P.Parish & Rchb.f.

Species of orchid

Bulbophyllum crabro, commonly called "Kam Pu Ma" in Thai, is a small orchid that grows as an epiphyte or is sometimes found as lithophyte. It grows in rainforests 1,600-2,000 m above sea level. It was formerly known as Monomeria barbata and was the type species of the genus Monomeria, now synonymous with Bulbophyllum. It is used in traditional Chinese medicine for treating coughs, pulmonary tuberculosis and trauma.

The plant contains phenanthrenoids.

== Characteristics ==
The oval pseudobulb with one leaf is 10–15 cm long and 3–3.5 cm wide.

== Distribution ==
Bulbophyllum crabro was originally discovered in Nepal. This species is increasingly rare in the wild. It is found in the rain forests of Burma, Nepal, Vietnam, north-east India, China (Yunnan and Xizang provinces) and Thailand.
