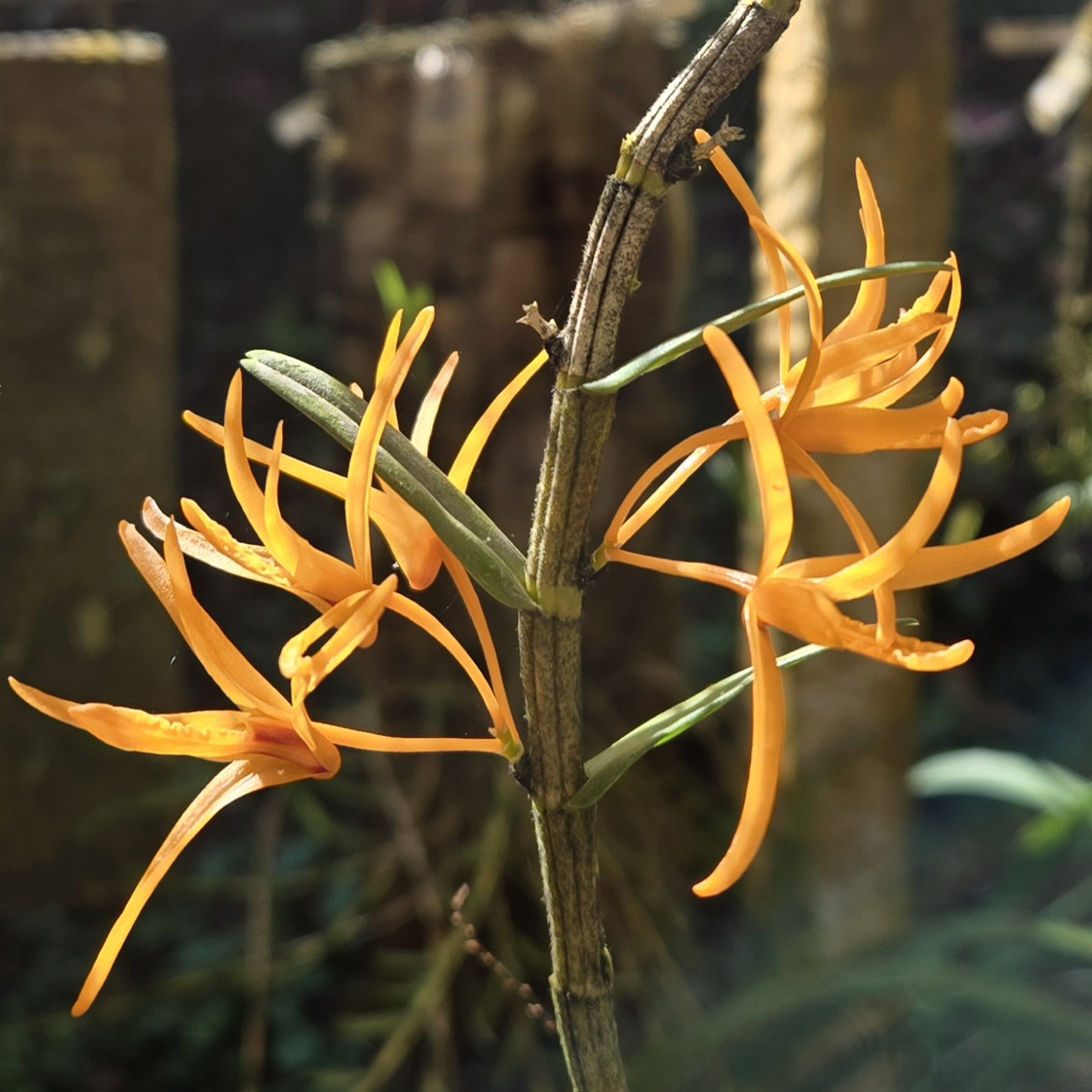

Scientific classification
- Kingdom: Plantae
- Clade: Embryophytes
- Clade: Tracheophytes
- Clade: Spermatophytes
- Clade: Angiosperms
- Clade: Monocots
- Order: Asparagales
- Family: Orchidaceae
- Subfamily: Epidendroideae
- Genus: Dendrobium
- Species: D. jerdonianum

Binomial name
- Dendrobium jerdonianum Wight

= Dendrobium jerdonianum =

Species of plant

Dendrobium jerdonianum is a species of epiphytic orchid found in the Western Ghats of India and in Sri Lanka. The orange flowers were named after the naturalist Thomas C. Jerdon by his friend Robert Wight. He described it based on specimens from Coorg. He noted that it had ovate lanceolate and succulent leaves forked at the tip. The flowers are borne in a raceme with 2 or 3 flowers. The flowers have long pedicels with the lip sinuately undulated on the margin. It is closely related to D. nutantiflorum of Sri Lanka.
