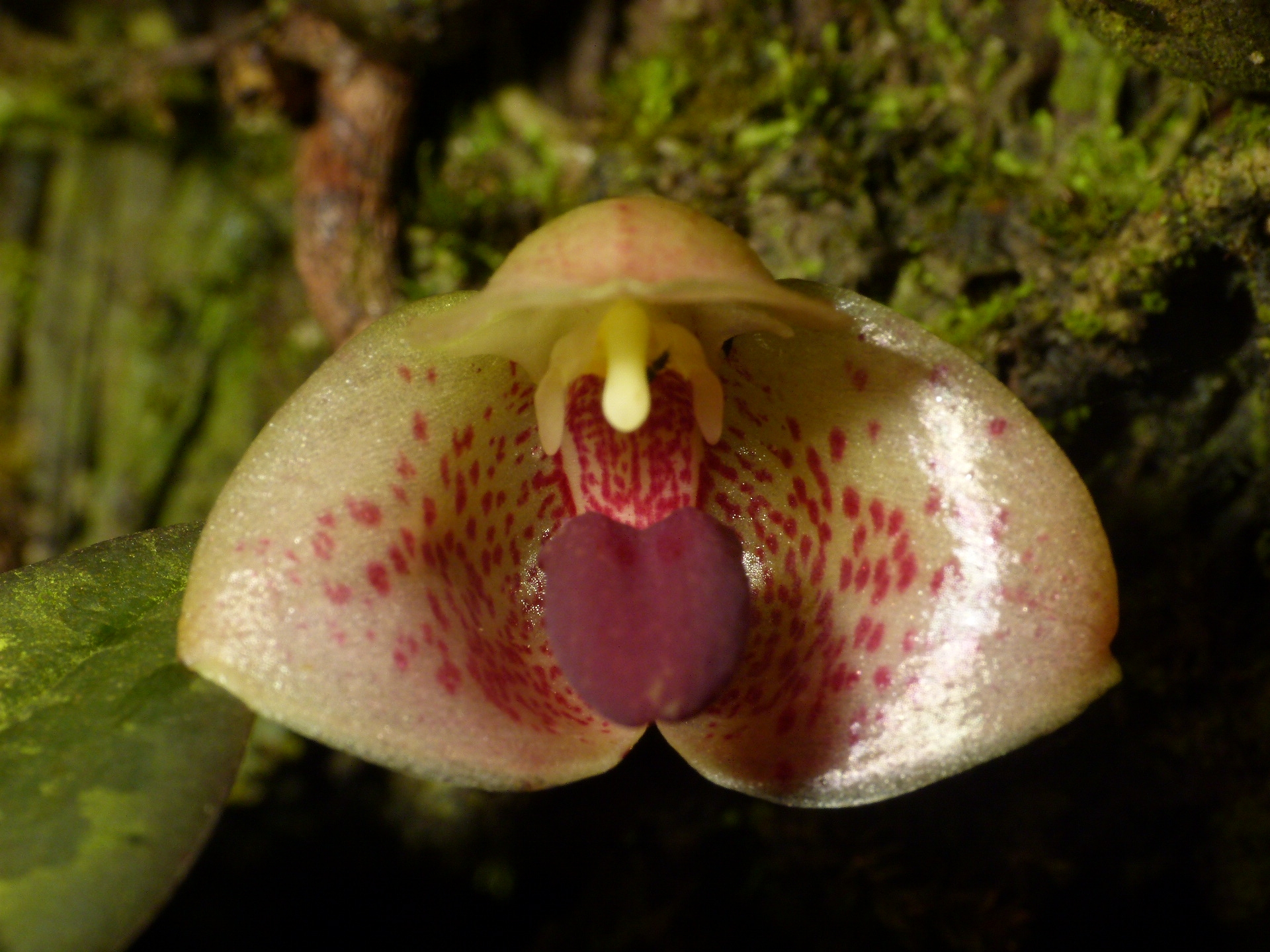

Scientific classification
- Kingdom: Plantae
- Clade: Tracheophytes
- Clade: Angiosperms
- Clade: Monocots
- Order: Asparagales
- Family: Orchidaceae
- Subfamily: Epidendroideae
- Genus: Bulbophyllum
- Species: B. bonaccordense

Binomial name
- Bulbophyllum bonaccordense (C.S.Kumar) J.J.Verm.

Synonyms
- Trias bonaccordensis C.S.Kumar

= Bulbophyllum bonaccordense =

Species of orchid from India

Bulbophyllum bonaccordense is a species of orchid native to India. This species was first formally named by C. Sathish Kumar in 1989 as Trias bonaccordensis. It was transferred to the genus Bulbophyllum in 2014.. It is most closely related B. stocksii Benth. ex Hook.f. but flowers are creamy yellow with crimson red spots throughout, sepals 10-veined, petals 3-veined and operculum papillose at the head region. B. stocksii has uniformly ochre yellow flowers without any spot, sepals 7-veined, petals 1-veined and operculum without any papilla.
