= Bulbophyllum arunachalense =

Conservation status
- Critically Endangered (IUCN 3.1)

Scientific classification
- Kingdom: Plantae
- Clade: Tracheophytes
- Clade: Angiosperms
- Clade: Monocots
- Order: Asparagales
- Family: Orchidaceae
- Subfamily: Epidendroideae
- Genus: Bulbophyllum
- Species: B. arunachalense

Binomial name
- Bulbophyllum arunachalense (A.N.Rao) J.J.Verm., Schuit. & de Vogel

Synonyms
- Ione arunachalense A.N.Rao; Sunipia arunachalense (A.N.Rao) J.M.H.Shaw

Species of orchid

Bulbophyllum arunachalense is a species of critically endangered orchid found only in Arunachal Pradesh in India. It was initially described as Ione arunachalense by Nageswara Rao and later moved to the genus Bulbophyllum.

== Description ==
This orchid is epiphytic herb like orchid with small one leaf and one flower. The single leaf is about 3 cm and oblong. The flower is crimson colored and 2 cm long. The lip is 1 cm long. It can be differentiated by similar looking Bulbophyllum minutius found in Thailand by petioled leaves and single flower inflorescence.

== Distribution ==
This species of orchid is restricted to Talle valley in Arunachal Pradesh with no further records from anywhere else as of 2022.

== Ecology ==
This epiphytic orchid was found growing on tree trunks inside the wet evergreen subtropical forests of Talle valley at an altitude of 1200 to 1400 meters. It flowers in June.

== Etymology ==
This species was named after the type specimen of the species, the state of Arunachal Pradesh.

== Conservation and threats ==
As per 2022 IUCN assessment, this species has a very narrow distribution range with hardly any information beyond the known location. Habitat degradation and forest product extraction are the threats to this species.
