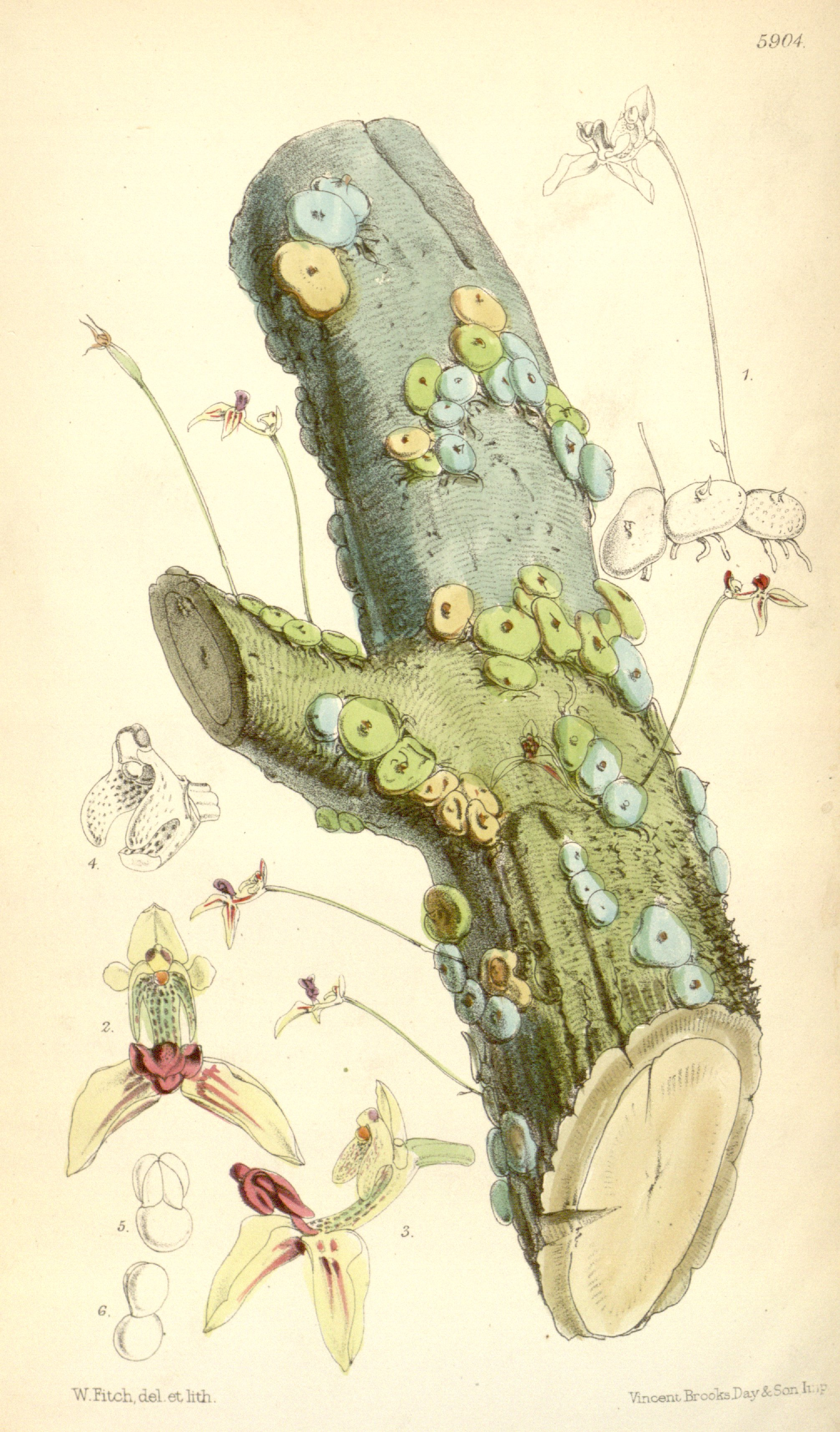

Scientific classification
- Kingdom: Plantae
- Clade: Tracheophytes
- Clade: Angiosperms
- Clade: Monocots
- Order: Asparagales
- Family: Orchidaceae
- Subfamily: Epidendroideae
- Genus: Bulbophyllum
- Species: B. drymoda

Binomial name
- Bulbophyllum drymoda J.J.Verm., Schuit. & de Vogel

Synonyms
- Drymoda picta Lindl.

= Bulbophyllum drymoda =

Species of orchid

Bulbophyllum drymoda is a species of orchid in the genus Bulbophyllum. It was formerly the type species of the genus Drymoda, now synonymous with Bulbophyllum. It is native to Myanmar, Thailand, and Vietnam.
