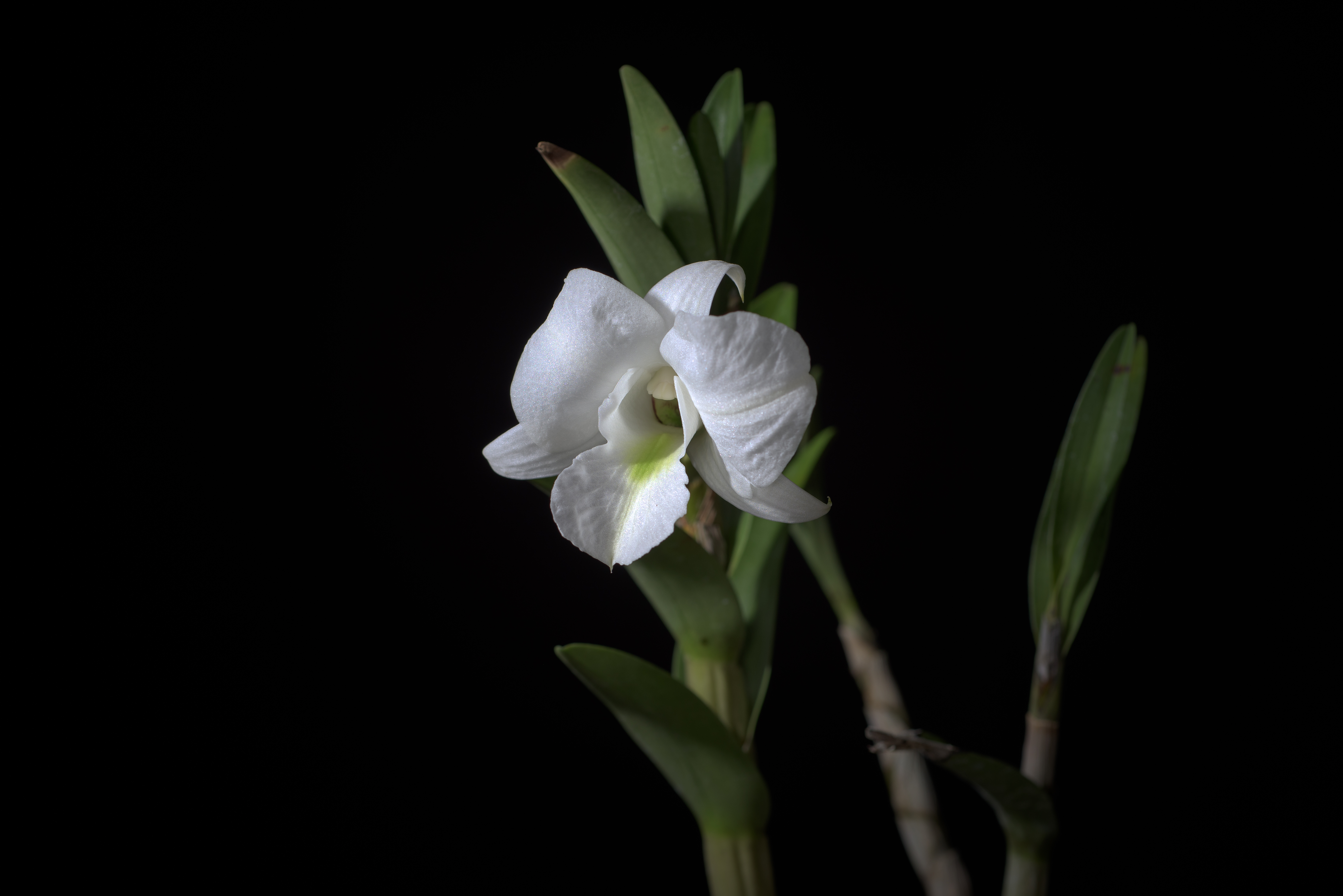

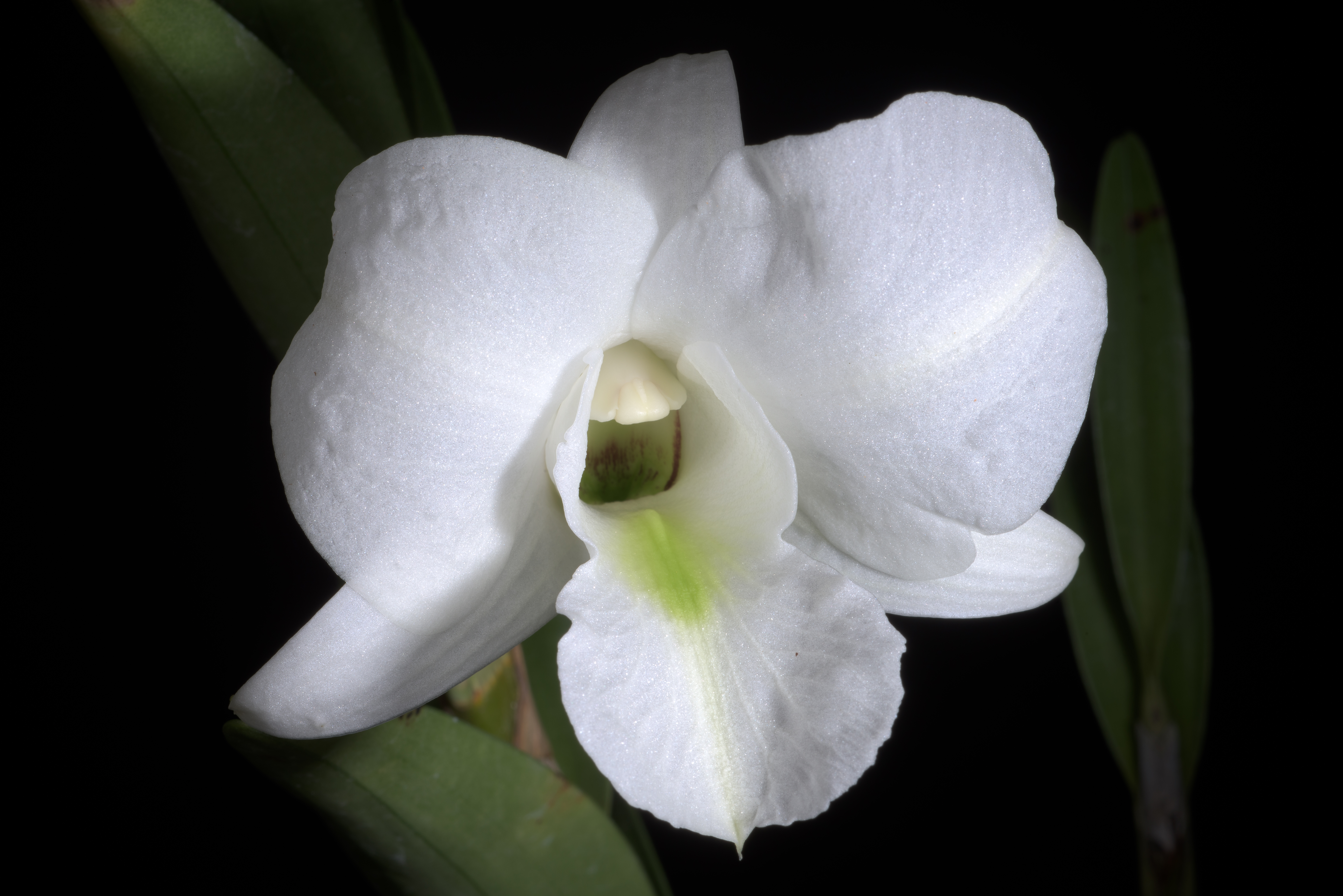

Conservation status
- Critically Endangered (IUCN 3.1)

Scientific classification
- Kingdom: Plantae
- Clade: Tracheophytes
- Clade: Angiosperms
- Clade: Monocots
- Order: Asparagales
- Family: Orchidaceae
- Subfamily: Epidendroideae
- Genus: Dendrobium
- Species: D. schuetzei

Binomial name
- Dendrobium schuetzei Rolfe

= Dendrobium schuetzei =

Species of orchid from the Philippines

Dendrobium schuetzei, sometimes called Schuetze's dendrobium, is a species of orchid endemic to northeastern Mindanao, Philippines. Though widely grown as an ornamental, it is classified as Critically Endangered by the IUCN Red List of Threatened Species due to habitat loss and unsustainable harvesting from the wild.

== Taxonomy ==
Dendrobium schuetzei was first described by the British botanist Robert Allen Rolfe in 1911. It is a member of the genus Dendrobium in the orchid family Orchidaceae.

== Distribution ==
Dendrobium schuetzei is an epiphyte. It is endemic to northeastern Mindanao, in the provinces of Surigao del Norte, Surigao del Sur, Agusan del Norte, and Agusan del Sur of the Caraga Region. They grow at elevations of 300 m (980 ft) above sea level.

== Description ==
Dendrobium schuetzei grows to around 6 to 16 in (15 to 41 cm) tall. The stems are somewhat cylindrical and erect, thickened at the middle and lined with grooves. The leaves are elliptic to oblong in shape, leathery, and somewhat spreading, each around 3 to 4 in (7.6 to 10.2 cm) in length and 1 to 1.25 in (2.5 to 3.2 cm) in width.

The flowers of D. schuetzei are large and fragrant, measuring around 3 to 4 in (7.6 to 10.2 cm) across. They are white in color, outlined with some green on the outer edges, and with a tinge of purple at the base of the flower. The sepals are triangular and keeled, narrowing to a point. The lateral sepals are sometimes longer than the dorsal sepal. The petals are large and disk-shaped with short sharply-pointed tips. The lip (labellum) is three-lobed, with the inner lobes curving inwards, and the central lobe curving outwards.

== Conservation and uses ==
Dendrobium schuetzei is classified as Critically Endangered by the IUCN Red List of Threatened Species. Its main threat is habitat loss due to urbanization which has severely fragmented its populations. They are also collected from the wild for the horticultural trade. Dendrobium schuetzei is widely grown as an ornamental plant.

== See also ==
- List of threatened species of the Philippines
