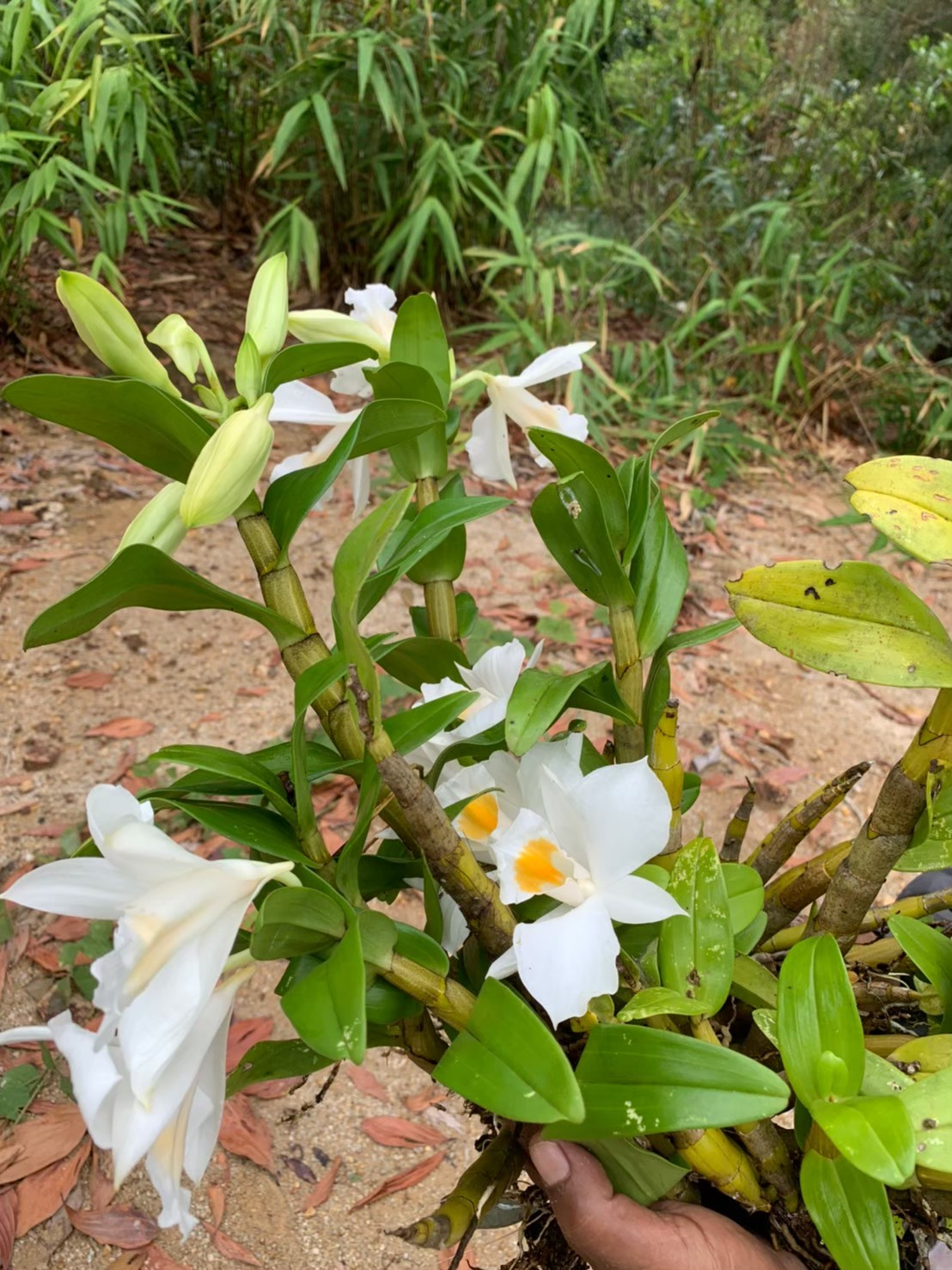
- In Thailand

Scientific classification
- Kingdom: Plantae
- Clade: Embryophytes
- Clade: Tracheophytes
- Clade: Angiosperms
- Clade: Monocots
- Order: Asparagales
- Family: Orchidaceae
- Subfamily: Epidendroideae
- Genus: Dendrobium
- Species: D. formosum

Binomial name
- Dendrobium formosum Roxb. ex Lindl.

Synonyms
- Dendrobium formosum var. giganteum W.Bull; Callista formosa (Roxb. ex Lindl.) Kuntze

= Dendrobium formosum =

Beautiful giant-flowered dendrobium

Species of orchid from Asia

Dendrobium formosum (beautiful giant-flowered dendrobium) is a species of orchid.

It is native to the Himalayas (Nepal, Bhutan, Assam, India, Bangladesh), northern Indochina (Thailand, Myanmar, Vietnam) and the Andaman Islands, and widely cultivated elsewhere as an ornamental.
