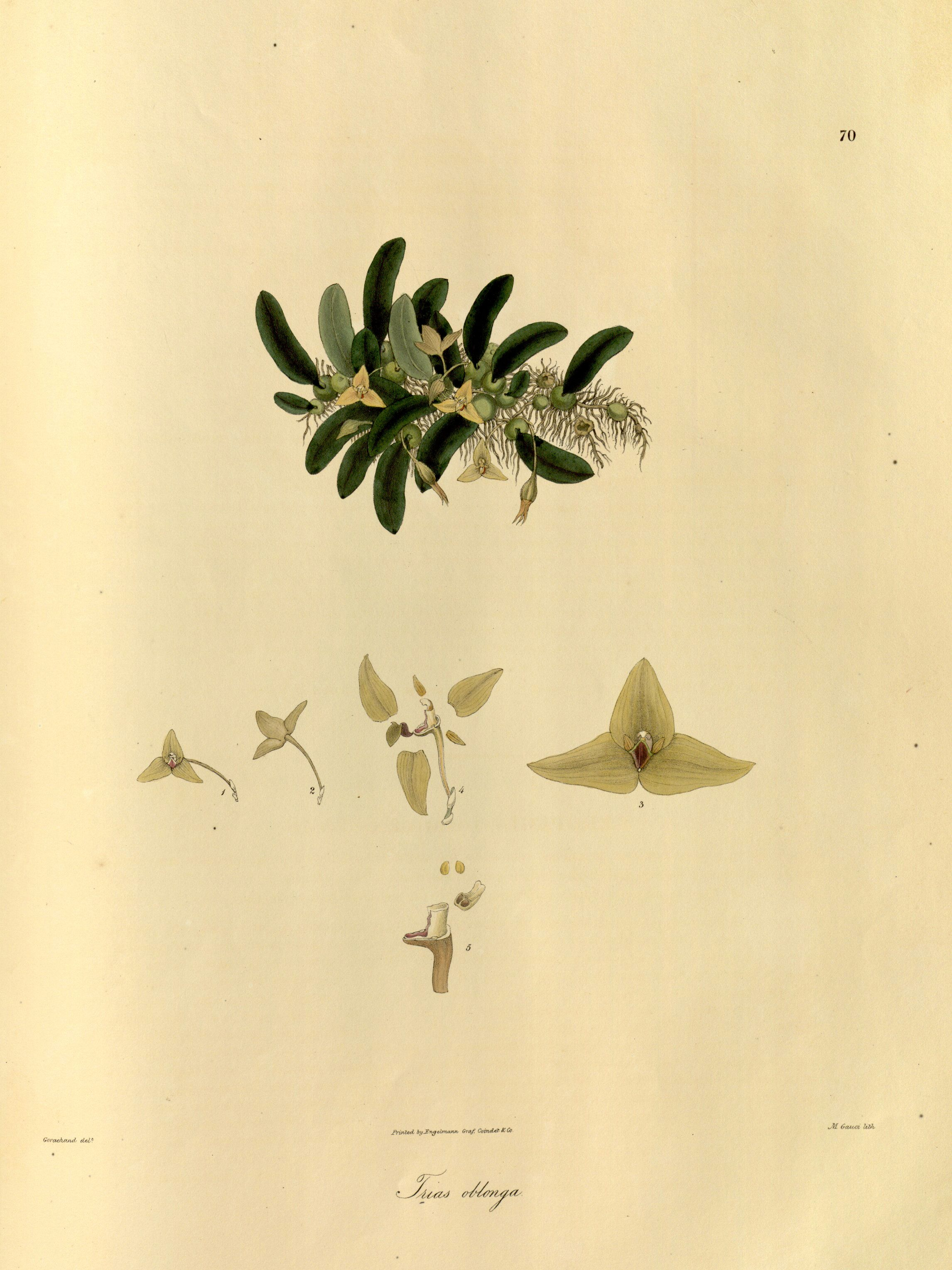
- Illustration from Nathaniel Wallich's Plantae Asiaticae Rariores

Scientific classification
- Kingdom: Plantae
- Clade: Tracheophytes
- Clade: Angiosperms
- Clade: Monocots
- Order: Asparagales
- Family: Orchidaceae
- Subfamily: Epidendroideae
- Genus: Bulbophyllum
- Species: B. oblongum

Binomial name
- Bulbophyllum oblongum (Lindl.) Rchb.f.

Synonyms
- Trias oblonga Lindl.; Trias ovata Lindl.; Bulbophyllum moulmeinense Rchb.f.; Dendrobium tripterum Wall. ex Hook.f.; Bulbophyllum burkillii Gage

= Bulbophyllum oblongum =

Species of orchid

Bulbophyllum oblongum is a species of orchid in the genus Bulbophyllum and is found from India to Indochina.
