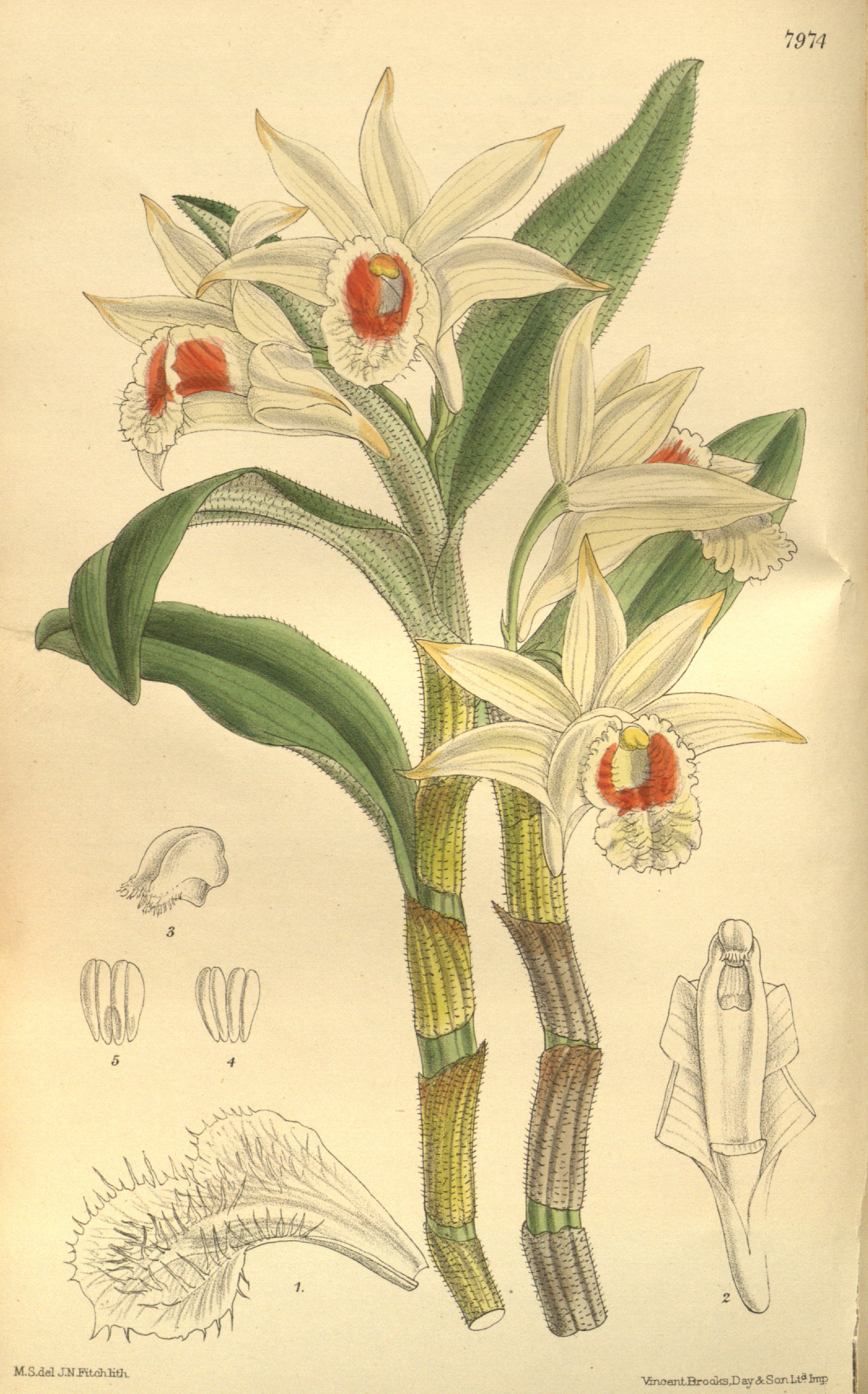
- 1903 illustration

Scientific classification
- Kingdom: Plantae
- Clade: Tracheophytes
- Clade: Angiosperms
- Clade: Monocots
- Order: Asparagales
- Family: Orchidaceae
- Subfamily: Epidendroideae
- Genus: Dendrobium
- Species: D. williamsonii

Binomial name
- Dendrobium williamsonii Day & Rchb.f.

Synonyms
- Callista williamsonii (Day & Rchb.f.) Kuntze (1891)

= Dendrobium williamsonii =

Williamson's dendrobium

Species of orchid

Dendrobium williamsonii is a species of orchid, commonly known as Williamson's dendrobium. It is native to southern China (Guangxi, Hainan, Yunnan), Assam, and Indochina (Thailand, Myanmar, Vietnam). It is an epiphyte and grows on tree trunks in forests.
