= Bulbophyllum rimannii =

Scientific classification
- Kingdom: Plantae
- Clade: Tracheophytes
- Clade: Angiosperms
- Clade: Monocots
- Order: Asparagales
- Family: Orchidaceae
- Subfamily: Epidendroideae
- Genus: Bulbophyllum
- Species: B. rimannii

Binomial name
- Bulbophyllum rimannii (Rchb.f.) J.J.Verm.

Synonyms
- Acrochaene rimannii Rchb.f.

Species of orchid

Bulbophyllum rimannii is a species of orchid. Previously known as Acrochaene rimannii, it was placed within Bulbophyllum in 2014. It is native to Assam, Sikkim, Bhutan, Myanmar and Thailand.
