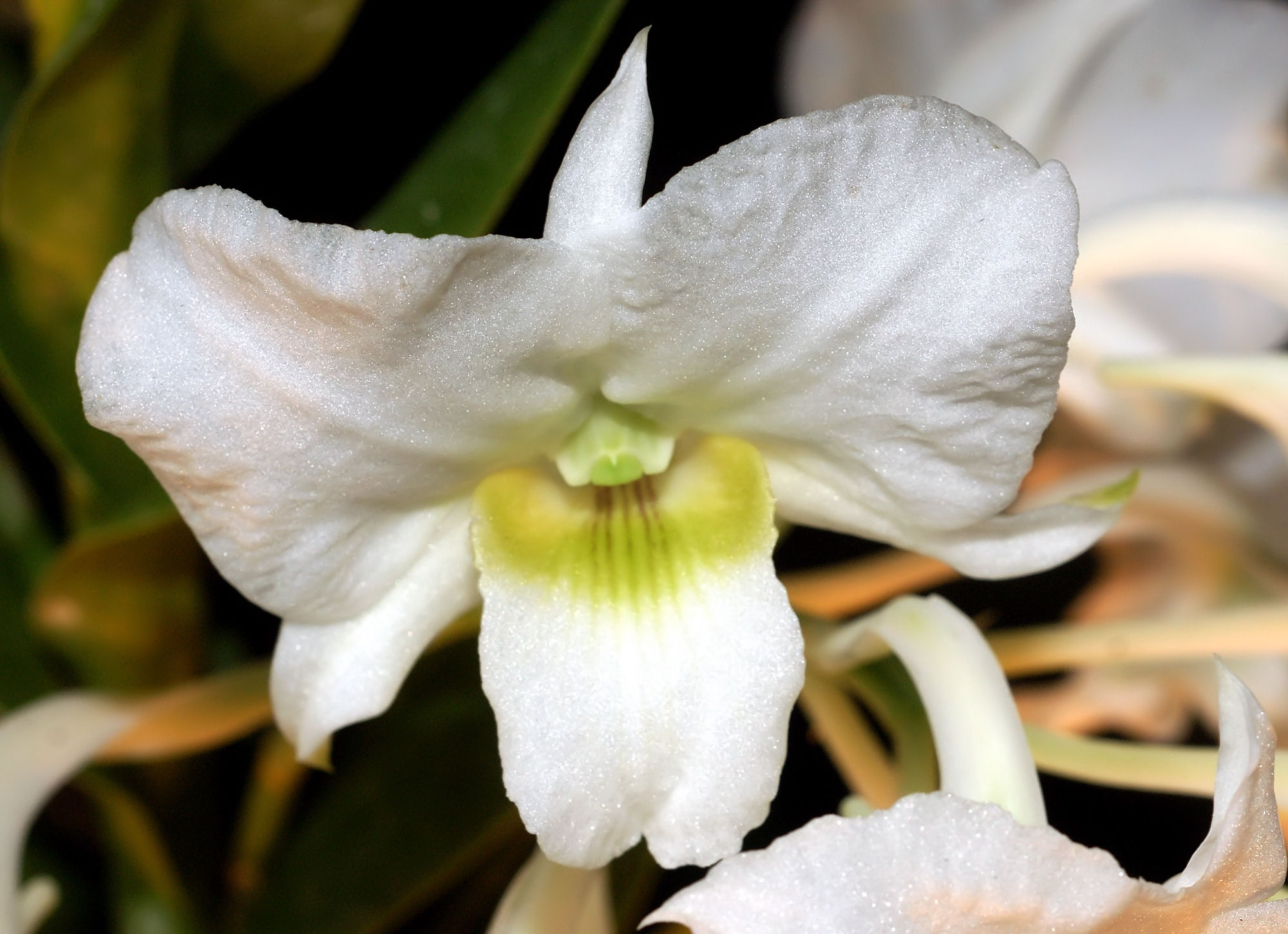

Scientific classification
- Kingdom: Plantae
- Clade: Tracheophytes
- Clade: Angiosperms
- Clade: Monocots
- Order: Asparagales
- Family: Orchidaceae
- Subfamily: Epidendroideae
- Genus: Dendrobium
- Species: D. dearei

Binomial name
- Dendrobium dearei Rchb., 1882

Synonyms
- Callista dearii (Rchb. f.) Kuntze 1891

= Dendrobium dearei =

Deare's dendrobium

Species of orchid

Dendrobium dearei (Deare's dendrobium) is a species of orchid of the genus Dendrobium. It is found in the Borneo and the Philippines. It grows to a maximum size of 7.5 cm.
