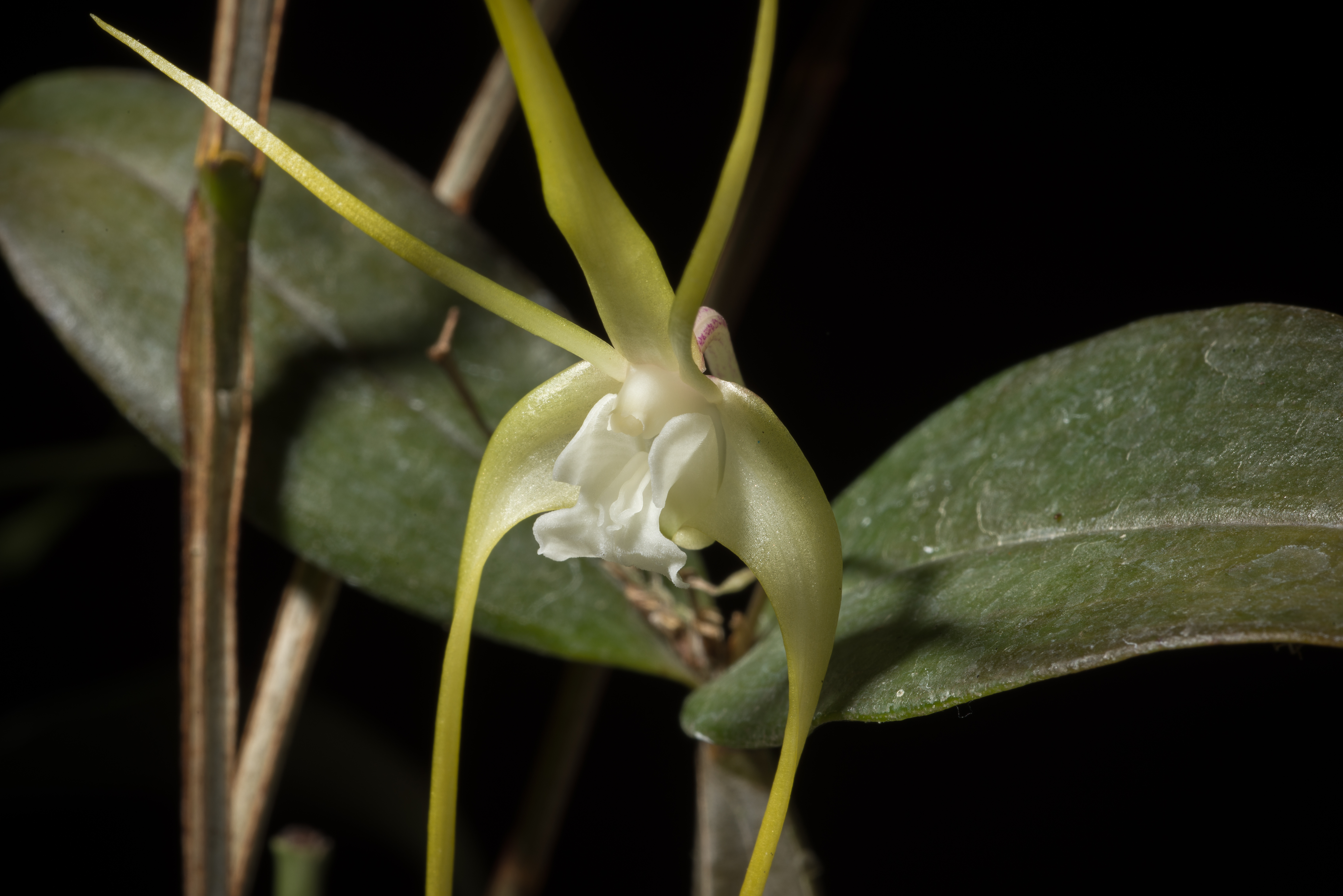
- Dendrobium tetragonum fma. album

Scientific classification
- Kingdom: Plantae
- Clade: Embryophytes
- Clade: Tracheophytes
- Clade: Angiosperms
- Clade: Monocots
- Order: Asparagales
- Family: Orchidaceae
- Subfamily: Epidendroideae
- Genus: Dendrobium
- Section: Dendrobium sect. Dendrocoryne; Lindley 1842

Type species
- Dendrobium tetragonum

Species
- See text

Synonyms
- Dendrocoryne (Lindl.) Brieger; Dendrobium sect. Speciosa Kraenzl.; Dendrobium subsect. Speciosae Benth. & Hook. f.

= Dendrobium sect. Dendrocoryne =

Subgenus of flowering plants

Dendrobium section Dendrocoryne is a subgenus of orchids in the genus Dendrobium.

== Description ==
Plants in this section have nodded pseudobulbs with two to six leaves at the apex with no leaf sheathing bases.

== Distribution ==
Plants from this section are found in Australia and New Caledonia.

== Species ==
Dendrobium section Dendrocoryne comprises the following species:

Image	Name	Distribution	Elevation (m)
	Dendrobium adae F.M. Bailey 1884	Queensland, Australia	700–1,220 metres (2,300–4,000 ft)
	Dendrobium cacatua M.A.Clem. & D.L. Jones 1989	Queensland, Australia	0–1,600 metres (0–5,249 ft)
	Dendrobium falcorostrum Fitzgerald 1876	Queensland and New South Wales, Australia	700–1,400 metres (2,300–4,600 ft)
	Dendrobium fleckeri Rupp & C.T. White 1937	Queensland, Australia	800–1,500 metres (2,600–4,900 ft)
	Dendrobium gracilicaule F. Muell. 1894	Queensland and New South Wales, Australia; Lord Howe Island, the Kermadec Islands, Fiji, New Caledonia and Vanuatu	0–600 metres (0–1,969 ft)
	Dendrobium jonesii Rendle 1901	Queensland, Australia	150–1,400 metres (490–4,590 ft)
	Dendrobium kingianum Bidwill ex Lindley 1844	Queensland and New South Wales, Australia	50–1,200 metres (160–3,940 ft)
	Dendrobium macropus (Endl.) Rchb.f. ex Lindl. 1858	Norfolk Island	200–300 metres (660–980 ft)
	Dendrobium moorei F. Muell. 1869	Lord Howe Island	0–1,000 metres (0–3,281 ft)
	Dendrobium speciosum J. E Smith 1804	New South Wales, Victoria and Queensland Australia and New Guinea	0–900 metres (0–2,953 ft)
	Dendrobium tetragonum Cunningham ex Lindley 1839	New South Wales and northern Queensland Australia	500–1,200 metres (1,600–3,900 ft)

== Natural Hybrids ==
Image	Name	Parentage	Distribution
	Dendrobium × delicatum (F.M.Bailey) F.M.Bailey 1902	Dendrobium kingianum × Dendrobium speciosum	Queensland and New South Wales Australia
	Dendrobium x gracillimum (Rupp) Leaney 1934	Dendrobium gracilicaule × Dendrobium speciosum	Queensland, Australia
