= Spider orchid =

Spider orchid typically refers to the orchid genus Caladenia as a whole.

It may also mean one of the following:

- Several Corybas species, including
  - Corybas macranthus
  - Corybas trilobus
- Dendrobium tetragonum (Common spider orchid, Tree spider orchid)
- Bartholina burmanniana
- Several Ophrys species, including
  - Ophrys fuciflora (Late spider orchid)
  - Ophrys sphegodes (Early spider orchid)
- Members of the genus Brassia
