= Leopard orchid =

Leopard orchid may refer to several genera and species of orchid:

- Ansellia
- Diuris pardina
- Dendrobium gracilicaule
