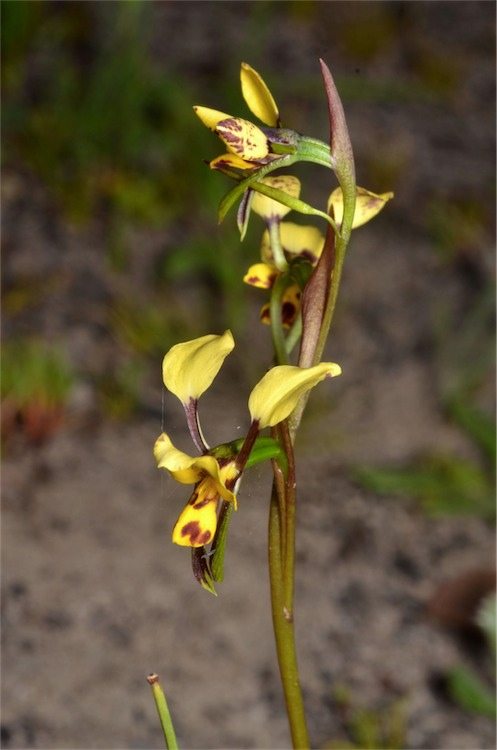
- In Grampians National Park

Scientific classification
- Kingdom: Plantae
- Clade: Tracheophytes
- Clade: Angiosperms
- Clade: Monocots
- Order: Asparagales
- Family: Orchidaceae
- Subfamily: Orchidoideae
- Tribe: Diurideae
- Genus: Diuris
- Species: D. leopardina

Binomial name
- Diuris leopardina D.L.Jones & R.J.Bates

= Diuris leopardina =

Species of orchid

Diuris leopardina is a species of orchid that is endemic to south-eastern continental Australia. It has between two or three grass-like leaves of different lengths, and a flowering stem with up to five pale yellow to butter yellow flowers with reddish brown or purple marks and patterns, and leopard-like spots on the back.

== Description ==
Diuris leopardina is a tuberous, terrestrial herb with two or three erect, grass-like, linear leaves 30–150 mm (1.2–5.9 in) long and of different lengths. Up to five pale yellow to butter yellow flowers 15–25 mm (0.59–0.98 in) in diameter are borne on a flowering stem usually 100–300 mm (3.9–11.8 in) tall. The dorsal sepal is oblong, 10–15 mm (0.39–0.59 in) long and 10–12 mm (0.39–0.47 in) wide, the lateral sepals linear, purplish brown with green edges, 10–15 mm (0.39–0.59 in) long and about 2 mm (0.079 in) wide. The petals are more or less erect, broadly egg-shaped to round, 10–14 mm (0.39–0.55 in) long and 8–12 mm (0.31–0.47 in) wide. The labellum has three lobes, the middle lobe oblong, 7–11 mm (0.28–0.43 in) long and 5–7 mm (0.20–0.28 in) wide and the side lobes spread widely, pressed against the dorsal sepal, 2–4 mm (0.079–0.157 in) long and 1–2 mm (0.039–0.079 in) wide. The callus consists of two purplish ridges. Flowering occurs from late September to November.

This donkey orchid is similar to Diuris pardina but has fewer, taller flowers and a later flowering period.

== Taxonomy and naming ==
Diuris leopardina was first formally described in 2017 by David Jones and Robert Bates in Australian Orchid Review from specimens collected near the Penola to Duradong road in 1963. The specific epithet (leopardina) means "marked like a leopard", referring to the spots on the back of the flowers and large patches on the dorsal sepal.

== Distribution and habitat ==
This species of orchid grows in open forest on the plains of south-eastern South Australia and nearby areas of Victoria.
