= Bartholina etheliae =

Conservation status
- Vulnerable (IUCN 3.1)

Scientific classification
- Kingdom: Plantae
- Clade: Tracheophytes
- Clade: Angiosperms
- Clade: Monocots
- Order: Asparagales
- Family: Orchidaceae
- Subfamily: Orchidoideae
- Genus: Bartholina
- Species: B. etheliae

Binomial name
- Bartholina etheliae Bolus

Species of flowering plant

Bartholina etheliae is a species of plant in the family Orchidaceae. It is widespread in Southern Africa from Namibia down the west coast of the Northern and Western Cape and then along the southern Cape coast as far east as Port Elizabeth. It also is found well into the Karoo.
