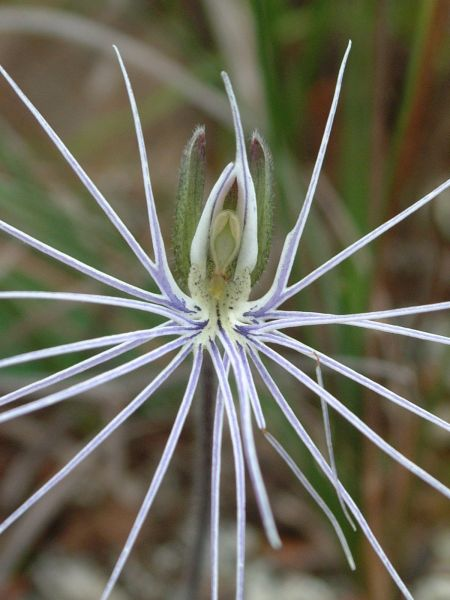
- Bartholina burmanniana

Scientific classification
- Kingdom: Plantae
- Clade: Tracheophytes
- Clade: Angiosperms
- Clade: Monocots
- Order: Asparagales
- Family: Orchidaceae
- Subfamily: Orchidoideae
- Tribe: Orchideae
- Subtribe: Orchidinae
- Genus: Bartholina; R.Br.

Type species
- Bartholina pectinata R.Br. in W.T.Aiton

= Bartholina =

Spider orchid

Genus of flowering plants

Bartholina is an orchid genus native to South Africa and Namibia.

A member of the Fynbos plant kingdom, Bartholina is also known as the "spider orchid". The common name comes from the array of long, narrow petal lobes that surround the flower, said to resemble the legs of a spider.

The genus is named after the seventeenth century Danish scientist Thomas Bartholin.

Two species are recognized:

- Bartholina burmanniana (L.) Ker Gawl. (syn, Bartholina pectinata) - Cape Province
- Bartholina etheliae Bolus - Namibia and Cape Province
