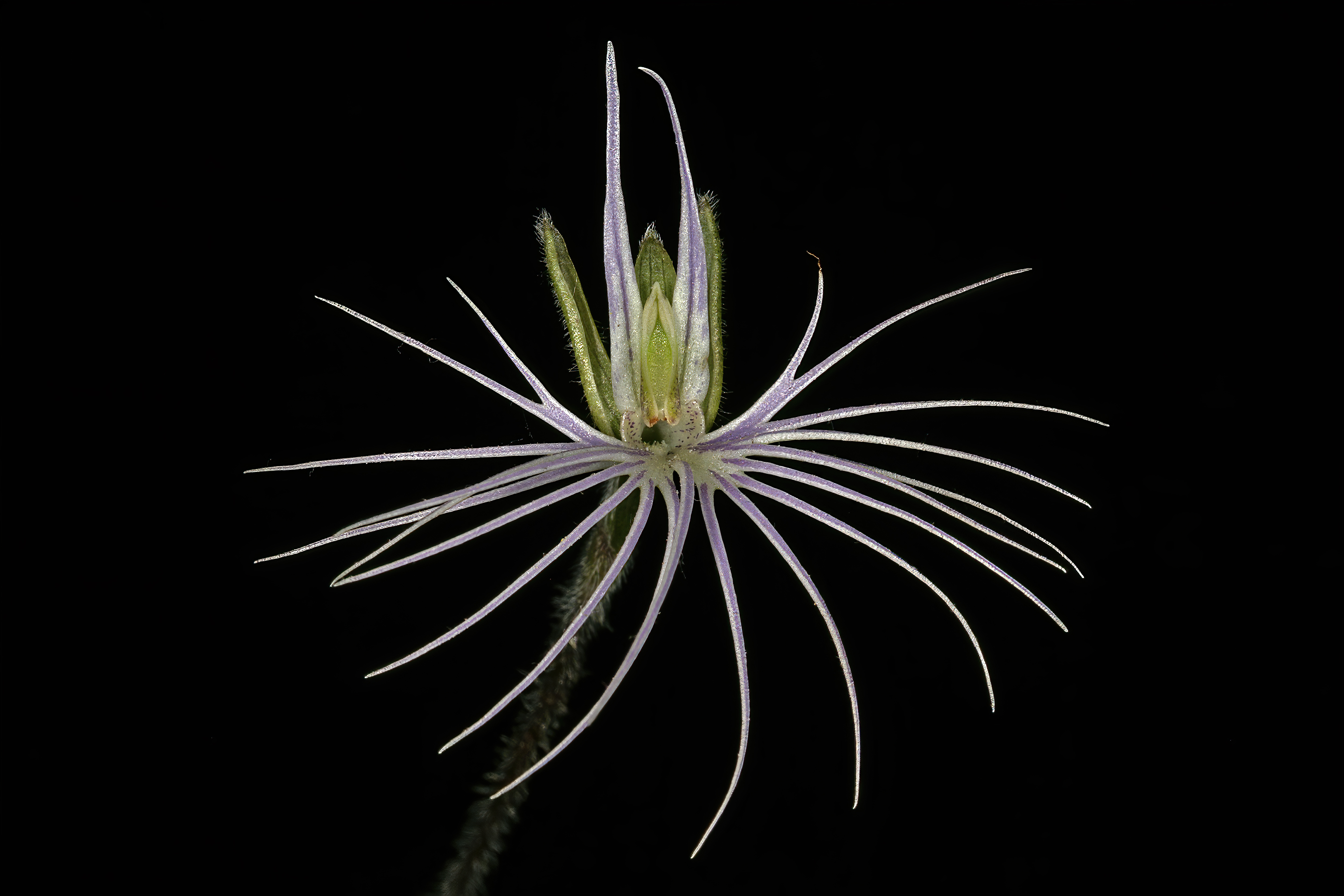

Scientific classification
- Kingdom: Plantae
- Clade: Embryophytes
- Clade: Tracheophytes
- Clade: Angiosperms
- Clade: Monocots
- Order: Asparagales
- Family: Orchidaceae
- Subfamily: Orchidoideae
- Genus: Bartholina
- Species: B. burmanniana

Binomial name
- Bartholina burmanniana (L.) Ker Gawl.

= Bartholina burmanniana =

Species of flowering plant

Bartholina burmanniana, the spider orchid, is a species of deciduous, geophytic, flowering plant in the family Orchidaceae. It is one of two species within the Bartholina genus, the other being B. etheliae. The species’ common name refers to its spreading and deeply cut lip that is said to resemble a spider's legs. It is native to the Eastern and the Western Cape Provinces of South Africa, flowering from the end of August to the middle of October and peaking in September. This is one of the species sometimes referred to as "spider orchid".

Bartholina burmanniana is rarely found in colonies, growing in small groups or singly in a variety of habitats and soil types. Mass flowering is observed after summer bush fires remove thick vegetation, creating an opportune environment for attracting pollinators. Work undertaken in 2009 has proposed the long-proboscid tabanid fly, Philoliche rostrate, to be the pollinator of this species.

== Description ==
Bartholina burmanniana was one of the earliest of the Cape orchids to be described in published works reputedly due to its unusual beauty. Bartholina is dwarf genus, with B. burmanniana reaching up to between 50-220mm tall. It is a terrestrial orchid, with a single or double root-stem tuberoid, 9-12x 5-8mm, which is replaced annually.

Bartholina burmanniana has a single, prostrate, basal leaf that is sessile to the stem. It is smooth with a dark green cordate or orbicular base 10-40 x 8-20mm with a fringe of hairs along the margins. The scape (leafless inflorescence stalk), is 35-160mm tall and slender. It is pubescent with white hairs 1-3mm and a maroon- brown, sometimes turning to green at the top. The pedicle is forward curved and around 10-15mm long.

The Inflorescence is typically single-flowered (rarely double) with a faint scent. It has green oblong-lanceolate, pubescent bracts, around 9-12mm long which are spathe-shaped and clasping. The petals are 9-19 x 2-3mm, white with a blue-mauve middle stripe. They are narrowly lanceolate and erect to slightly recurved.

A characteristic feature within the genus is the white- mauve flowers with a fan-shaped spreading lip each divided into many linear segments. This feature gives the species its common name, as it is said that the deeply cut lip resemble a spider's legs. This lip can be up to 35x30mm. Within B. burmanniana the lip segments are divided into 4-6 slender lobes between 22-32x 05.-2mm, which taper to a long tip and bend downwards. This helps to distinguish is from B. etheliae which has a lip with clavate (club-shaped) tips which are upturned. B. burmanniana has a spur, 8-13mm long and cone-shaped which extends backwards.

The lip is attached to the column at the base. The column has club-shaped anthers, up to 10mm long, held immediately in front of the petals. The rostellum, the projection on the column which separates the stigma surface from the anther, is 2mm tall. Each anther lobe has a solitary oblong, granular pollinia held on a long stalk. The stigma is minute with an ovary 10-15mm long, curved, oblong and hairy. The seed capsule is 15-20 x 4-5mm long and oblong shaped.

The greenish sepals are around 6-12mm long, linear-lanceolate and bend upwards; tapering to a long tip. They are pubescent on the margins and free, subequal and erect to suberect. The hairy sepals of B. burmanniana also helps to differentiate it from B. etheliae which has hairless sepals.

As a deciduous geophytic plant it goes dormant in the summer after flowering, dying back to the tuberoid until the next winter growing season.

== Etymology ==
The genus Bartholina was named by Robert Brown in 1813 for the Danish anatomist and physiologist Professor Thomas Bartholin (1616-1680). Bartholin is most famously known for first describing the human lymph system. The species epithet burmanniana was given by Carl Linnaeus to honour his friend Johannes Burman (1707-1779) a physician and professor of botany in Amsterdam with an early interest in the flora of the Cape.

The common names, spider orchid and spinekopblom refer to the spider-like lip of the flower.

== Habitat and ecology ==
Bartholina burmanniana is considered to be a variable species, occurring in a number of conditions and habitats throughout its range. It can be found most commonly in the fertile clay soils of the ‘renosterveld’, a Dicerothamnus rhinoceritis dominated shrubland, on stony slopes or amongst bushes and clearings. It is also found on the nutrient poor, acid sandstone soils of the lowland and montane-fynbos shrubland dominated by the Cape heathland vegetation of Agathosma and Erica. It is also found in transitional fynbos-renosterveld were these two habitats meet.

Bartholina burmanniana is rarely found in colonies, growing in small groups or singly in a variety of habitats and soil types. While not fire-dependent, mass flowering of B. burmanniana is observed after summer bush fires remove thick vegetation, creating an opportune environment for attracting pollinators.

Field work undertaken in 2009 at the Cape Peninsula by Greig Russell and Bill Liltved, has proposed the long-proboscid tabanid fly, Philoliche rostrate, to be the pollinator of this species.

== Distribution ==
Bartholina burmanniana is widely distributed throughout the Cape Floristic Region of South Africa, from Clanwilliam in Western Cape to Grahamstown in the Eastern Cape. It can be found at altitudes between sea-level up to over 2000m in the Groot-Swartberg, a mountain range in the Western Cape.

== Taxonomy and Systematics ==
Bartholina burmanniana is one of two species within the Bartholina genus, the other being B. etheliae. Heinrich Bernard Oldenland collected the species type, placing the voucher in the herbarium of Johannes Burman the Dutch botanist and physician. Burman's son Nicolaas Burman (1733–1793), arrived in Uppsala in 1760 to learn under Carl Linnaeus, bringing herbarium material from Oldenland's Cape of Good Hope collections. Linnaeus described these specimens in 1760 in the Plantae Rariores Africanae. B. burmanniana was amongst the small number of African orchids described by Linnaeus, naming the species Orchis burmanniana (L.) in Burman's honour. The species was described by Robert Brown as B. pedinata in 1813 marking the creation of the genus Bartholina. A few years later in 1818 it was given the still extant name of B. burmanniana by Ker Gawl.

Bartholina sits within the family Orchidaceae, one of the largest flowering plant families globally. The family was first divided into eight genera by Linnaeus in 1753. As orchid taxonomy opened up to new techniques in molecular phylogenetic, studies began analysing DNA sequences to establish relationships between orchid species. Current classifications place B. burmanniana within the order Asparagales, the family Orchidaceae, the subfamily Orchidoideae and the subtribe Orchidinae.

There is some debate about the relationship between Bartholina and Holothrix, another dwarf geophytic orchid genus. Both genera share an identical flower structure and a number of vegetative features. Within both Bartholina and Holothrix auricles (filament appendages) are absent. This differentiates them from all other Orchideae and Diseae. Instead their staminodes and gynostemium are homologous. As such, Kurzweil & Weber, 1991 believe that generic separation of Bartholina may not be appropriate.

== Conservation status ==
The Red List of South African plants states the National Status of Bartholina burmanniana be of ‘Least Concern’. This means that the species has been evaluated and believed to have a "low risk of extinction". This assessment was made in 2005 by Johnson and Victor according to IUCN Red List Categories and Criteria.

== Horticultural cultivation ==
Bartholina burmanniana was amongst the first cultivated plants from South Africa to be introduced and to flower in Europe. It was first brought to Royal Botanic Gardens Kew, from the Cape of Good Hope in 1787, by Francis Masson a Scottish plant-hunter and horticulturalist.

The plants mutually beneficial association with mycorrhizal fungi is the key to successful cultivation. Within Bartholina spp., the root-stem tuberoids are replaced every year, meaning that mycorrhizal associations must be renewed annually. Therefore, plants must be grown in soil from their natural region or in the presence of an appropriate mycorrhizal fungi. It is recommended that coarse sand is incorporated into the medium and placed under cover with an open aspect. Watering regimes need to mimic the conditions of the Cape, with heavy fortnightly watering that stops completely from spring throughout the summer.
