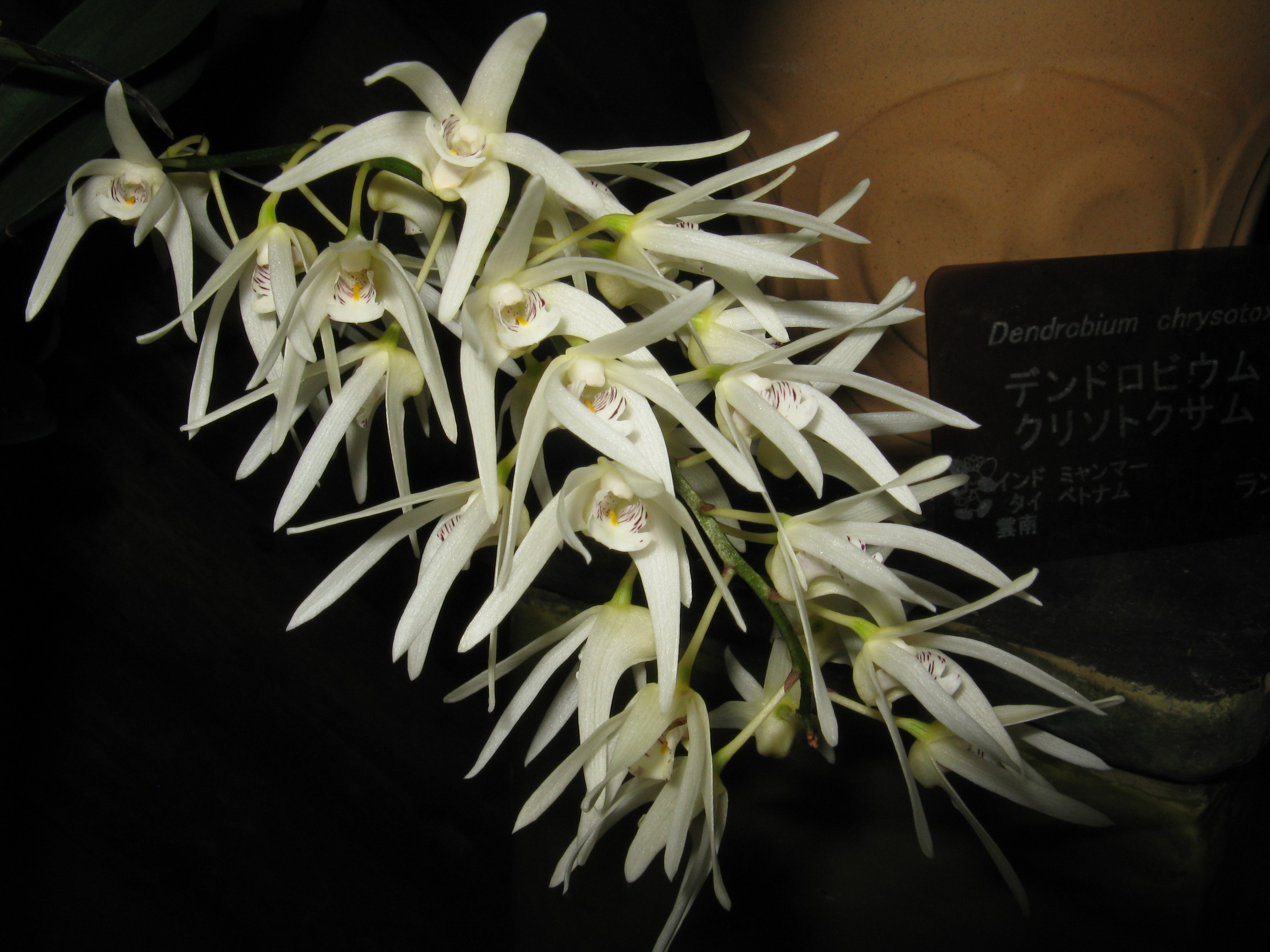
- In the Osaka Prefectural Flowers Garden

Scientific classification
- Kingdom: Plantae
- Clade: Embryophytes
- Clade: Tracheophytes
- Clade: Angiosperms
- Clade: Monocots
- Order: Asparagales
- Family: Orchidaceae
- Subfamily: Epidendroideae
- Tribe: Malaxideae
- Subtribe: Dendrobiinae
- Genus: Dendrobium
- Species: D. jonesii

Binomial name
- Dendrobium jonesii Rendle

Synonyms
- List: Dendrobium fusiforme F.M.Bailey nom. illeg.; Dendrobium fusiforme f. magnifica Dockrill; Dendrobium fusiforme var. blackburnii Nicholls; Dendrobium jonesii subsp. bancroftianium M.A.Clem. & D.L.Jones orth. var.; Dendrobium jonesii subsp. bancroftianum D.L.Jones nom. inval.; Dendrobium jonesii subsp. bancroftianum (Rchb.f.) M.A.Clem. & D.L.Jones; Dendrobium jonesii subsp. blackburnii D.L.Jones nom. inval.; Dendrobium jonesii subsp. blackburnii (Nicholls) M.A.Clem. & D.L.Jones; Dendrobium jonesii Rendle subsp. jonesii; Dendrobium jonesii subsp. magnificum (Dockrill) D.P.Banks & Clemesha; Dendrobium jonesii var. jonesii Rendle; Dendrobium jonesii var. magnificum (Dockrill) Dockrill; Dendrobium ruppianum A.D.Hawkes; Dendrobium ruppianum f. magnificum (Dockrill) Dockrill; Dendrobium ruppianum A.D.Hawkes f. ruppianum; Dendrobium ruppianum var. blackburnii (Nicholls) Dockrill; Dendrobium ruppianum A.D.Hawkes var. ruppianum; Dendrobium sp. aff. jonesii; Dendrobium speciosum f. bancroftianum (Rchb.f.) F.M.Bailey; Dendrobium speciosum var. bancroftianum Rchb.f.; Dendrobium speciosum var. fusiforme F.M.Bailey; Dendrocoryne speciosa var. fusiforme M.A.Clem. nom. inval., pro syn.; Dendrocoryne speciosum var. fusiforme Brieger nom. inval.; Thelychiton jonesii (Rendle) M.A.Clem. & D.L.Jones; Thelychiton jonesii subsp. bancroftianus (Rchb.f.) M.A.Clem. & D.L.Jones; Thelychiton jonesii subsp. blackburnii (Nicholls) M.A.Clem. & D.L.Jones; Thelychiton jonesii (Rendle) M.A.Clem. & D.L.Jones subsp. jonesii; Tropilis ruppiana (A.D.Hawkes) Butzin; Tropilis ruppiana (A.D.Hawkes) Rauschert isonym

= Dendrobium jonesii =

Oak orchid

Species of orchid

Dendrobium jonesii, commonly known as oak orchid is a species of epiphytic or lithophytic orchid endemic to far north Queensland. It has spindle-shaped pseudobulbs, up to seven thin, dark green leaves and up to thirty five crowded, star-like, fragrant cream-coloured or white flowers with purple markings on the labellum.

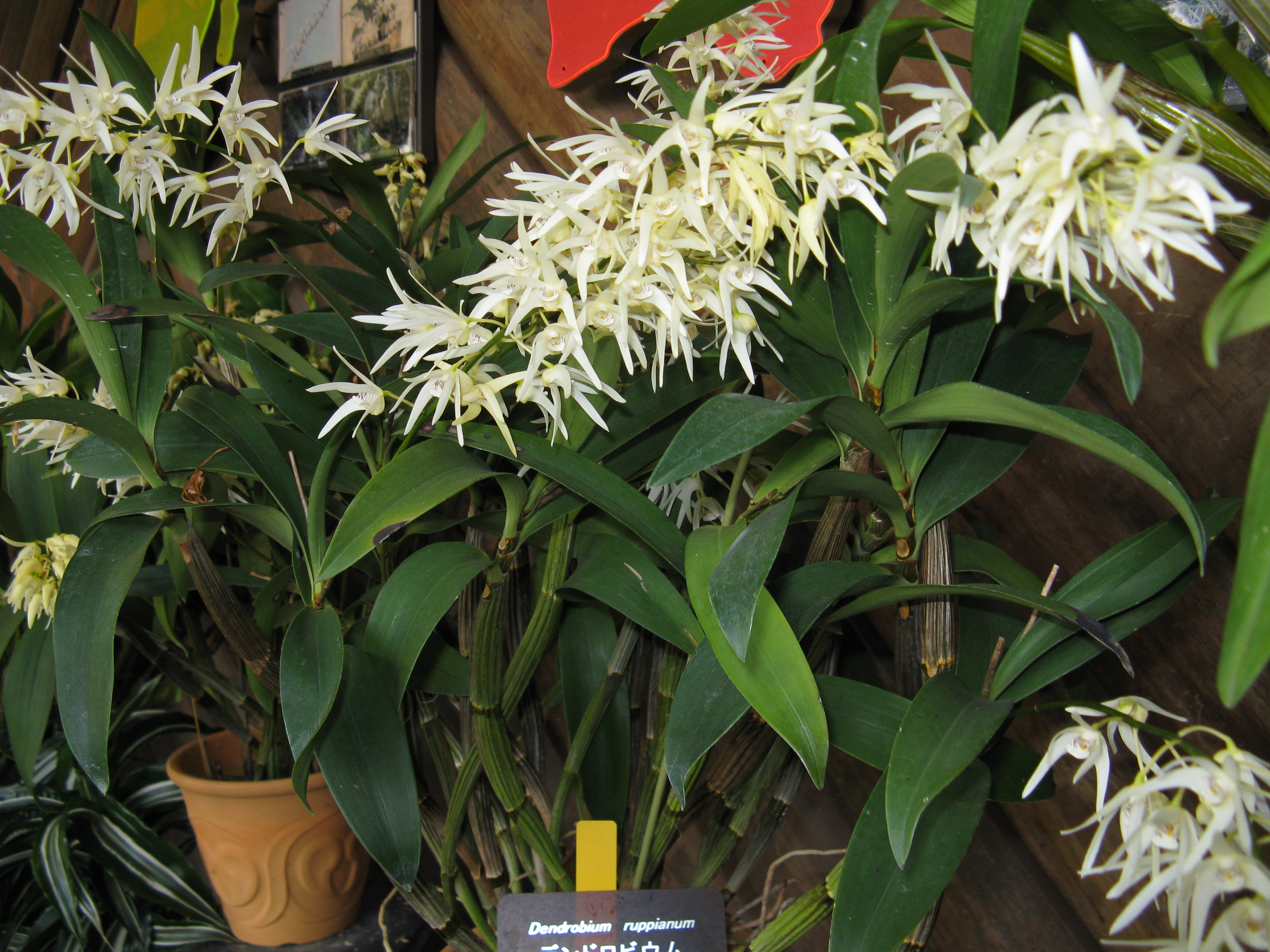
Habit (cultivated specimens)

== Description ==
Dendrobium jonesii is an epiphytic or lithophytic herb with dark brownish green pseudobulbs that are 200–500 mm (8–20 in) long, 30–40 mm (1–2 in) wide and tapered at both ends. There are between two and seven thin, leathery, dark green leaves 60–150 mm (2–6 in) long and 40–60 mm (1.6–2.4 in) wide. Between ten and thirty five cream-coloured or white resupinate flowers 16–20 mm (0.6–0.8 in) long and 20–25 mm (0.8–1 in) wide are borne on a flowering stem 200–350 mm (8–10 in) long. The sepals and petals are pointed, the sepals 16–22 mm (0.6–0.9 in) long and 2.5–4.5 mm (0.1–0.2 in) wide and the petals a similar length but narrower. The labellum is white with purple markings, about 8 mm (0.3 in) long and 7 mm (0.3 in) wide with three lobes. The side lobes are curved and the middle lobe is oblong with an orange ridge along its midline. Flowering occurs from July to November.

== Taxonomy and naming ==
Dendrobium jonesii was first formally described in 1901 by Alfred Barton Rendle from a specimen collected by "Mr. Arthur Owen Jones, J.P.". The description was published in the Journal of Botany, British and Foreign and the specific epithet (jonesii) honours the collector of the type specimen.

There are two varieties:

- Dendrobium jonesii var. jonesii;
- Dendrobium jonesii var. magnificum (Dockrill) Dockrill – the large oak orchid which has larger flowers and a later flowering period.

== Distribution and habitat ==
Oak orchid grows in rainforest and in open forest where it often grows on she-oaks (Casuarina species) between the Iron Range National Park and Paluma. The variety magnificum grow at higher altitudes in the southern part of the species' range.
