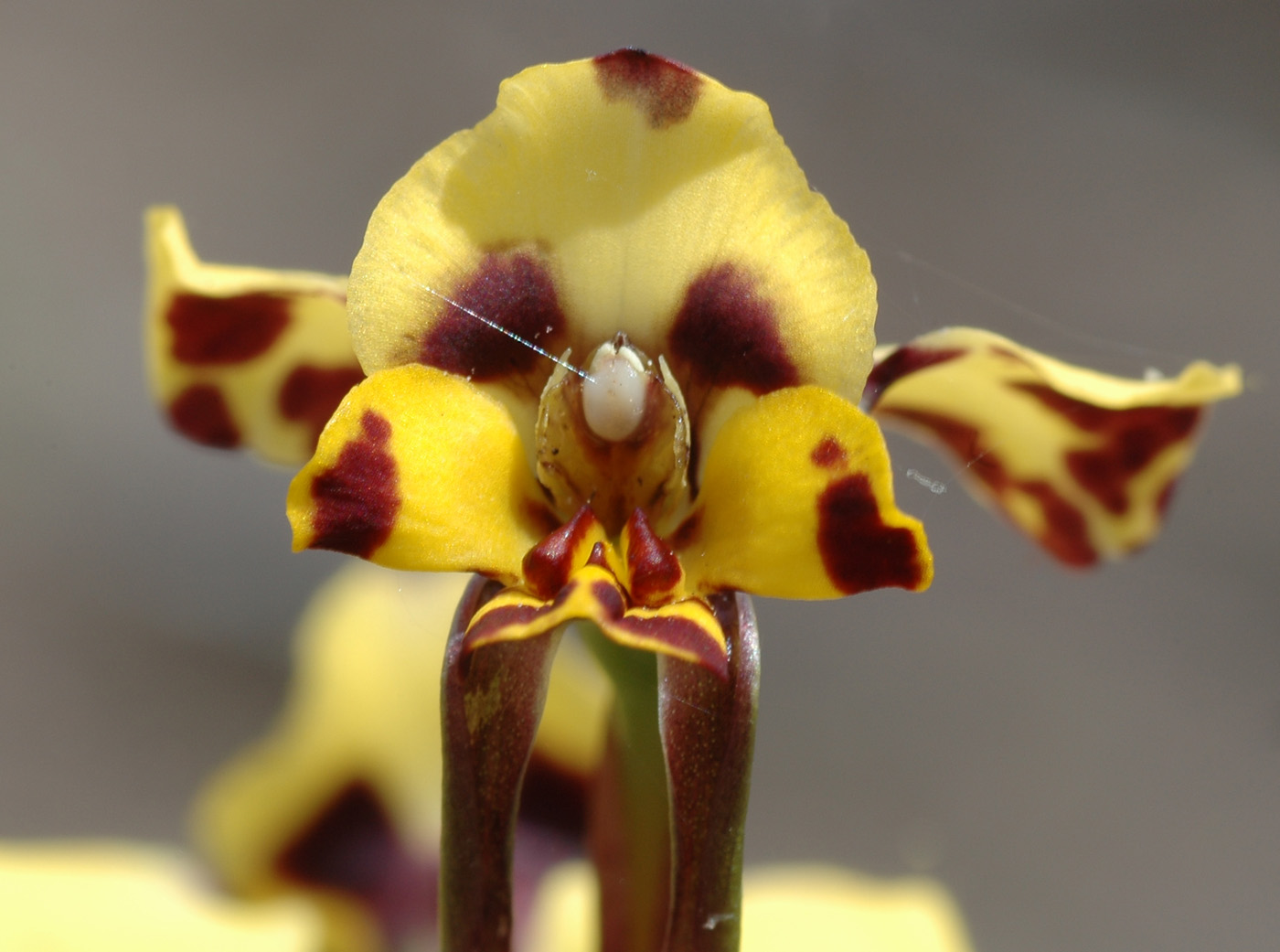
- In the southern midlands of Tasmania

Scientific classification
- Kingdom: Plantae
- Clade: Embryophytes
- Clade: Tracheophytes
- Clade: Angiosperms
- Clade: Monocots
- Order: Asparagales
- Family: Orchidaceae
- Subfamily: Orchidoideae
- Tribe: Diurideae
- Genus: Diuris
- Species: D. pardina

Binomial name
- Diuris pardina Lindl.

= Diuris pardina =

Leopard orchid

Species of orchid

Diuris pardina, commonly known as the leopard orchid or leopard doubletail is a species of orchid which is endemic to south-eastern Australia. It has two or three grass-like leaves and up to ten yellow flowers with reddish-brown marks and blotches.

== Description ==
Diuris pardina is a tuberous, perennial herb with two or three linear leaves 100–300 mm (4–10 in) long, 4–6 mm (0.2–0.2 in) wide and folded lengthwise. Between two and ten flowers 20–35 mm (0.8–1 in) wide are borne on a flowering stem 140–300 mm (6–10 in) tall. The flowers are yellow and heavily blotched with dark reddish-brown. The dorsal sepal is erect, 8–11 mm (0.3–0.4 in) long and 6–8 mm (0.2–0.3 in) wide. The lateral sepals are linear to lance-shaped, 14–16 mm (0.55–0.63 in) long, 2–3 mm (0.08–0.1 in) wide, turned downwards and usually strongly crossed. The petals are erect to curved backwards, with an egg-shaped blade 9–12 mm (0.4–0.5 in) long and 6–8 mm (0.2–0.3 in) wide on a reddish-brown stalk 4–7 mm (0.2–0.3 in) long. The labellum is 9–12 mm (0.4–0.5 in) long and has three lobes. The centre lobe is wedge-shaped, 7–9 mm (0.3–0.4 in) long and wide and the side lobes are oval, 4–6 mm (0.16–0.24 in) long and about 2 mm (0.08 in) wide. There are two raised, fleshy calli 4–5 mm (0.16–0.20 in) long in the mid-line of the labellum. Flowering occurs from August to October.

== Taxonomy and naming ==
Diuris pardina was first formally described in 1840 by John Lindley and the description was published in his book, The Genera and Species of Orchidaceous Plants. The specific epithet (pardina) is derived from the Ancient Greek word pardos meaning "leopard".

== Distribution and habitat ==
The leopard orchid is found in New South Wales, the Australian Capital Territory, Victoria, South Australia and Tasmania. It grows in well-drained soils in heath and forest and there is considerable variation in the colouration of the flowers. In New South Wales in occurs south from Mudgee and in Victoria it is widespread and common in the southern half of the state.

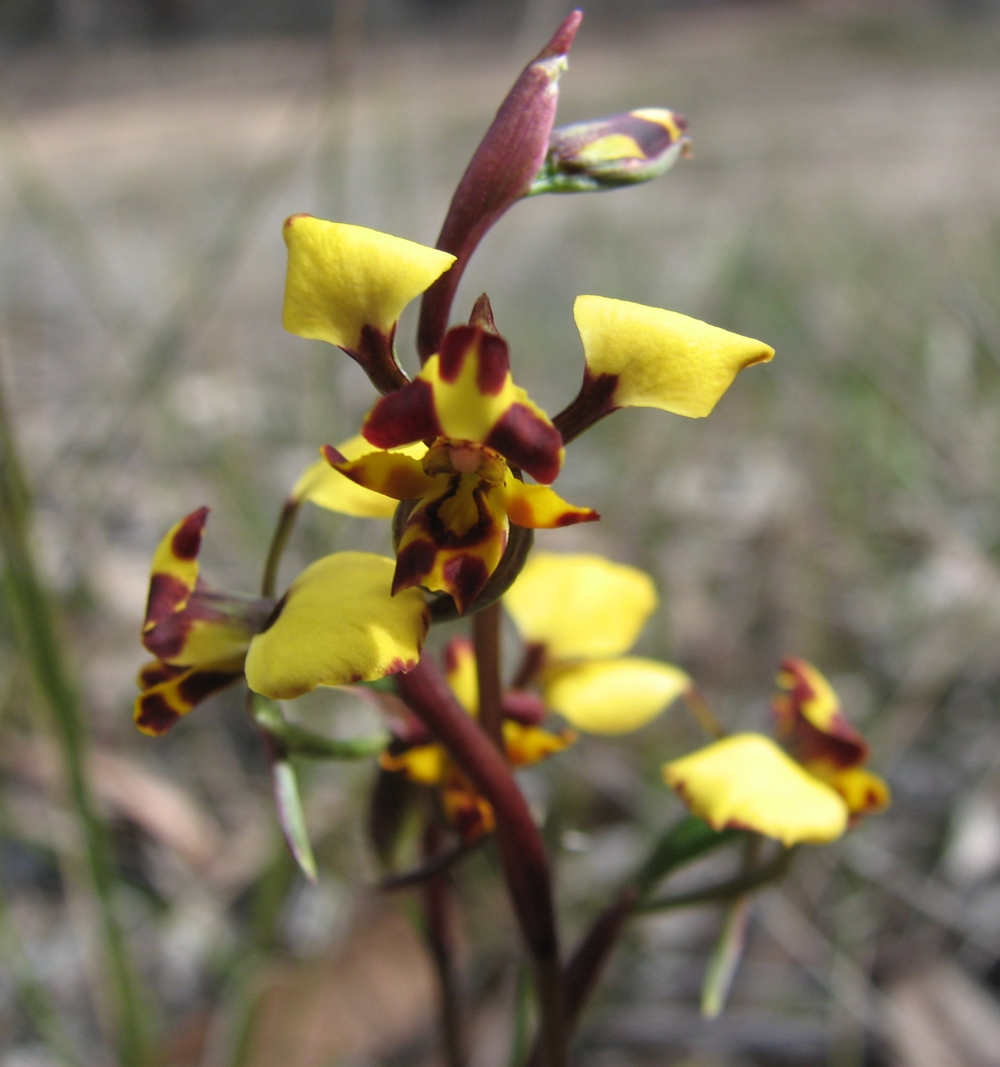
Diuris pardina at Paddys Ranges State Park

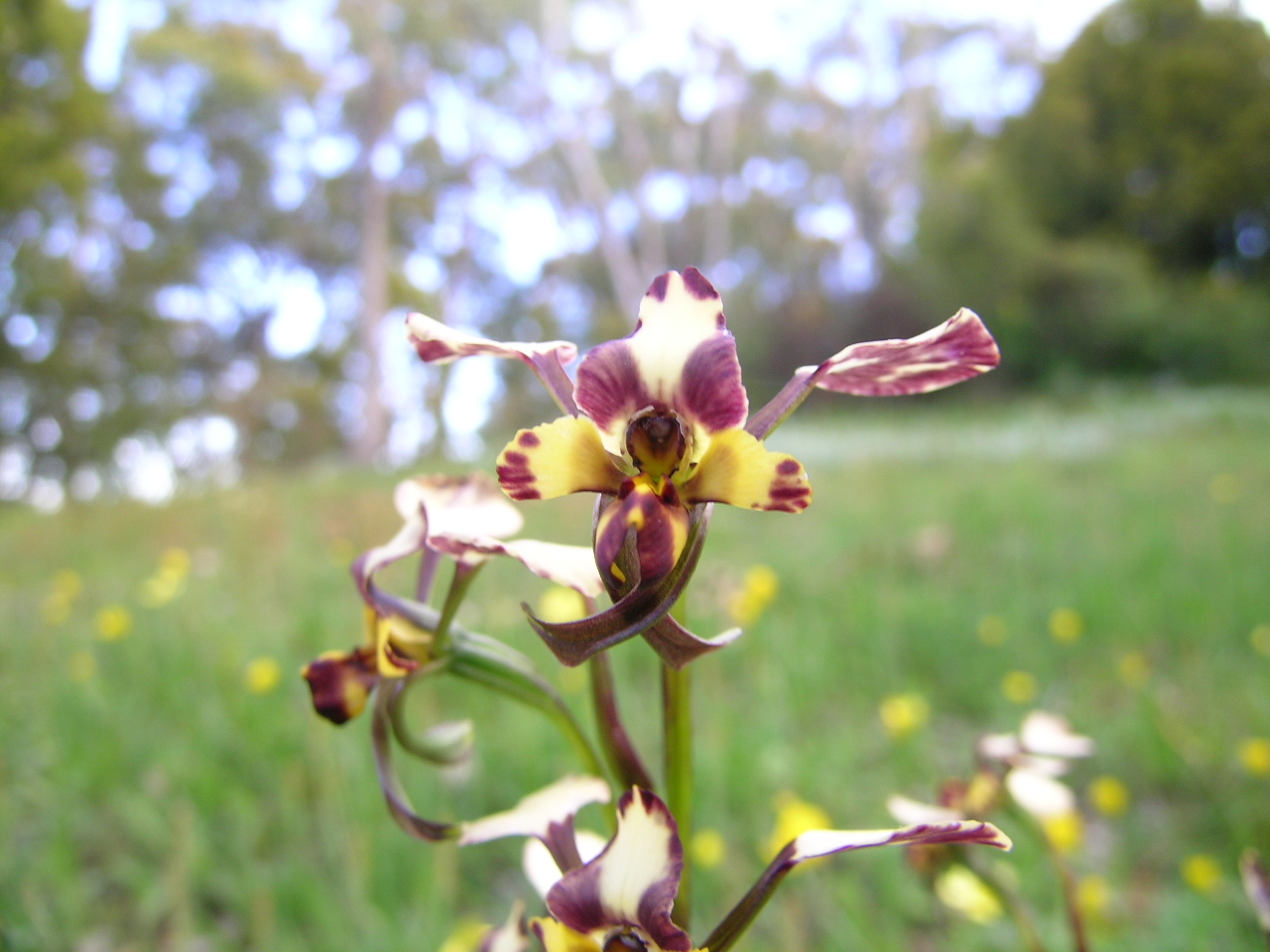
Diuris pardina in the Adelaide Hills

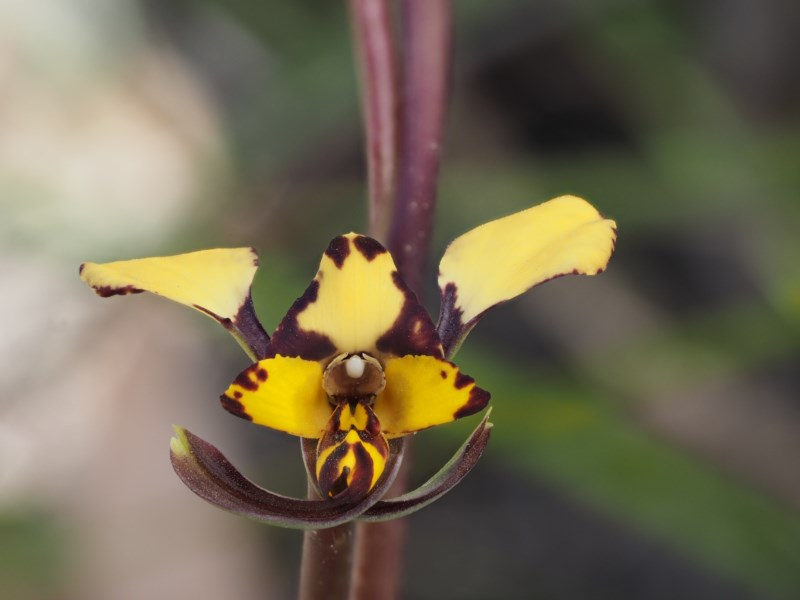
Diuris pardina in the Namadgi National Park in the A.C.T.
