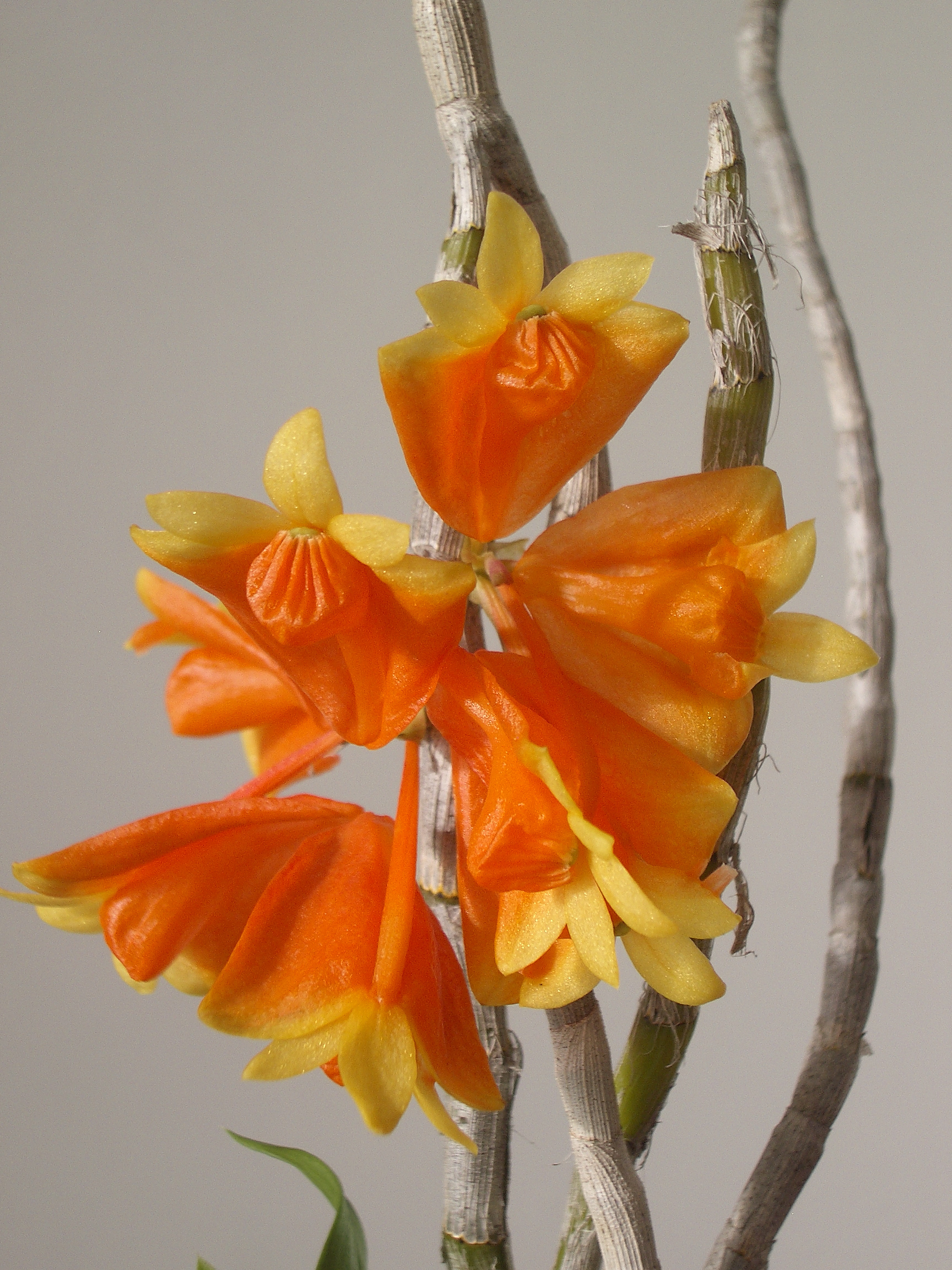
- Dendrobium wentianum

Scientific classification
- Kingdom: Plantae
- Clade: Tracheophytes
- Clade: Angiosperms
- Clade: Monocots
- Order: Asparagales
- Family: Orchidaceae
- Subfamily: Epidendroideae
- Genus: Dendrobium
- Section: Dendrobium sect. Calyptrochilus; Schlechter 1905

Type species
- Dendrobium lawesii

Species
- See text

Synonyms
- List: Chromatotrichum M A Clem & D L Jones 2002; Coelandria Fitzg. 1882; Maccraithea M A Clem & D L Jones 2002; Oxyglossum M A Clem & D L Jones 2002; Dendrobium sect. Capitata Kraenzl 1910; Dendrobium sect. Cuthbertsonia Schlechter 1912; Dendrobium sect. Dolichocentrum Schltr. 1912; Dendrobium sect. Eudendrobium subsect. Pycnostachyae Benth & Hook.f. 1883; Dendrobium sect. Glomerata Kraenzl. 1910; Dendrobium sect. Glomerata subsect. Mesocentra Kraenzl. 1910; Dendrobium sect. Oxyglossum Schlechter 1905; Pedilonum sect. Calyoptrochilus [Schlechter] Brieger 1981; Pedilonum sect. Cuthbertsonia [Schltr] Broieger 1981; Pedilonum sect. Oxyglossum [Schltr] Brieger 1981

= Dendrobium sect. Calyptrochilus =

Subgenus of flowering plants

Dendrobium section Calyptrochilus is a section of the genus Dendrobium.

== Description ==
Plants in this section have short pseudobulbs with lanceolate leaves.

== Distribution ==
Plants from this section are found from Southeast Asia to Australia and New Guinea.

== Species ==
Dendrobium section Calyptrochilus comprises the following species:

Image	Name	Distribution	Elevation (m)
	Dendrobium aemulum R. Brown 1810	New South Wales and Queensland Australia	30–1,300 metres (98–4,265 ft)
	Dendrobium alaticaulinum P. Royen 1979	Papua and New Guinea	2,750–3,200 metres (9,020–10,500 ft)
	Dendrobium apertum Schltr.1912	New Guinea	1,400 metres (4,600 ft)
	Dendrobium aurantiroseum P. Royen ex T.M. Reeve 1982	New Guinea	2,100–2,560 metres (6,890–8,400 ft)
	Dendrobium azureum Schuiteman 2013	Indonesia (Waigeo Island)	800 metres (2,600 ft)
	Dendrobium baeuerlenii F.Muell. & Kraenzl. 1894	New Guinea	80 metres (260 ft)
	Dendrobium bracteosum Rchb. f. 1886	Papua and New Guinea, the Bismarck archipelago and the Moluccas	0–700 metres (0–2,297 ft)
	Dendrobium brassii T.M.Reeve & P.Woods 1989	Papua New Guinea	1,500–2,200 metres (4,900–7,200 ft)
	Dendrobium brevicaule Rolfe 1899	New Guinea	2,900–4,000 metres (9,500–13,100 ft)
	Dendrobium brevilabium Schltr. 1912	New Guinea	1,200 metres (3,900 ft)
	Dendrobium caliculimentum R.S. Rogers 1925	New Guinea, Sulawesi and the Solomon Islands	800–2,500 metres (2,600–8,200 ft)
	Dendrobium callitrophilum B.Gray & D.L.Jones 1989	Australia	760–1,500 metres (2,490–4,920 ft)
	Dendrobium capituliflorum Rolfe 1901	Papua New Guinea and the Solomon Islands	0–1,800 metres (0–5,906 ft)
	Dendrobium centrosepalum Schuit., Juswara & Droissart 2016	New Guinea	1,114 metres (3,655 ft)
	Dendrobium chrysopterum Schuit. & de Vogel 2001	eastern New Guinea	800 metres (2,600 ft)
	Dendrobium cochleatum J.J.Sm. 1908	western New Guinea	800–1,000 metres (2,600–3,300 ft)
	Dendrobium convexipes J.J.Sm. 1929	New Guinea	2,000–2,400 metres (6,600–7,900 ft)
	Dendrobium crenatifolium J.J.Sm. 1911	western New Guinea	2,800–3,450 metres (9,190–11,320 ft)
	Dendrobium cuculliferum J.J.Sm. 1913	New Guinea	1,400–1,800 metres (4,600–5,900 ft)
	Dendrobium cuthbertsonii F. Mueller 1888	New Guinea	750–3,500 metres (2,460–11,480 ft)
	Dendrobium cyanocentrum Schltr. 1906	New Guinea	100–1,600 metres (330–5,250 ft)
	Dendrobium dekockii J.J.Sm. 1911	New Guinea	2,300–3,800 metres (7,500–12,500 ft)
	Dendrobium dichroma Schlechter 1912	New Guinea	1,500–2,000 metres (4,900–6,600 ft)
	Dendrobium dillonianum A.D.Hawkes & A.H.Heller 1957	New Guinea	1,140 metres (3,740 ft)
	Dendrobium erosum (Blume) Lindl. 1830	southern Thailand, Malaysia, Sumatra, Java, Sulawesi, Papua & New Guinea, Vanuatu, and the Solomon Islands	500–2,000 metres (1,600–6,600 ft)
	Dendrobium glomeratum H.J.Veitch ex Rob 1893	Moluccas Islands	1,200 metres (3,900 ft)
	Dendrobium habbemense P.Royen 1979	New Guinea	2,100–3,500 metres (6,900–11,500 ft)
	Dendrobium hasseltii (Blume) Lindl. 1830	peninsular Malaysia, Java and Sumatra	1,500–3,000 metres (4,900–9,800 ft)
	Dendrobium hellwigianum Kraenzl. ex Warb. 1893	Papua & New Guinea	1,400–2,700 metres (4,600–8,900 ft)
	Dendrobium laevifolium Stapf 1924	New Guinea, Solomon Islands, Santa Cruz Islands and Vanuatu	650–2,400 metres (2,130–7,870 ft)
	Dendrobium lancifolium A. Rich. 1834	Indonesia and New Guinea	70–1,900 metres (230–6,230 ft)
	Dendrobium lawesii F. Mueller 1884	Papua and New Guinea and Bougainville Island	800–2,000 metres (2,600–6,600 ft)
	Dendrobium loesenerianum Schltr. 1912	New Guinea	1,000 metres (3,300 ft)
	Dendrobium macrogenion Schltr. 1912	New Guinea	1,200 metres (3,900 ft)
	Dendrobium masarangense Schltr. 1911	New Guinea, the Bismark Archipelago, Sulawesi, the Solomon Islands, New Caledonia, Vanuatu and Fiji	300–1,200 metres (980–3,940 ft)
	Dendrobium melinanthum Schltr. 1912	New Guinea	1,200 metres (3,900 ft)
	Dendrobium mohlianum Rchb.f 1862	Solomon Islands, Fiji, Samoa and Vanuatu	450–3,100 metres (1,480–10,170 ft)
	Dendrobium morrisonii Schltr. 1906	Vanuatu	250–900 metres (820–2,950 ft)
	Dendrobium nardoides Schltr. 1912	New Guinea	1,200–3,200 metres (3,900–10,500 ft)
	Dendrobium nebularum Schltr. 1912	Moluccas, The Philippines and New Guinea	1,400–2,800 metres (4,600–9,200 ft)
	Dendrobium nubigenum Schltr. 1912	New Guinea	2,300 metres (7,500 ft)
	Dendrobium oreodoxa Schltr. 1912	New Guinea	2,000 metres (6,600 ft)
	Dendrobium parvulum Rolfe 1899	Sulawesi, Celebes and Papua New Guinea	600–2,600 metres (2,000–8,500 ft)
	Dendrobium pentapterum Schlechter 1906	Papua and New Guinea and the Philippines	500–2,000 metres (1,600–6,600 ft)
	Dendrobium petiolatum Schltr. 1912	New Guinea	800–2,400 metres (2,600–7,900 ft)
	Dendrobium prasinum Lindl. 1859	Fiji	600–1,150 metres (1,970–3,770 ft)
	Dendrobium puniceum Ridl. 1886	New Guinea, the Bismark Archipelago and the Solomon Islands	1,100–1,200 metres (3,600–3,900 ft)
	Dendrobium purpureum Roxb. 1820	Moluccas, New Guinea, the Caroline Islands, Fiji and Vanuatu	0–1,150 metres (0–3,773 ft)
	Dendrobium rupestre J.J.Sm. 1911	New Guinea	1,500–3,100 metres (4,900–10,200 ft)
	Dendrobium rutriferum Rchb.f. 1887	New Guinea and The Solomon Islands	600 metres (2,000 ft)
	Dendrobium seranicum J.J. Sm. 1928	Molucca Islands	1,000–1,900 metres (3,300–6,200 ft)
	Dendrobium smilliae F. Muell. 1867	Queensland and Papua New Guinea	600 metres (2,000 ft)
	Dendrobium spiculatum Schuit. 2017	Western New Guinea	1,970 metres (6,460 ft)
	Dendrobium subacaule Reinw. ex Lindl. 1859	Moluccas, New Guinea and the Solomon Islands	1,700–2,500 metres (5,600–8,200 ft)
	Dendrobium subclausum Rolfe 1894	northern Papua and New Guinea and the Molucca Islands	2,000 metres (6,600 ft)
	Dendrobium subuliferum J.J. Sm. 1911	Papua and New Guinea	300–2,000 metres (980–6,560 ft)
	Dendrobium sulphureum Schltr. 1912	New Guinea	1,800–3,600 metres (5,900–11,800 ft)
	Dendrobium tinukariensis Sulist. & P.O'Byrne 2017	Sulawesi, Indonesia	
	Dendrobium trichostomum Rchb.f. ex Oliv. 1875	New Guinea	500–900 metres (1,600–3,000 ft)
	Dendrobium vannouhuysii J.J.Sm 1911	New Guinea	2,100–3,250 metres (6,890–10,660 ft)
	Dendrobium vexillarius J.J.Smith 1910	New Guinea, New Ireland and the Moluccas	1,100–3,500 metres (3,600–11,500 ft)
	Dendrobium violaceum Kraenzl. 1910	New Guinea	750–2,000 metres (2,460–6,560 ft)
	Dendrobium wentianum J.J. Sm. 1911	New Guinea	1,850–3,300 metres (6,070–10,830 ft)
