= Dendrobium crassum =

Scientific classification
- Kingdom: Plantae
- Clade: Embryophytes
- Clade: Tracheophytes
- Clade: Spermatophytes
- Clade: Angiosperms
- Clade: Monocots
- Order: Asparagales
- Family: Orchidaceae
- Subfamily: Epidendroideae
- Genus: Dendrobium
- Species: D. crassum

Binomial name
- Dendrobium crassum R.Br.

Synonyms
- List: Callista aemula (R.Br.) Kuntze; Dendrobium aemulum "ironbark" form; Dendrobium aemulum Brush Box form; Dendrobium aemulum Ironbark form; Dendrobium aemulum Rainforest form; Dendrobium aemulum brush-box form; Dendrobium aemulum R.Br. var. aemulum; Dendrobium angustum (D.L.Jones & M.A.Clem.) J.M.H.Shaw; Dendrobium crassum (D.L.Jones & M.A.Clem.) J.M.H.Shaw; Dendrobium deuteroeburneum J.M.H.Shaw; Dendrobium eungellense (D.L.Jones & M.A.Clem.) J.M.H.Shaw; Dendrobium eungellensis J.M.H.Shaw orth. var.; Dendrobium radiatum (D.L.Jones & M.A.Clem.) J.M.H.Shaw; Dendrocoryne aemulum Brieger nom. inval.; Tropilis aemula (R.Br.) Raf.; Tropilis angusta D.L.Jones & M.A.Clem.; Tropilis crassa D.L.Jones & M.A.Clem.; Tropilis eburnea D.L.Jones & M.A.Clem.; Tropilis emulum Raf. orth. var.; Tropilis eungellensis D.L.Jones & M.A.Clem.; Tropilis radiata D.L.Jones & M.A.Clem.

Species of orchid

Dendrobium crassum is now a synonym of Dendrobium aemulum, according to the Australian Plant Census and Plants of the World Online.
