= Burgeff =

Burgeff is a surname. Notable people with the surname include:

- Hans Edmund Nicola Burgeff (1883–1976), German botanist, father of Hans Karl
- Hans Karl Burgeff (1928–2005), German sculptor
