= Stefan Kaiser =

Stefan Kaiser may refer to:

- Stefan Kaiser (ski jumper), Austrian ski jumper
- Stefan Kaiser (sculptor), German sculptor
- Stefan Kaiser (volleyball), German volleyball player
