= Stefan Kaiser (sculptor) =

German sculptor (born 1956)

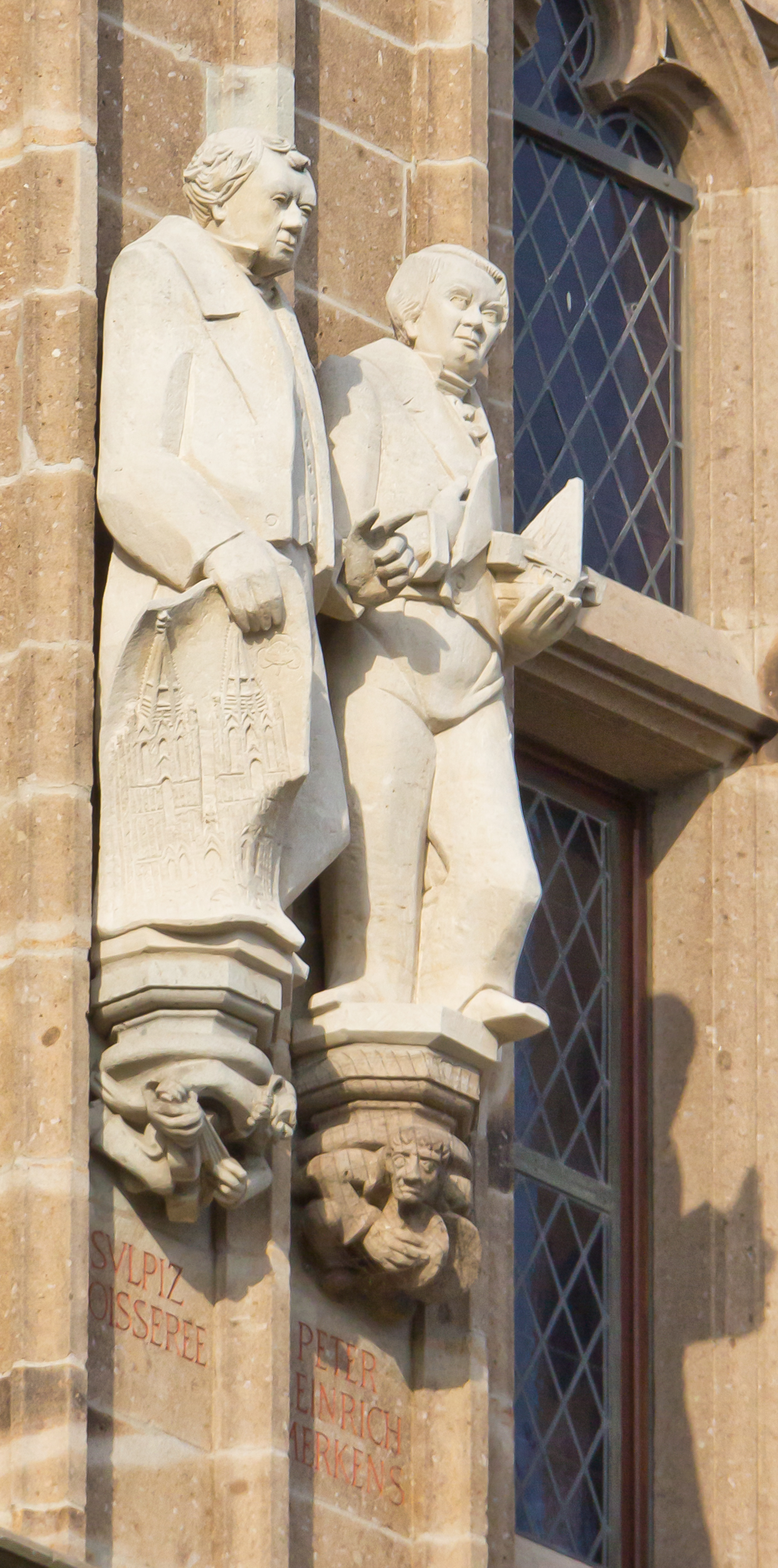
Cologne council tower figures Sulpiz Boisserée and Peter Heinrich Merkens

Stefan Kaiser (born March 3, 1956, in Cologne, Germany) is a German sculptor.

== Artistic career ==
After finishing school, Kaiser began an apprenticeship as a stonemason and stone sculptor at the Dombauhütte affiliated to Cologne Cathedral in 1974. Subsequently, from 1977 to 1978 he was a freelancer and student of the sculptor Elmar Hillebrand (1925–2016). After obtaining his technical college entrance qualification, he began his studies at the Technical University of Cologne in 1980 in the sculpture class of Hans Karl Burgeff, which he completed in 1985. Kaiser began to exhibit his works during his studies and accepted commissions from churches and private clients. Since 1978, he has been a freelance artist in his own studio and sculpture garden in the south of Cologne. Since 2020, there has been a publicly accessible sculpture trail by the artist in Cologne-Rodenkirchen.

== Work ==
Kaiser calls his characteristic work "Architektonische Plastik" (Architectural Sculpture), which comprises his sculptural examination of the "interweaving of the horizontal and the vertical with the penetration of spatial bodies". He works with classical sculptural materials such as tuff stone, sandstone, shell limestone, Savonnier limestone, terracotta, plaster and bronze. His bronze sculptures are made using the bronze casting technique developed by Elmar Hillebrand. Kaiser's work is also characterized by its figurative sculpture, as it is used in sacral contexts, exemplified in the churches of St. George's in Köln-Weiß (Cologne) and St. Maternus' and St. Joseph's in Köln-Rodenkirchen (Cologne). Kaiser made four of the 106 Cologne Council Tower figures, which show Sulpiz Boisserée (1784–1854), Georg Simon Ohm (1784–1854), Peter Heinrich Merkens (1777–1854) and Rupert von Deutz (c. 1065–1129).

== Publicly accessible works ==
=== Sculpture Trail: Kaiser-Skulpturen ===
- Various publicly accessible works in the Rodenkirchen district of Cologne

=== Commissioned works by churches ===
- Niche relief "Escape to Egypt" in St. George's in Cologne-Weiß
- Statue of Rochus in St. Rochus' in Bickendorf
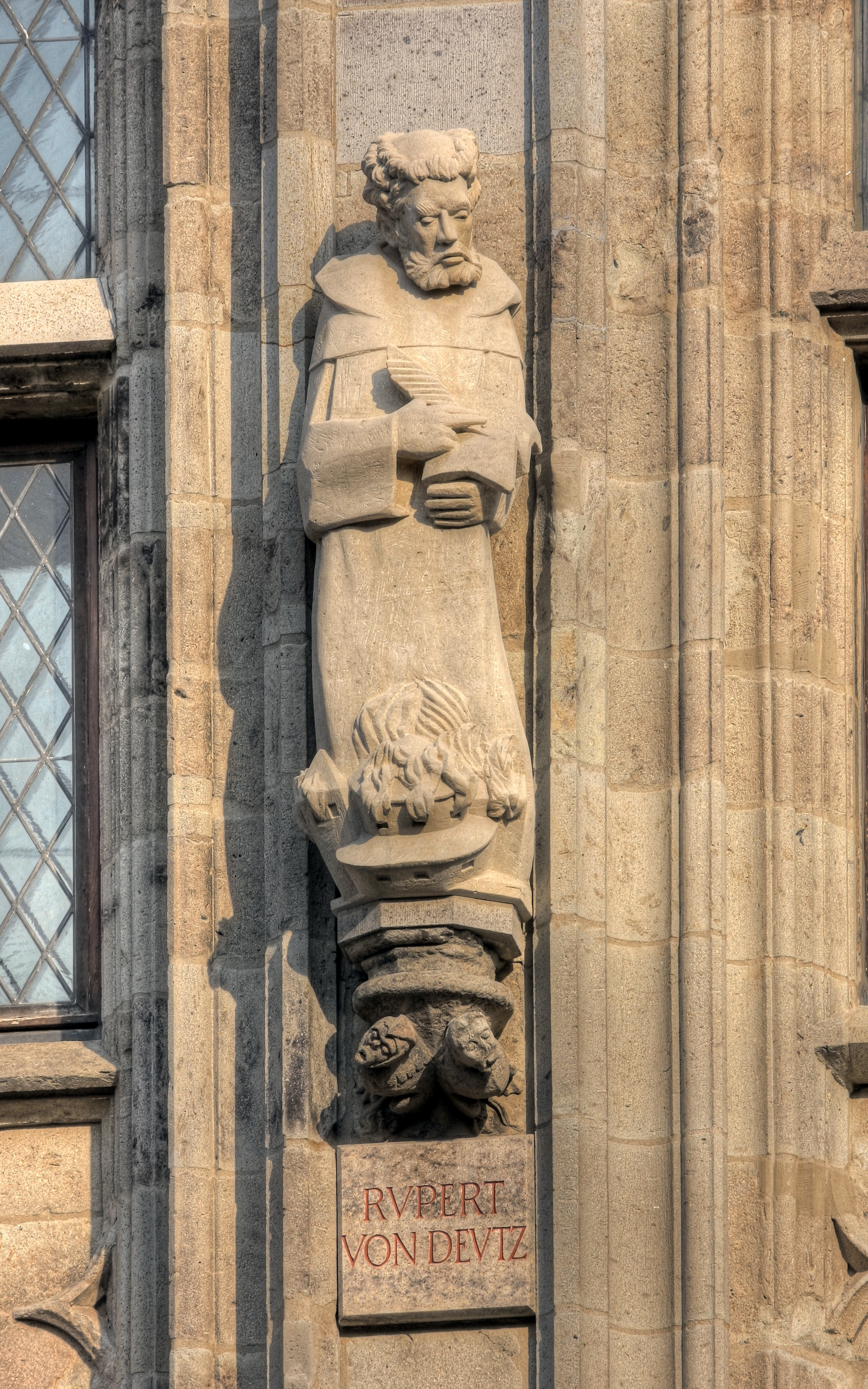
  Cologne council tower figure Rupert von Deutz
- Statue of Joseph in St. Joseph's in Cologne-Rodenkirchen
- Baptismal font (stele and bronze lid) in Old St. Maternus' in Cologne-Rodenkirchen
- Maternus statue on the choir facade of Old St. Maternus' in Cologne-Rodenkirchen
- Nativity figures of the Three Wise Men in St. Maternus' in Cologne-Rodenkrichen
- Christusambo in St. Maria Queen in Frankenforst
- Statue of St. Nicholas in the Abbey of St. Nicholas' in Brauweiler
- Statues Erpho and Kuno on the northern facade of the Abbey of St. Michael's in Siegburg
- Statue of Edith Stein in the Abbey of St. Michael's in Siegburg
- Memorial plaque for Sulpiz Boisserée in Cologne Cathedral

=== Commissioned works by Cologne ===
- Council tower figure of Sulpiz Boisserée for the tower of the Cologne Town Hall
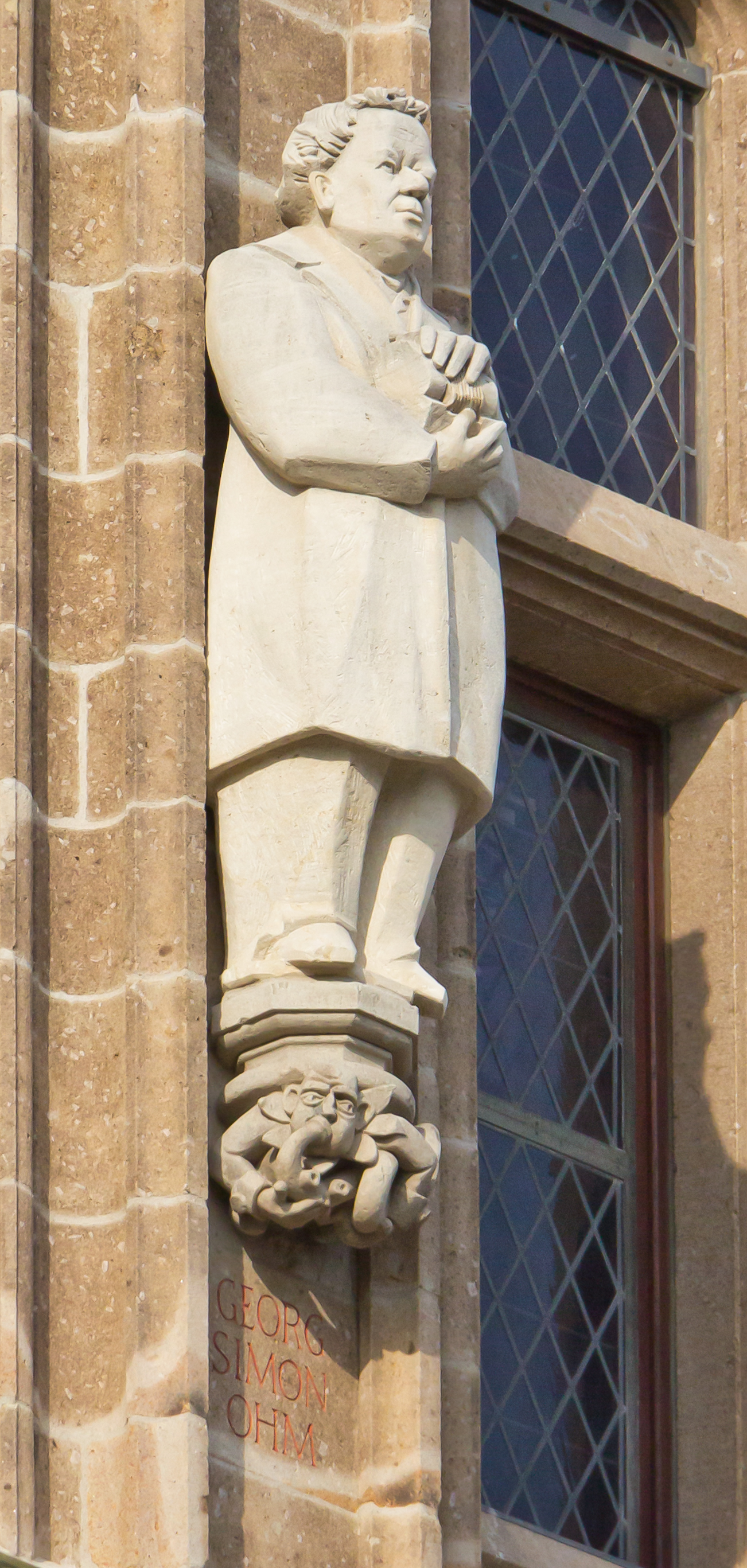
- Cologne council tower figure Georg Simon Ohm
  Council tower figure by Georg Simon Ohm for the tower of the Cologne City Hall
- Council tower figure by Peter Heinrich Merkens for the tower of the Cologne Town Hall
- Council tower figure by Rupert von Deutz for the tower of the Cologne Town Hall

=== Public works ===
- Pomegranate of the memorial "This Pain Affects Us All" by the initiative "Völkermord Erinnern" (Remembering Genocide) on the Hohenzollern Bridge in Cologne
- Sculpture "Throne" in the Forest Botanical Garden, Cologne
- Monument to Johann Christoph Winters, Melaten Cemetery, Cologne
- Monument to Hermann Josef Berk, Melaten Cemetery, Cologne
- Statue of David, Lichthof in the Caritas old people's centre St. Maternus', Cologne-Rodenkirchen
- Architectural sculpture, atrium in the Caritas old people's centre St. Maternus', Cologne-Rodenkirchen
