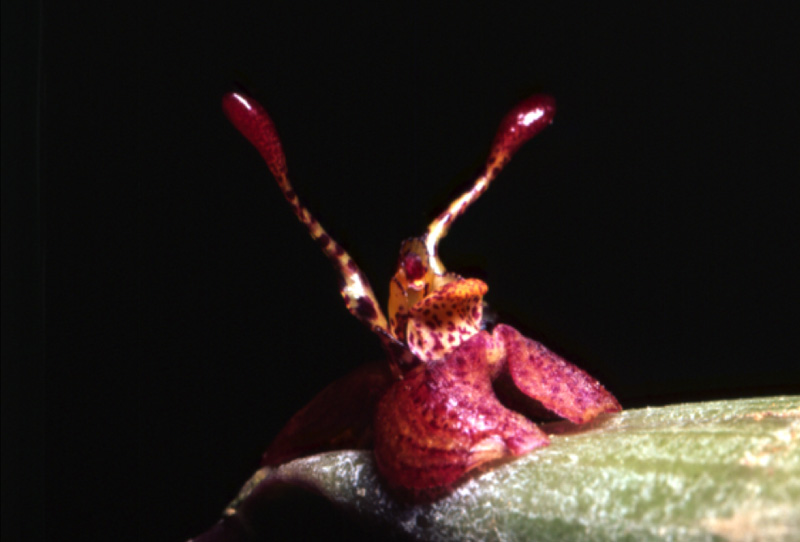

Scientific classification
- Kingdom: Plantae
- Clade: Tracheophytes
- Clade: Angiosperms
- Clade: Monocots
- Order: Asparagales
- Family: Orchidaceae
- Subfamily: Epidendroideae
- Genus: Myoxanthus
- Species: M. reymondii

Binomial name
- Myoxanthus reymondii (H.Karst.) Luer

Synonyms
- Duboisia reymondii H.Karst. (basionym); Dubois-reymondia palpigera H.Karst.; Pleurothallis reymondii(H.Karst.) Rchb.f.; Humboldtia reymondii (H.Karst.) Kuntze; Pleurothallis palpigera (H.Karst.) Schltr.; Dubois-Reymondia reymondii (H.Karst.) Brieger

= Myoxanthus reymondii =

Species of orchid

Myoxanthus reymondii is a species of flowering plant in the family Orchidaceae. It is native to Colombia, Ecuador, and Venezuela.
