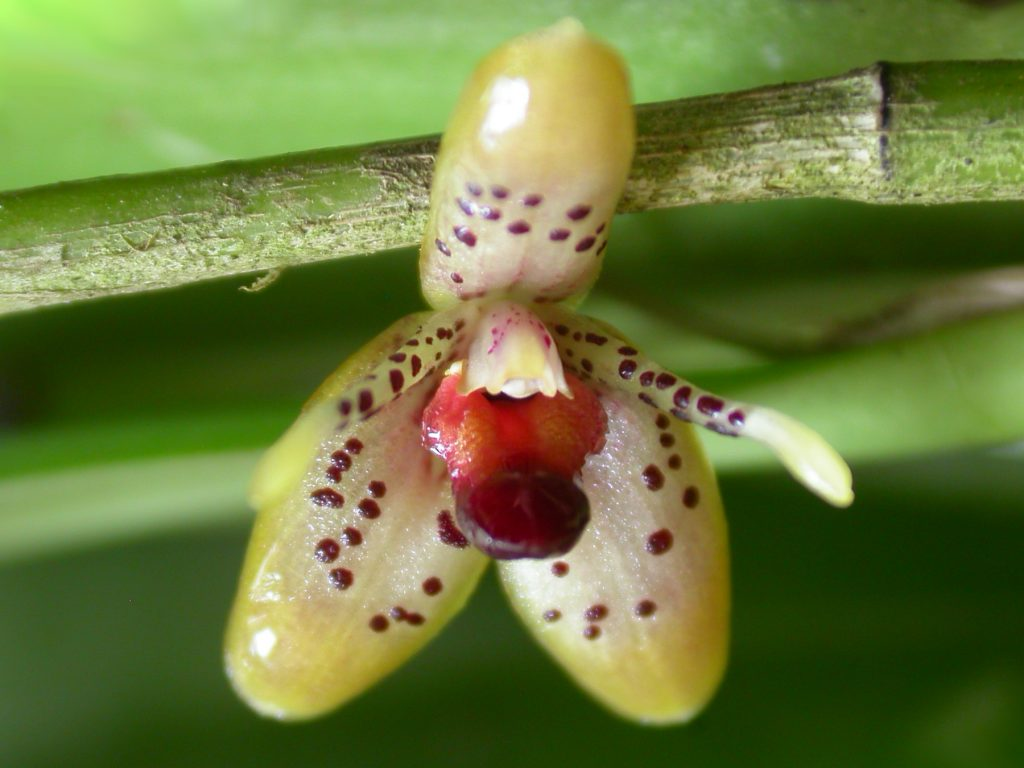

Scientific classification
- Kingdom: Plantae
- Clade: Tracheophytes
- Clade: Angiosperms
- Clade: Monocots
- Order: Asparagales
- Family: Orchidaceae
- Subfamily: Epidendroideae
- Tribe: Epidendreae
- Subtribe: Pleurothallidinae
- Genus: Myoxanthus
- Species: M. punctatus

Binomial name
- Myoxanthus punctatus (Barb.Rodr.) Luer

Synonyms
- Chaetocephala punctata Barb.Rodr. (basionym); Dubois-reymondia punctata (Barb.Rodr.) Brieger; Myoxanthus seidelii (Pabst) Luer; Pleurothallis chaetocephala Cogn.; Pleurothallis seidelii Pabst

= Myoxanthus punctatus =

Species of orchid

Myoxanthus punctatus is a species of orchid. It is an epiphyte native to Minas Gerais and Espírito Santo states of southeastern Brazil.
