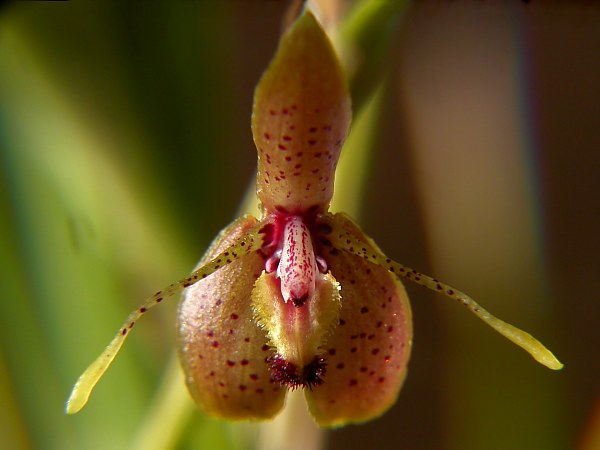

Scientific classification
- Kingdom: Plantae
- Clade: Tracheophytes
- Clade: Angiosperms
- Clade: Monocots
- Order: Asparagales
- Family: Orchidaceae
- Subfamily: Epidendroideae
- Tribe: Epidendreae
- Subtribe: Pleurothallidinae
- Genus: Myoxanthus
- Species: M. lonchophyllus

Binomial name
- Myoxanthus lonchophyllus (Barb.Rodr.) Luer

Synonyms
- Chaetocephala lonchophylla (Barb.Rodr.) Barb.Rodr.; Dubois-reymondia lonchophylla (Barb.Rodr.) Brieger; Humboldtia warmingii (Rchb.f.) Kuntze; Pleurothallis lonchophylla (Barb.Rodr.) Cogn.; Pleurothallis warmingii Rchb.f.; Restrepia lonchophylla Barb.Rodr. (basionym)

= Myoxanthus lonchophyllus =

Species of orchid

Myoxanthus lonchophyllus is a species of orchid endemic to southeastern Brazil. It is found in the Mantiqueira Mountains rain forest of Minas Gerais at elevations of 1000 to 1500 meters.
