= Myoxanthus cereus =

Scientific classification
- Kingdom: Plantae
- Clade: Embryophytes
- Clade: Tracheophytes
- Clade: Angiosperms
- Clade: Monocots
- Order: Asparagales
- Family: Orchidaceae
- Subfamily: Epidendroideae
- Tribe: Epidendreae
- Subtribe: Pleurothallidinae
- Genus: Myoxanthus
- Species: M. cereus

Binomial name
- Myoxanthus cereus (Ames) Luer ex Rojas-Alv. & Karremans

Synonyms
- Pleurothallis cerea Ames

Species of orchid

Myoxanthus cereus is a species of orchid. It is an epiphyte native to Costa Rica and Panama.
