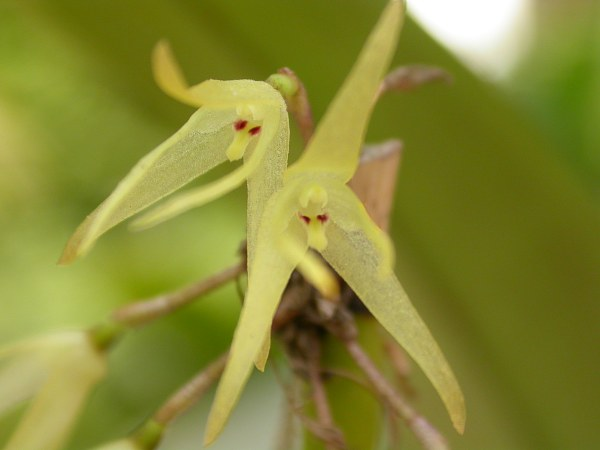

Scientific classification
- Kingdom: Plantae
- Clade: Tracheophytes
- Clade: Angiosperms
- Clade: Monocots
- Order: Asparagales
- Family: Orchidaceae
- Subfamily: Epidendroideae
- Genus: Myoxanthus
- Species: M. exasperatus

Binomial name
- Myoxanthus exasperatus (Lindl.) Luer

Synonyms
- Pleurothallis exasperata Lindl. (basionym); Pleurothallis peduncularis Lindl.; Anathallis parahybunensis Barb.Rodr.; Humboldtia exasperata (Lindl.) Kuntze; Humboldtia peduncularis Kuntze; Pleurothallis macropus Schltr.; Myoxanthus parahybunensis (Barb.Rodr.) Luer; Specklinia peduncularis (Kuntze) F.Barros

= Myoxanthus exasperatus =

Species of plant

Myoxanthus exasperatus is a species of orchid native to Central America and tropical South America.
