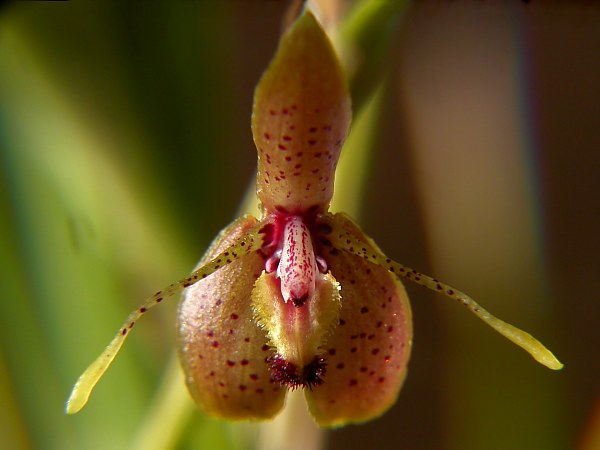
- Myoxanthus lonchophyllus

Scientific classification
- Kingdom: Plantae
- Clade: Tracheophytes
- Clade: Angiosperms
- Clade: Monocots
- Order: Asparagales
- Family: Orchidaceae
- Subfamily: Epidendroideae
- Tribe: Epidendreae
- Subtribe: Pleurothallidinae
- Genus: Myoxanthus; Poepp. & Endl.

Species
- 54; see text

Synonyms
- Chaetocephala Barb.Rodr.; Dubois-reymondia H.Karst.; Duboisia H.Karst.

= Myoxanthus =

Genus of orchids

Myoxanthus (from Greek for "dormouse" and "flower") is a genus of orchids with over 50 species, widely distributed in southern Mexico, Central America, and tropical South America. This genus is a close ally of Pleurothallis.

The genera Chaetocephala Barb.Rodr., Dubois-reymondia H.Karst., and Duboisia H.Karst. have been included in Myoxanthus.

== Species ==
54 species are accepted.

- Myoxanthus aciculifolius Luer
- Myoxanthus affinis (Lindl.) Luer
- Myoxanthus anancusiensis H.R.Quispe, R.D.Cuadros & F.H.Calderon
- Myoxanthus antennifer Luer & Hirtz
- Myoxanthus bolivianus Karremans, I.Jiménez & M.Zárate
- Myoxanthus ceratothallis (Rchb.f.) Luer
- Myoxanthus cereus (Ames) Luer ex Rojas-Alv. & Karremans
- Myoxanthus chloe (Luer & R.Vásquez) Luer
- Myoxanthus cimex (Luer & R.Escobar) Luer
- Myoxanthus claudiana Uribe Vélez, Sauleda & Szlach.
- Myoxanthus colothrix (Luer) Luer
- Myoxanthus conceicioensis M.Frey & N.Sanson
- Myoxanthus congestus (A.Rich. & Galeotti) Soto Arenas (synonym Myoxanthus octomeriae (Schltr.) Luer)
- Myoxanthus dasyllis Luer & Hirtz
- Myoxanthus ephelis (Luer) Luer
- Myoxanthus epibator Luer & R.Escobar
- Myoxanthus eumeces (Luer) Luer
- Myoxanthus exasperatus (Lindl.) Luer
- Myoxanthus fimbriatus Luer & Hirtz
- Myoxanthus frutex (Schltr.) Luer
- Myoxanthus georgei (Luer) Luer
- Myoxanthus gorgon Luer
- Myoxanthus gyas (Luer & R.Vásquez) Luer
- Myoxanthus herzogii (Schltr.) Luer
- Myoxanthus hirsuticaulis (Ames & C.Schweinf.) Luer
- Myoxanthus hystrix (Rchb.f.) Luer
- Myoxanthus lonchophyllus (Barb.Rodr.) Luer
- Myoxanthus mejiae (Garay & Dunst.) Luer
- Myoxanthus melittanthus (Schltr.) Luer
- Myoxanthus merae (Luer) Luer
- Myoxanthus monophyllus Poepp. & Endl.
- Myoxanthus montanus P.Ortiz
- Myoxanthus neillii Luer & Dodson
- Myoxanthus octomerioides (Lindl.) Luer
- Myoxanthus oliviae Kolan. & Szlach.
- Myoxanthus ortizianus Kolan. & Szlach.
- Myoxanthus panamensis Rojas-Alv. & Karremans
- Myoxanthus parahybunensis (Barb.Rodr.) Luer
- Myoxanthus parvilabius (C.Schweinf.) Luer
- Myoxanthus pennellius (Luer) Rojas-Alv. & Karremans
- Myoxanthus priapus Luer
- Myoxanthus pulvinatus (Barb.Rodr.) Luer
- Myoxanthus punctatus (Barb.Rodr.) Luer (synonym Myoxanthus seidelii (Pabst) Luer)
- Myoxanthus reymondii (H.Karst.) Luer
- Myoxanthus ruschii Fraga & L.Kollmann
- Myoxanthus sarcodactylae (Luer) Luer
- Myoxanthus scandens (Ames) Luer
- Myoxanthus serripetalus (Kraenzl.) Luer
- Myoxanthus simplicicaulis (C.Schweinf.) Luer
- Myoxanthus sotoanus Pupulin, Bogarín & Mel.Fernández
- Myoxanthus trachychlamys (Schltr.) Luer
- Myoxanthus uxorius (Luer) Luer
- Myoxanthus werneri Luer
- Myoxanthus xiphion Luer
