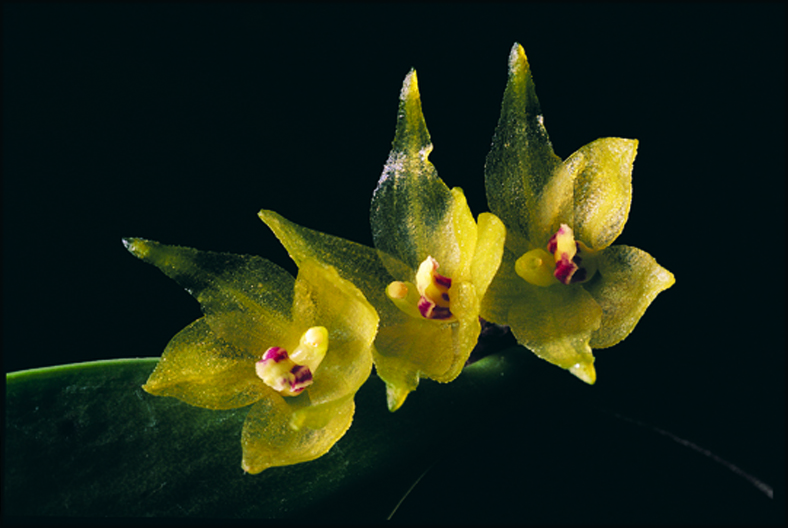

Scientific classification
- Kingdom: Plantae
- Clade: Tracheophytes
- Clade: Angiosperms
- Clade: Monocots
- Order: Asparagales
- Family: Orchidaceae
- Subfamily: Epidendroideae
- Genus: Myoxanthus
- Species: M. congestus

Binomial name
- Myoxanthus congestus (A.Rich. & Galeotti) Soto Arenas

Synonyms
- Humboltia elongata (Klotzsch) Kuntze; Myoxanthus octomeriae (Schltr.) Luer; Myoxanthus octomerioides var. octomeriae (Schltr.) O.Gruss & M.Wolff; Pleurothallis congesta A.Rich. & Galeotti (basionym); Pleurothallis elongata Klotzsch; Pleurothallis octomeriae Schltr.; Pleurothallis ramentacea Garay & Dunst.

= Myoxanthus congestus =

Species of orchid

Myoxanthus congestus is a species of orchid. It is an epiphyte native to southern Mexico (Chiapas), Central America, Colombia, and Venezuela.
