= Karl Matthäus Winter =

Karl Matthäus Winter (24 December 1932, in Worms – 19 September 2012, in Limburg an der Lahn) was a German artist and sculptor. He created numerous sacred works of art as well as four statues for the new figure cycle on the Cologne Council Tower.

== Life ==
After finishing school in 1947, Karl Matthäus Winter began his artistic career through an apprenticeship with his father, the sculptor and ceramicist Adam Winter. The apprenticeship was followed in 1951 by a three-year course at the Landeskunstschule Mainz, with Emy Roeder among others. In 1954, he moved to the Düsseldorf Art Academy and became a student of Ewald Mataré. He was good friends with the Mataré student Elmar Hillebrand and worked on various assignments with him, including the memorial for the former synagogue on the Lappenberg in Hildesheim. Since 1957 he lived and worked in Limburg an der Lahn.

Important works by Winter can also be found in the pilgrimage church of St. Katharina (Buschhoven) For which he himself gave some explanations: The work for St. Katharina began in 1968 with a dove of peace made from basalt lava on the outside of the foundation stone. In 1970, Karl Winter created the altar as a block of Estremos marble with apparently ornamental motifs based on emerging vegetative forms in a symbolic arrangement of numbers - three (trinity, divine), four (relating to the "whole" globe) and seven (perfection, completeness) . The "foliage grows together to form a tabletop to serve as a sacrificial altar". The sacrament stele from 1970 has the same ornamentation as the altar, but the vegetative forms are united in a common "crown", with the number three playing an important role here, based on the hexagonal plan (2 by 3). "With the ambo from 1972 there are many leaves, perhaps because the kingdom of God grows out of the little mustard seed of the Annunciation like a stately bush! "The simple bronze door of the tabernacle was changed ten years later at the request of the pastor, and the Eucharistic symbols - ears of corn and vines - worked in ivory have been added even if it was against his concept. The "housing" for the figure of Mary or the Stele made of the Italian stone "Pepperino rosso" with inlaid flowers from "Estramos", created in 1975, shows the rose bush ornamentation and thus takes the theme of "in addition, the Eucharistic symbols - ears of corn and vines - worked in ivory were added, even if it was against his concept. The "housing" for the figure of Mary or the Stele made of the Italian stone "Pepperino rosso" with inlaid flowers from "Estramos", created in 1975, shows the rose bush ornamentation and thus takes the theme of "in addition, the Eucharistic symbols - ears of corn and vines - worked in ivory were added, even if it was against his concept. The "housing" for the figure of Mary or the Stele made of the Italian stone "Pepperino rosso" with inlaid flowers from "Estramos", created in 1975, shows the rose bush ornamentation and thus takes the theme of "Rosa mystica ". In 1971, the sculptor Winter created the baptismal font in Estramos marble, which "is about the source of living water and shows that it overflows in abundance".

His main works include the four figures for the council tower of Cologne city hall. Shortly before his death, he created the altar, ambo and tabernacle for the new diocesan center St. Nikolaus in Limburg an der Lahn on behalf of Franz-Peter Tebartz van-Elst.

Karl Matthäus Winter married the goldsmith Marie Louise Perabo in 1957.

== Works (selection) ==
- 1955: St. John the Baptist, Alt- Erkrath, candlesticks
- 1960: St. Johann Baptist, Cologne-Roggendorf, tabernacle
- 1961: St. Maternus, Cologne-Rodenkirchen, tabernacle
- 1962: St. Andreas, bronze portal, Cologne
- 1964: St. Ursula, working on the choir, Cologne
- 1965–1978: St. Lambertus, Düsseldorf, Kreuzweg and baptismal font
- 1967: Limburg Cathedral, cover from the baptismal font, bronze
- 1970: St. Katharina, Buschhoven, altar
- 1970–1980: St. Katharina, Buschhoven, sacrament stele
- 1971–1972: St. Katharina, Buschhoven, baptismal font, ambo
- 1972: Niederdonk Chapel of Grace, tabernacle
- 1975: St. Katharina, Buschhoven, Marienstele
- 1976: Fountain Adolfsallee, Wiesbaden, bronze with granite
- 1979: four figures of saints, Sankt Raphael, Wuppertal
- 1983: Catholic Church of Christ Resurrection, Bonn-Röttgen, bronze crown above the altar and Stations of the Cross with Elmar Hillebrand
- 1984–1989: Groß St. Martin, Cologne - bronze lid from the baptismal font, tabernacle
- 1985: Werner-Senger-Brunnen, Limburg an der Lahn
- 1887: St. Peter and Paul, Ratingen, baptismal font cover
- 1988: Participation in the synagogue monument, Hildesheim
- 1989–1990: Council tower at Cologne City Hall - figure Hermann Josef Stübben
- 1991–1992: Council tower at Cologne City Hall - figure Gottfried Hagen
- 1992: Celebration altar and ambo in the crossing of the [4] Herz-Jesu-Kirche (Ettlingen) .
- 1994: Council tower at Cologne City Hall - Figure Innocenz III.
- 1994: Council tower at Cologne City Hall - figure Friedrich II.
- 1995: St. Jakobus, Frankfurt-Harheim, altar
- 1998: St. Quintin, Mainz, altar, ambo, Sedilien
- 2000: St. Maria and Clemens, Schwarzrheindorf, Pietà
- 2003: Children's grave, main cemetery, Limburg an der Lahn
- 2011: Diocesan Center St. Nikolaus, Limburg an der Lahn, altar, ambo and tabernacle
- St. Anna, Limburg an der Lahn - altar, ambo, candlestick and standing cross
- Knight Hattstein-Brunnen, Limburg an der Lahn
- Old Lahn Bridge, Limburg an der Lahn, Nepomuk bridge figure
- Marble bridge, Villmar, bridge figure Nepomuk
- St. Maria and Clemens Schwarzrheindorf, altar
- St. Mauritius, Büderich - Joseph sculpture
- St. Georg, Mainz-Kastel, cross and celebration altar
- St. Ludgerus, Holy House, altar room and cross stele
- Siegburg Abbey Church, figure of St. Benedict
- St. Sebastian, Bornheim-Roisdorf, baptismal font

== Exhibitions ==
- 2013: Kunstraum 27, Cologne, with catalog
- 2006: Taken from the pedestal - Cologne City Museum exhibits council tower figures (participation)
- 2018: There is no talk of art, the artist couple Marie Louise Winter and Karl Matthäus Winter - Diözesanmuseum Limburg, 2018.

== Literature ==
- Vera Bachmann: artist biographies . In: Hiltrud Kier, Bernd Ernsting, Ulrich Krings (Hrsg.): Cologne: The Council Tower. His story and his program of characters . JP Bachem Verlag, (Stadtspuren - Denkmäler in Köln, Volume 21), Cologne 1996, ISBN 3-7616-1156-0, p. 670.
- Old and new art in the Archdiocese of Paderborn, Volume 39, 1999, ISBN 3-00-005204-6, p.
- Peter Claus: Sculptors and their work in the Rheingau - Part 4 - Karl Matthäus Winter, Limburg, b. 1932 . In: Rheingau Forum Heft 1, 2007, pp. 23–26.
- Clemens Hillebrand : Karl Matthäus Winter, sculptures and reliefs - catalog for the exhibition of the same name in the Galerie Kunsttraum 27, Cologne, 2013.
- Dorothee Haentjes-Holländer : The pilgrimage church of St. Adelheid am Pützchen, discovery of an art space. (= Monument and History Association Bonn-Rechtsrheinisch eV [Hrsg.]: Small contributions to monument and history in Bonn on the right bank of the Rhine . Volume 2 ). Bonn 2015, ISBN 978-3-9812164-4-8 (48 pages).
- Theodor Kloft, Dominik Müller, Melanie Scheidler: Art is not talked about - the artist couple Marie Louise Winter and Karl Matthäus Winter, catalog for the exhibition of the Diocesan Museum Limburg, Diocese of Limburg, 2018.
