= Myoxanthus fimbriatus =

Scientific classification
- Kingdom: Plantae
- Clade: Tracheophytes
- Clade: Angiosperms
- Clade: Monocots
- Order: Asparagales
- Family: Orchidaceae
- Subfamily: Epidendroideae
- Genus: Myoxanthus
- Species: M. fimbriatus

Binomial name
- Myoxanthus fimbriatus Luer & Hirtz

Species of plant

Myoxanthus fimbriatus is a species of orchid that occurs from southeastern Ecuador to northern Peru.
