= Myoxanthus octomerioides =

Scientific classification
- Kingdom: Plantae
- Clade: Tracheophytes
- Clade: Angiosperms
- Clade: Monocots
- Order: Asparagales
- Family: Orchidaceae
- Subfamily: Epidendroideae
- Tribe: Epidendreae
- Subtribe: Pleurothallidinae
- Genus: Myoxanthus
- Species: M. octomerioides

Binomial name
- Myoxanthus octomerioides (Lindl.) Luer

Synonyms
- Humboltia octomerioides (Lindl.) Kuntze; Pleurothallis octomerioides Lindl.

Species of orchid

Myoxanthus octomerioides is a species of orchid. It is an epiphyte native to the southern Mexican states of Guerrero, Oaxaca, and Veracruz.
