= Elmar Hillebrand =

German sculptor (1925–2016)

Elmar Hillebrand (11 October 1925, Cologne – 8 January 2016, Cologne) was a German sculptor.

== Life and education ==
After graduating from high school at Apostelgymnasium (1943) and then doing military service and being a prisoner of war, Elmar Hillebrand studied from 1946 to 1950 at the Düsseldorf Art Academy with Joseph Enseling and as a master student with Ewald Mataré, Joseph Beuys, among others. After studying at the Académie de la Grande Chaumière in Paris with Ossip Zadkine as well as stays abroad and trips (including to Algeria), he exhibited his own work for the first time in 1952.

After working at the Dombauhütte in Cologne, he was appointed associate professor for sculpture at the Faculty of Architecture at RWTH Aachen University in 1964 (full professor from 1967, emeritus since 1988). In 1968 he was one of the signatories of the "Marburg Manifesto", along with numerous other professors from RWTH Aachen University, which formed an academic front against the emerging co-determination at universities.

Hillebrand created a large number of works that were visibly displayed in public spaces, including the statue in the lobby of the UN City of Vienna as well as statues in churches and in various public places in Europe. The main altar of Cologne Cathedral is considered to be Hillebrand's main work. His involvement in the reconstruction of the Romanesque church buildings in Cologne, where he worked closely with architects such as Hans Schilling and Gottfried Böhm, was also formative for his work. What was important for Hillebrand was the collegial cooperation with artist colleagues from the Cologne School such as Theo Heiermann, Jochem Pechau, Hans Karl Burgeff, Karl Matthäus Winter, Klaus Balke and others.

Hillebrand lived and worked in Cologne-Weiß. His son Johannes Hillebrand is also a sculptor, his son Clemens Hillebrand a painter.

In May 2011, he handed over his estate from 1952 to 2009 to the historical archive of the Archdiocese of Cologne.

== Honors and awards ==
- Great Art Prize of the City of Cologne (1961)
- Great Silver Medal of the City of Rome (1961)

== Works ==
- Main altar in Cologne Cathedral
- Main altar, ambo, choir stalls, choir screens, mosaic carpet, archbishop's cathedra, Marian column, framing architectural paintings in the chapel of St. Korbinian in the Frauenkirche (Munich)
- Main altar in the Osnabrück Cathedral
- Main altar in Eichstätt Cathedral
- Altar island, high altar and ambo in Trier Cathedral [10]
- Figure cycle "Adam" in the Trier Liebfrauenbasilika [10]
- Way of the Cross made of bronze, northern door made of oak wood and stone cover of the Kunibertspütz in St. Kunibert in Cologne
- Sacrament chapel, sacrament altar, stone carpet, iron grating, pews, weather vane in the Neu St. Alban church in Cologne (city garden) - Architect: Hans Schilling
- Weather vane on Klein St. Martin with image of the saint, Cologne
- Weather vane on Groß St. Martin and sculpture made of Weiberner tuff in the gable of the sacristy
- Weather vane on St. Andreas, Cologne [11]
- Statue of Joseph Cardinal Frings on the Cologne Council Tower
- Statue of St. Severin at the Severinsbrücke in Cologne
- two statues (The Good Shepherd and Jacob's Fight with the Angel) made of Wirbelau marble in front of the Church of St. Bruno in Cologne
- Bronze statue of Cardinal Joseph Frings in front of the St. Quirinus Minster, Neuss
- City fountain in Neuss
- Fountain in the courtyard of the Cologne Regional Council
- Fountain in front of the State Statistical Office in Düsseldorf
- Fountain column in the courtyard of the Technical University of Aachen
- Fountain on the church square in front of St. Peter in Heimstetten near Munich
- Fountain monument as a memorial for the former synagogue on the Lappenberg in Hildesheim, 1979.
- Cross in the Church of St. Peter in Heimstetten near Munich (architect: Alexander von Branca)
- Statue of St. Francis in the lobby of the UN City, Vienna
- Altar frieze in Essen Minster
- Main altar in the church and altar in the north side apse of St. Pantaleon (Cologne)
- Main altar in the Romanesque church of St. Maria in Lyskirchen in Cologne - architect during the renovation: Karl Band
- Interior of St. Ursula (Kalscheuren) - Architect: Gottfried Böhm
- Interior of St. Adelheid (Niederhövels) - Architect: Wilhelm Schlombs
- Interior of St. Maria Hilf (Heide) - Architect: Fritz Schaller
- Equipment and weather vanes from St. Mauritius (Cologne) - Architect: Fritz Schaller
- Triumphal cross and ambo in Mönchengladbach Minster
- Altar, pulpit and communion benches in Sankt Raphael, Wuppertal- Langerfeld
- Altar island and portal relief of the St. Erentraud Abbey, Kellenried, Berg (Schussental)
- Statue of Cardinal Clemens August Graf von Galen in Haltern am See
- Portal of the Church of the Multiplication in Tabgha, Israel
- Portal in the Campo Santo Teutonico in Rome
- Portal in the castle church St. Maria von den Engeln in Brühl
- Relief depicting the Archangel Michael on the northern outer wall of St. Peter's Church in Zülpich
- Altars, stations of the cross and choir grilles in St. Blasien Cathedral, southern Black Forest
- Stations of the Cross in St. Johann Baptist zu Erkrath
- Overall design and south side of the memorial for the synagogue on Lappenberg, Hildesheim [12]
- Intarsia carpet for the floor design in the Paul Ehrlich Institute, Langen
- Floor design in the Romanesque church of St. Gereon, Cologne
- Artistic design of the crypt with the grave of Blessed Ulrika of Hegne in the church St. Konrad of the convent Hegne, Allensbach [13]
- Five bronze arches (1981), ornamental fountain with plant and animal motifs. Location: State Office for Information and Technology, Bankstrasse and Mauerstrasse, Düsseldorf
- Altar hanging cross, Franziskustafel with side panels by Clemens Hillebrand, Canticle of the Sun by Francis of Assisi, Resurrection panel, Pietà and baptismal font in the Catholic. Parish Church of St. Heinrich in Esch-sur-Alzette, Luxembourg [14]
- colored stone engravings around the portals of the city church Triberg
- Wall, pillar and ceiling paintings with Theo Heiermann, in St. Otger, Stadtlohn, architect during the renovation, 1983/1984, Nikolaus Rosiny
- Celebration altar in the pilgrimage church Maria in der Tanne, Triberg
- Celebration altar in the parish church of St. Sebastian in Triberg-Nußbach
- Celebration altar in the parish church of St. Joseph in Triberg-Gremmelsbach
- Celebration altar in St. Sebastian in pledges, ambo and stucco relief behind an altarpiece of Mary. The paintings in the choir arch and in the window reveals as well as the new edging of the altarpiece were designed and executed by Clemens Hillebrand
- Way of the Cross in the Saarbrücken Church of Maria Königin [10]
- Way of the Cross with Karl Winter and weather vane on the spire, Christ's Resurrection in Bonn Röttgen
- High altar in the parish church of St. Stephanus in Polch [10]
- High altar made of Savonnières limestone with Theo Heiermann in the Liebfrauenkirche in Koblenz (Clemens Hillebrand painted the fasting image with the Arma Christi on the back of the reredos)
- Chancel in the parish church of the Visitation of the Virgin Mary in Wadgassen [10]
- Altar retable and portal in the pilgrimage church of St. Adelheid am Pützchen [15]
- Parousia relief in the Pax Christi Church in Essen
- Wall painting with Theo Heiermann in the Church of St. Monika in Überherrn in Saarland, 1979–1981
