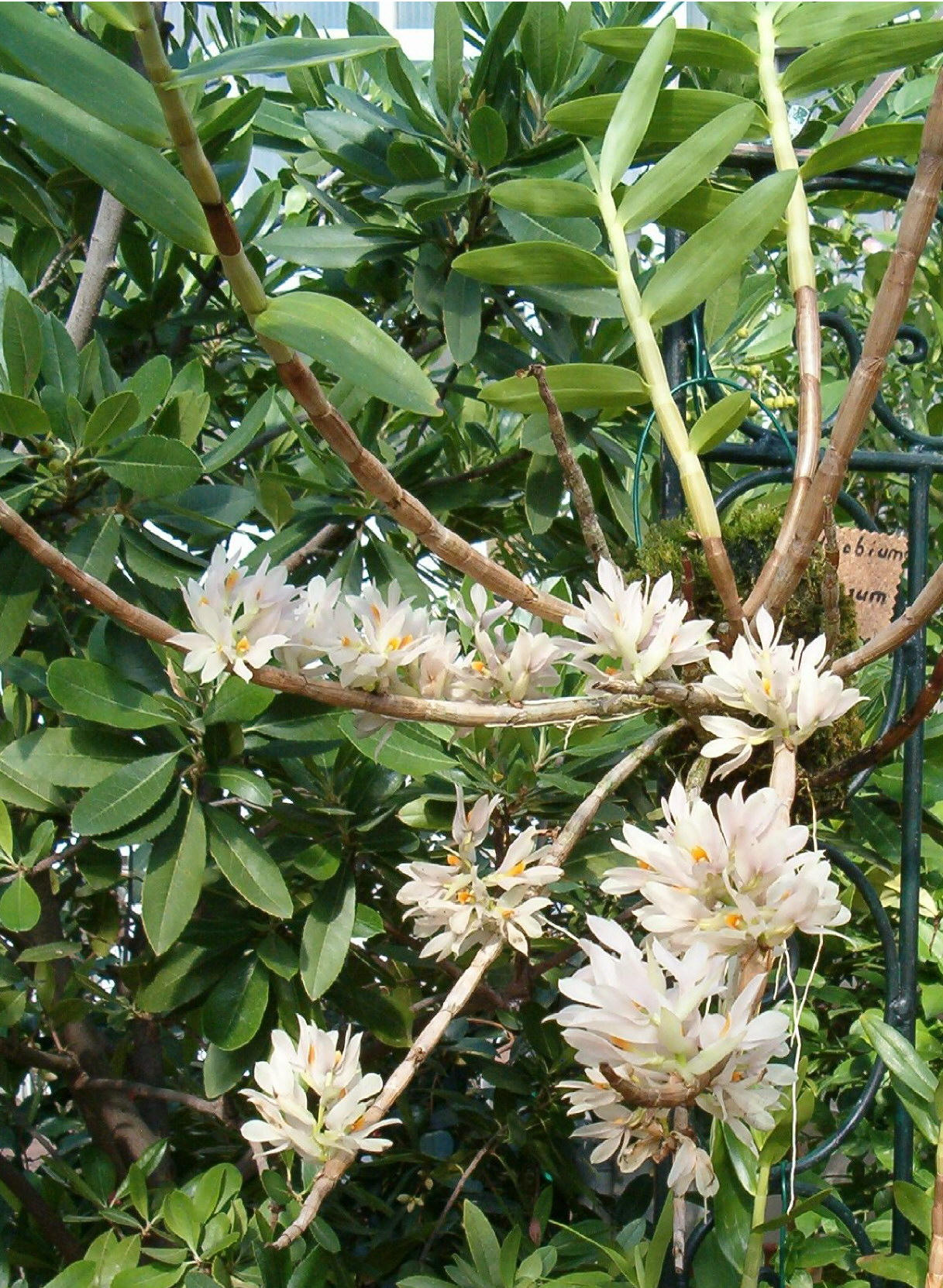

Scientific classification
- Kingdom: Plantae
- Clade: Tracheophytes
- Clade: Angiosperms
- Clade: Monocots
- Order: Asparagales
- Family: Orchidaceae
- Subfamily: Epidendroideae
- Genus: Dendrobium
- Species: D. bracteosum

Binomial name
- Dendrobium bracteosum Rchb.f. (1886)

Synonyms
- Dendrobium chrysolabrum Rolfe (1889); Dendrobium novae-hiberniae Kraenzl. (1894); Dendrobium dixsonii F.M. Bailey (1899); Dendrobium dixsonii var. eborinum F.M. Bailey (1899); Dendrobium bracteosum var. album Sander (1901); Dendrobium bracteosum var. roseum Sander (1901); Dendrobium trisaccatum Kraenzl. (1910); Dendrobium eitapense Schltr. (1912); Dendrobium quadrialatum J.J.Sm. (1922); Dendrobium leucochysum Schltr. (1923); Pedilonum bracteosum (Rchb.f.) Rauschert (1983); Pedilonum eitapense (Schltr.) Rauschert (1983); Pedilonum leucochysum (Schltr.) Rauschert (1983); Pedilonum quadrialatum (J.J.Sm.) Rauschert (1983)

= Dendrobium bracteosum =

Bracted dendrobium

Species of orchid

Dendrobium bracteosum (bracted dendrobium) is a species of orchid. It is native to New Guinea, the Bismarck Archipelago and the Indonesian Province of Maluku.
