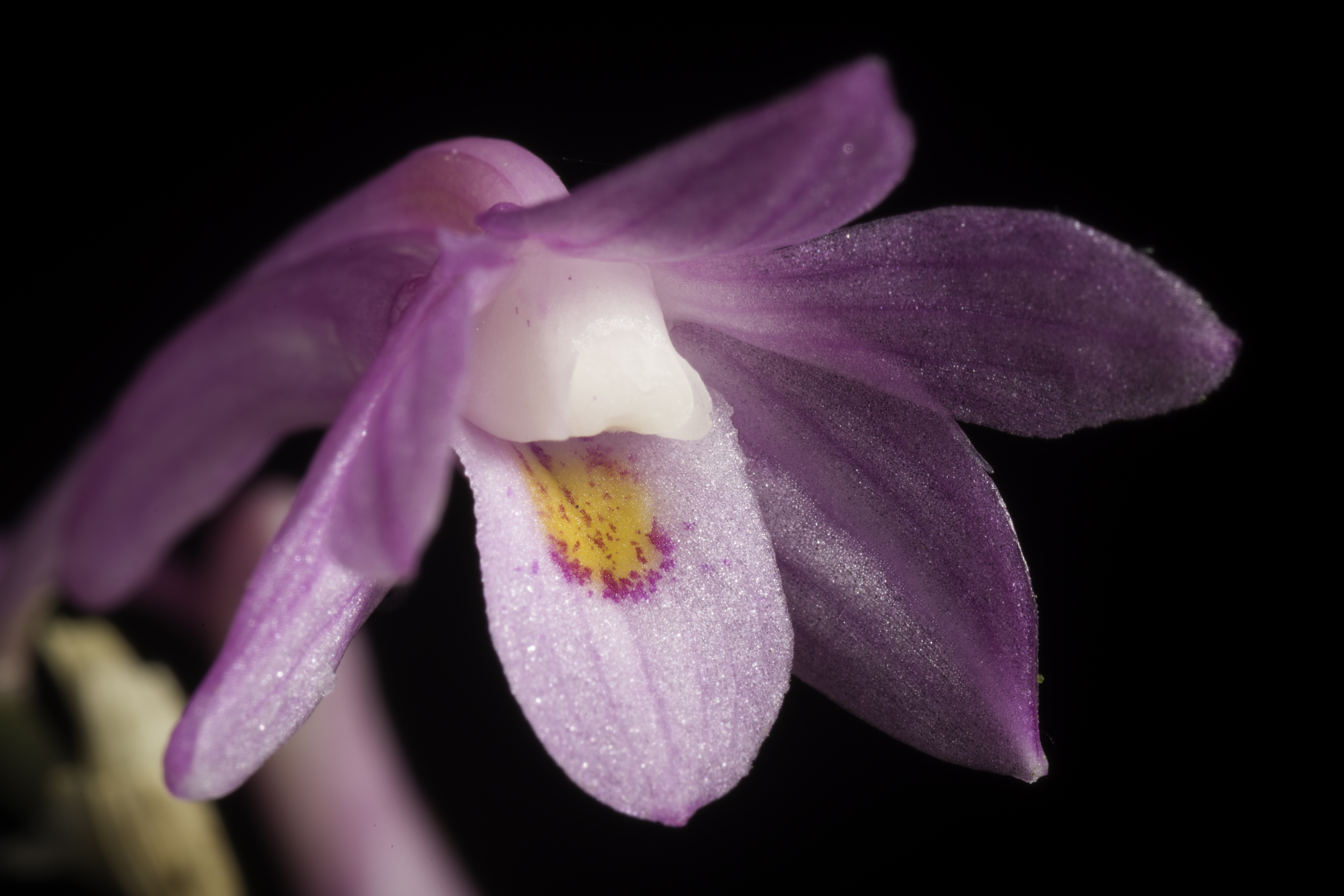
- 1847 illustration

Scientific classification
- Kingdom: Plantae
- Clade: Tracheophytes
- Clade: Angiosperms
- Clade: Monocots
- Order: Asparagales
- Family: Orchidaceae
- Subfamily: Epidendroideae
- Genus: Dendrobium
- Species: D. hasseltii

Binomial name
- Dendrobium hasseltii (Blume) Lindl.

Synonyms
- Pedilonum hasseltii Blume (basionym); Pedilonum kuhlii Blume; Dendrobium kuhlii (Blume) Lindl.; Dendrobium curtisii Rchb.f.; Dendrobium cornutum Hook.f.; Callista cornuta (Hook.f.) Kuntze; Callista hasseltii (Blume) Kuntze; Callista kuhlii (Blume) Kuntze; Dendrobium brinchangense Holttum; Pedilonum brinchangense (Holttum) Rauschert; Pedilonum cornutum (Hook.f.) Rauschert

= Dendrobium hasseltii =

Species of orchid

Dendrobium hasseltii, commonly known as the Hasselt's dendrobium or spinach orchid, is a species of orchid. It is native to Borneo, Java, Sumatra, and Peninsular Malaysia.
