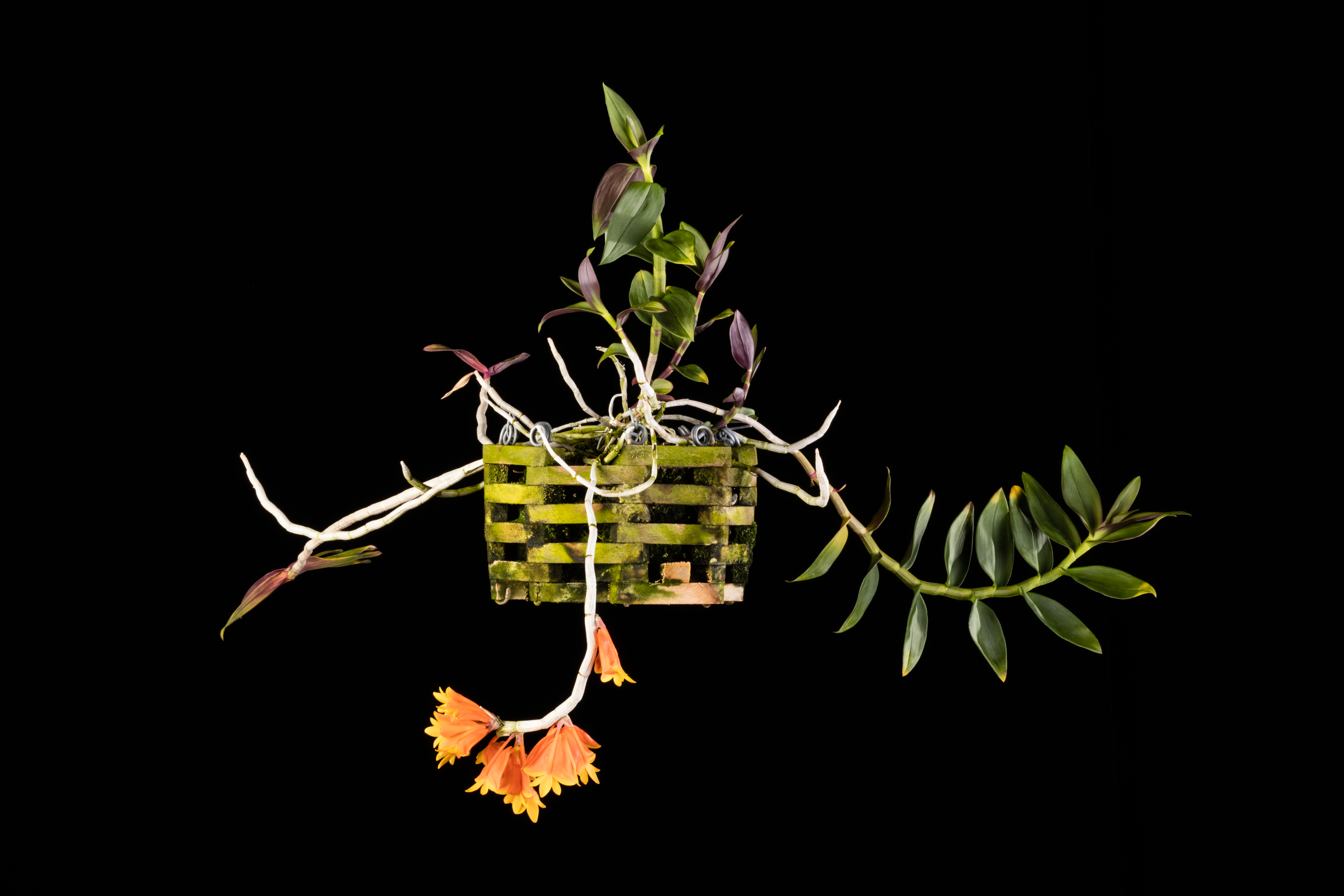

Scientific classification
- Kingdom: Plantae
- Clade: Tracheophytes
- Clade: Angiosperms
- Clade: Monocots
- Order: Asparagales
- Family: Orchidaceae
- Subfamily: Epidendroideae
- Genus: Dendrobium
- Species: D. chrysopterum

Binomial name
- Dendrobium chrysopterum Schuit. & de Vogel

Synonyms
- Chromatotriccum chrysopterum D.L.Jones & M.A.Clem.

= Dendrobium chrysopterum =

Species of orchid

Dendrobium chrysopterum is a species of orchid native to Papua New Guinea. It grows in submontane habitats from 600-800m in elevation as an epiphyte.

== Description ==
The flowers are borne on long canes up to 60 cm long, and are present throughout the year. The sepals and petals are bright yellow to orange. The bright coloration and scentless flowers point to birds being the primary pollinators.

== In Cultivation ==
It is common in cultivation and can be grown under mild conditions in partial shade. Because its native habitat experiences high rainfall year-round, when grown in captivity it should be well-watered.
