= Hans Edmund Nicola Burgeff =

German botanist (1883–1976)

- Born: 19 April 1883
- Died: 27 September 1976 (aged 93)
- Children: Hans Karl Burgeff (son)
- Scientific career
- Fields: Botany

Hans Edmund Nicola Burgeff (19 April 1883 – 27 September 1976) was a German botanist. He was father of the sculptor and medal engraver Hans Karl Burgeff.
