= Hans Karl Burgeff =

German sculptor

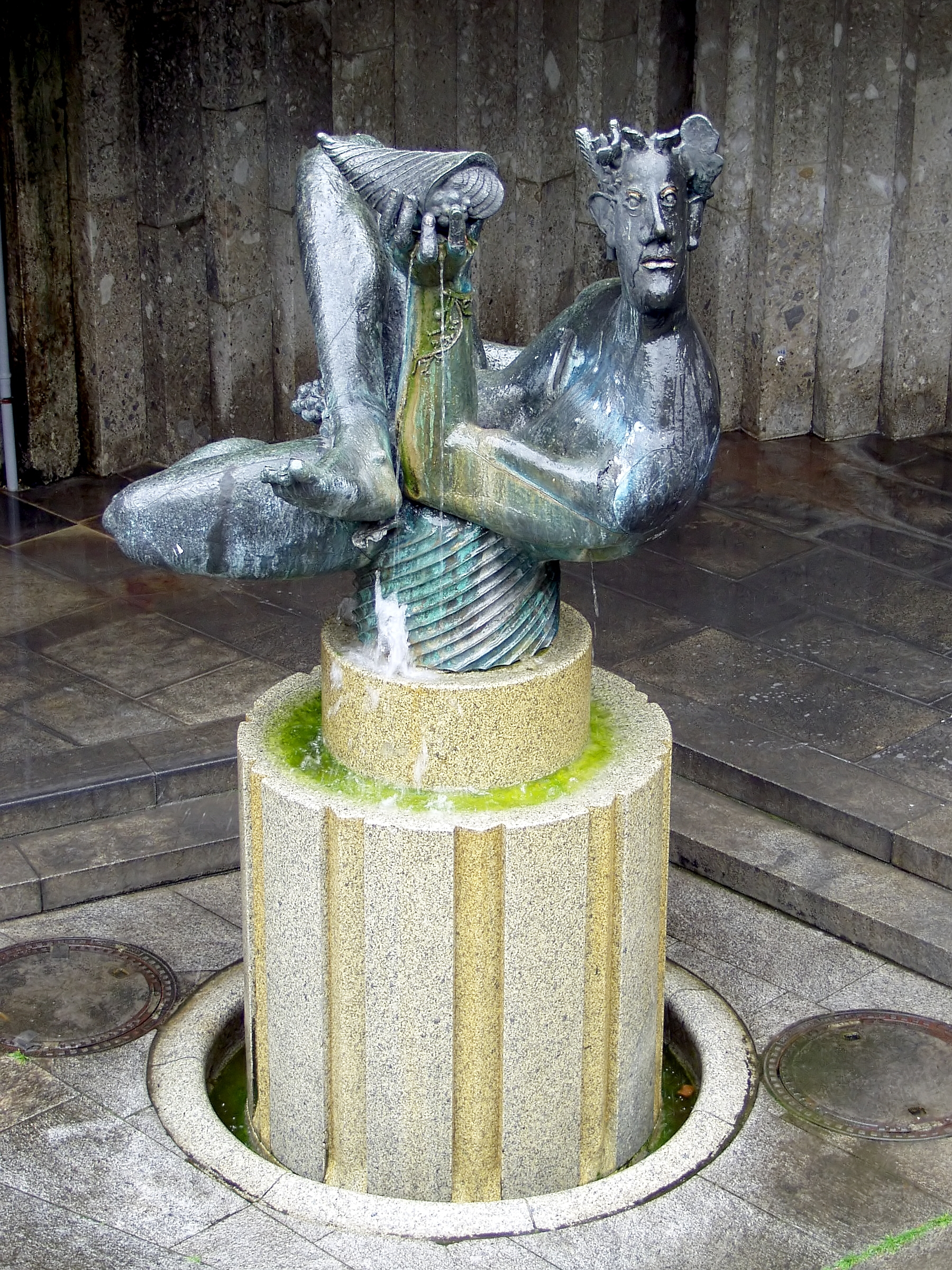
Dionysos Fountain, Cologne Cathedral

Hans Karl Burgeff (20 April 1928 – 25 November 2005) was a German sculptor, medal engraver and art lecturer, who worked mostly in the Rhineland.

== Life ==
Burgeff was born in Würzburg, the son of Hans Burgeff, university professor of botany. He first studied "General Science" (German: Allgemeine Naturwissenschaften) at the University of Würzburg, but afterwards studied the history of art in Stuttgart and in Tübingen. In 1951 he transferred to the Kölner Werkschulen, where he studied sculpture and modelling with Prof. Ludwig Gies and was nominated "master student" (Meisterschüler) in 1956.

Independent from 1957, Burgeff quickly became known for his predominantly religious works, such as church portals, altar tables, crucifixes and statues of saints. In 1968 he received the Sculptor's Advancement Prize of the city of Cologne and the nomination to the professorship of sculpture and bronze modelling at the Kölner Werkschulen (as successor to Kurt Schwippert), a post he held until 1988.

For the "public effectiveness" (German: öffentliche Wirksamkeit) of Burgeff's figures, reliefs and plaques, the memorial tablet in Münster for Cardinal Höffner of 1993 is especially representative. Other works of the artist are to be found, among other places, in the sculpture park of Schloss Moyland and at Cologne Cathedral.

Among the many distinctions and honours awarded to Burgeff was honorary membership of the Deutsche Gesellschaft für Medaillenkunst ("German Society for Medal Art"), conferred upon him in 2001.

Burgeff died in Lohmar and was buried in Weibern in the Eifel. His gravestone, representing two wheatsheaves, was made by his last master student, Ulrich Görtz.

His estate, insofar as it related to medal making, was given to the coin and medal collection of the Berlin State Museums.
