= Friedrich Gustav Brieger =

German-Brazilian geneticist

Friedrich Gustav Brieger (October 11, 1900 – February 6, 1985) was a German-born Brazilian botanist, geneticist, and professor who researched heterosis in maize and developed methods to produce improved synthetic varieties. Described as one of the founders of the field of genetics in Brazil, he taught at the Department of Genetics of the Luiz de Queiroz College of Agriculture.

== Biography ==
=== Early life and education ===
Born in Wrocław, he was the son of the medical doctor and professor Oskar Brieger and Annelies Kaiser Brieger. He showed an interest in botany from an early age, collecting plants with his father, who taught him their scientific names. As a student, he receive a travel prize to the Alps. In 1918, he enrolled at the University of Wrocław, where he studied natural history and from which he graduated in 1921. The same year, he completed a doctorate in botany at his alma mater. He then attended the universities of Munich, where he studied microorganisms under Hans Burgeff; the Humboldt University of Berlin, where he studied geobotany under Adolf Engler and worked with vegetal anatomy under Gottlieb Haberlandt; and the University of Jena, where he assisted Otto Renner at the Institute of Botany.

=== Career ===
In 1924, he was granted a scholarship by the Rockefeller Foundation to join Harvard University, where he worked under the orientation of Edward Murray East. There, he conducted research on the genetic properties of tobacco and maize. After returning to Germany, he began working at Kaiser-Wilhelm-Institut für Biologie, within the department led by Carl Correns, and later taught at the Humboldt University of Berlin. In 1933, with Adolf Hitler's rise to power, he was removed from his position as professor due to his Jewish ancestry and ouvert opposition to Nazism. After a period as a researcher at John Innes Horticultural Institution and as a lecturer at the University College London, he accepted an invitation to help establish a department of genetics at the Luiz de Queiroz College of Agriculture, a unit of the newly established University of São Paulo, which at the time recruited foreign academics to consolidate its faculty.

In 1936, he assumed the chair of cytology and genetics at ESALQ-USP, whose director, José Melo de Morais, shared Brieger's project of transforming the college into a research institution. Brieger then commissioned the construction of several experimental fields, besides introducing new research methods. As a professor, he insisted on the scientific importance of statistics, publishing the 1937 book Tábuas e Fórmulas para Estatística. Among his students was Warwick Estevam Kerr, who later became his assistant. In the late 1930s and early 1940s, as Brazil faced difficulties importing seeds, Brieger developed climate-adapted cultivar populations of tomato, cauliflower, lettuce, and spinach.

In 1955, Brieger became a founding member of the Brazilian Society of Genetics. In the late 1950s, he was invited to help coordinate the creation of the Institute of Biology at the University of Brasília. In 1968, at the invitation of Zeferino Vaz, he joined the State University of Campinas, where he served as vice-rector. He was a member of the Brazilian Academy of Sciences.

== Personal life ==
Brieger died on February 6, 1985, at the age of 84, in Bad Dürrheim.
