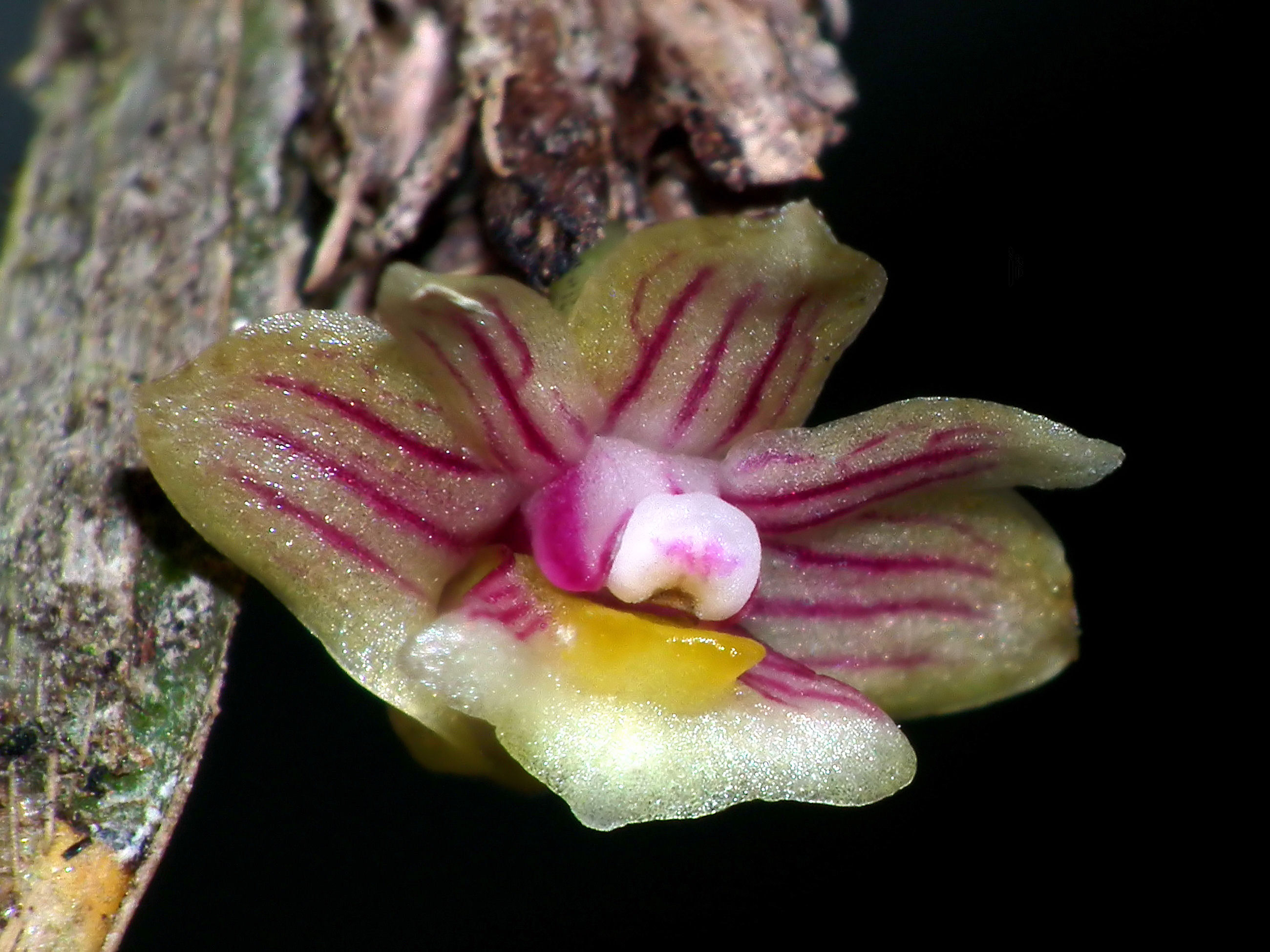

Scientific classification
- Kingdom: Plantae
- Clade: Tracheophytes
- Clade: Angiosperms
- Clade: Monocots
- Order: Asparagales
- Family: Orchidaceae
- Subfamily: Epidendroideae
- Genus: Dendrobium
- Species: D. distichum

Binomial name
- Dendrobium distichum (C.Presl) Rchb.f.

Synonyms
- Aporum distichum (C.Presl) Rauschert; Callista disticha (C.Presl) Kuntze; Schismoceras disticha C.Presl

= Dendrobium distichum =

Species of orchid

Dendrobium distichum is a species of plant in the family Orchidaceae endemic to the Philippines.
